= Croatian cuisine =

Culinary traditions of Croatia

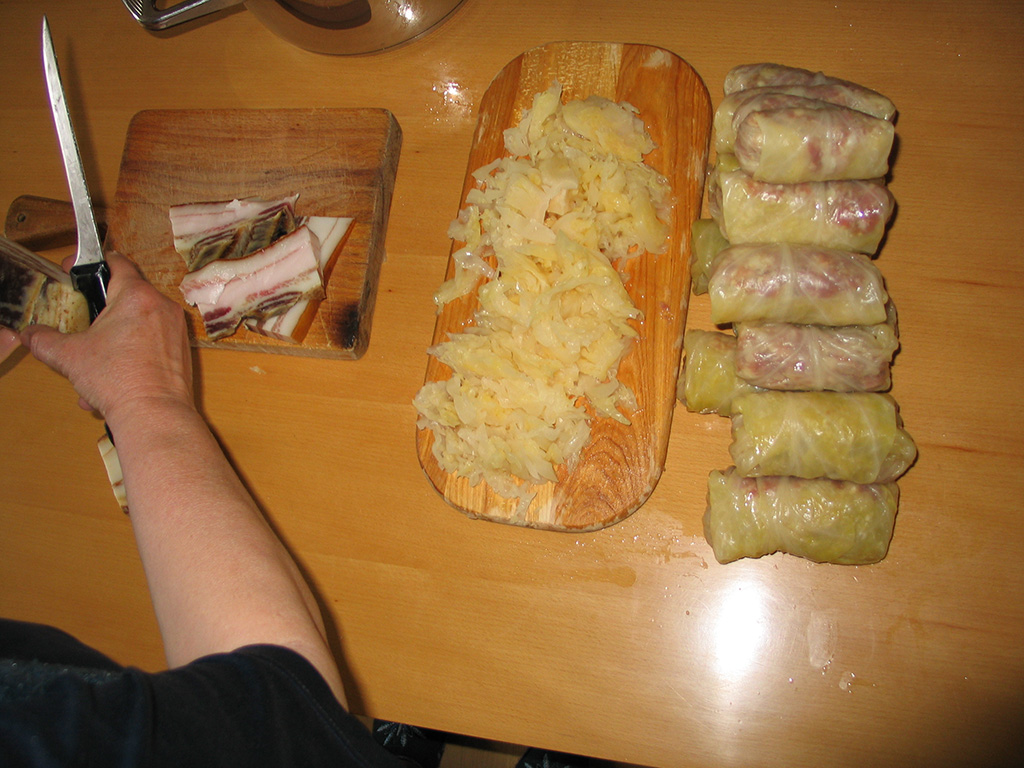
Preparation of Sinjski Arambaši

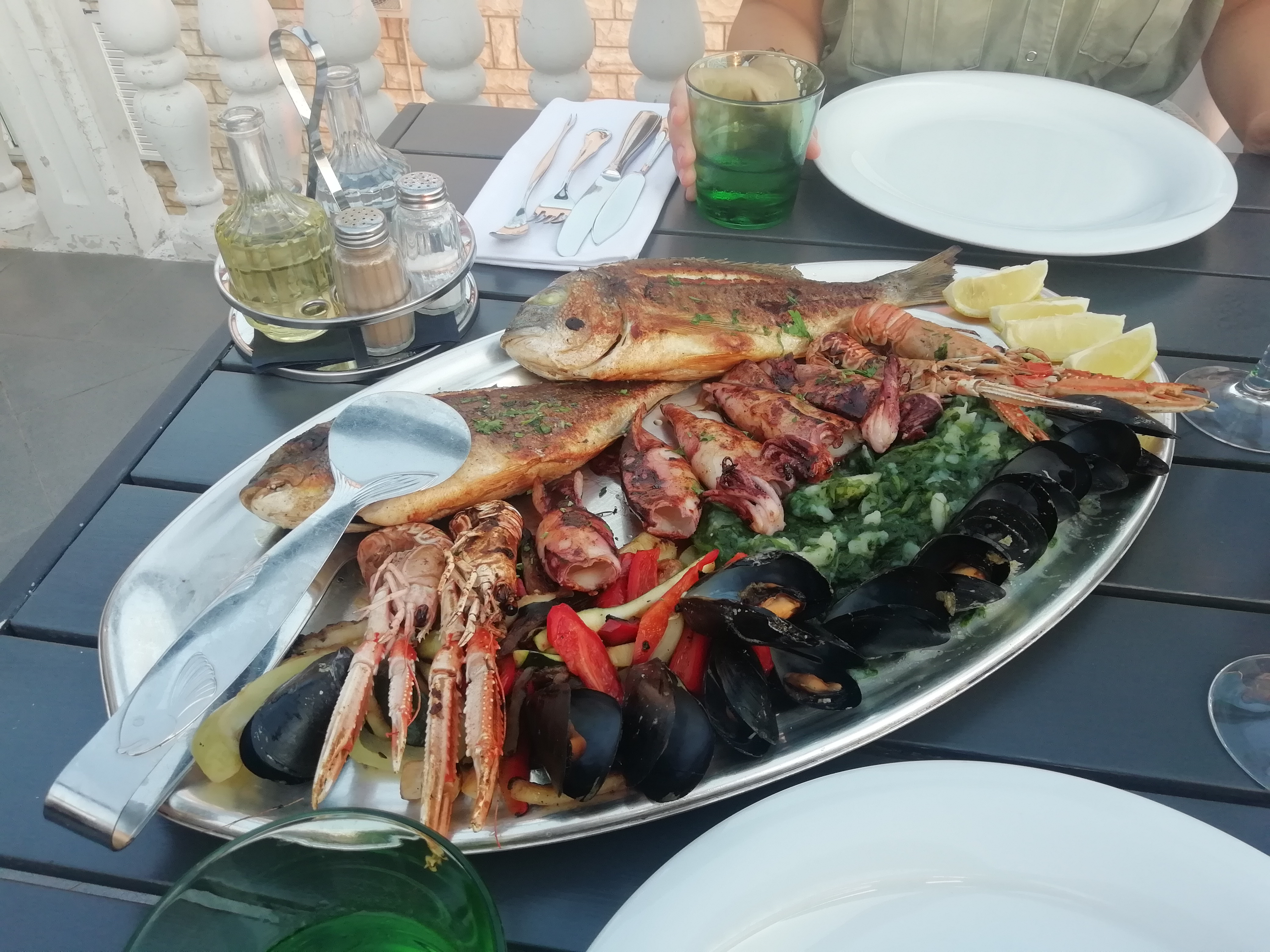
Sea food plate with Gilt-head bream, scampi, Mediterranean mussel, squid and vegetables

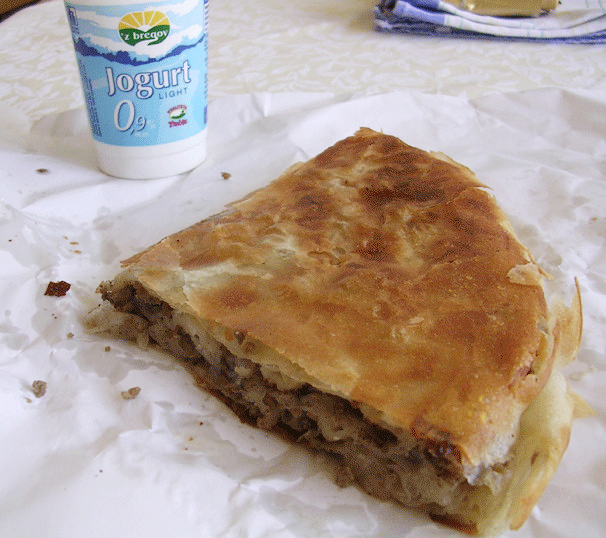
Croatian burek,served with yogurt

Croatian cuisine (Croatian: Hrvatska kuhinja) is heterogeneous and is known as a cuisine of the regions, since every region of Croatia has its own distinct culinary tradition. Its roots date back to ancient times. The differences in the selection of foodstuffs and forms of cooking are most notable between those in mainland and those in coastal regions. Mainland cuisine is more characterized by Slavic features and influences from the more recent contacts with Turkish, Hungarian and Austrian cuisine, using lard for cooking, and spices such as black pepper, paprika, and garlic. The coastal region bears the influences of Greek and Roman cuisine, as well as of the later Mediterranean cuisine, in particular Italian (especially Venetian). Coastal cuisines use olive oil, herbs and spices such as rosemary, sage, bay leaf, oregano, marjoram, cinnamon, clove, nutmeg, and lemon and orange rind. Peasant cooking traditions are based on imaginative variations of several basic ingredients (cereals, dairy products, meat, fish, vegetables, nuts) and cooking procedures (stewing, grilling, roasting, baking), while bourgeois cuisine involves more complicated procedures and use of selected herbs and spices. Charcuterie is part of the Croatian culinary tradition in all regions. Food and recipes from other former Yugoslav countries are also popular in Croatia.

Croatian cuisine can be divided into several distinct cuisines (Dalmatia, Dubrovnik, Gorski Kotar, Istria, Lika, Međimurje, Podravina, Slavonija, Zagorje) each of which has specific cooking traditions, characteristic of the area and not necessarily well known in other parts of Croatia. Most dishes, however, can be found all across the country, with local variants.

== Meat and game ==
- Specialities from the grill are called s roštilja, those roasted on the spit s ražnja
- pečeno means roasted
- prženo means fried
- pod pekom means that the dish has been put into a stone oven under a metal cover. The cook puts hot coals on the cover so that the meal is cooked slowly in its own juices. Specialties cooked pod pekom include lamb, veal, and octopus.
- na lešo means boiled in broth or water (lamb, beef, fish)

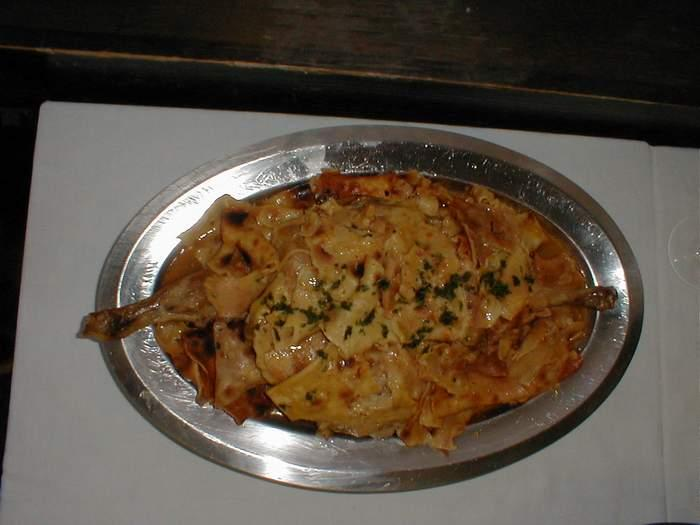
Poultry with mlinci is a popular dish in Continental Croatia

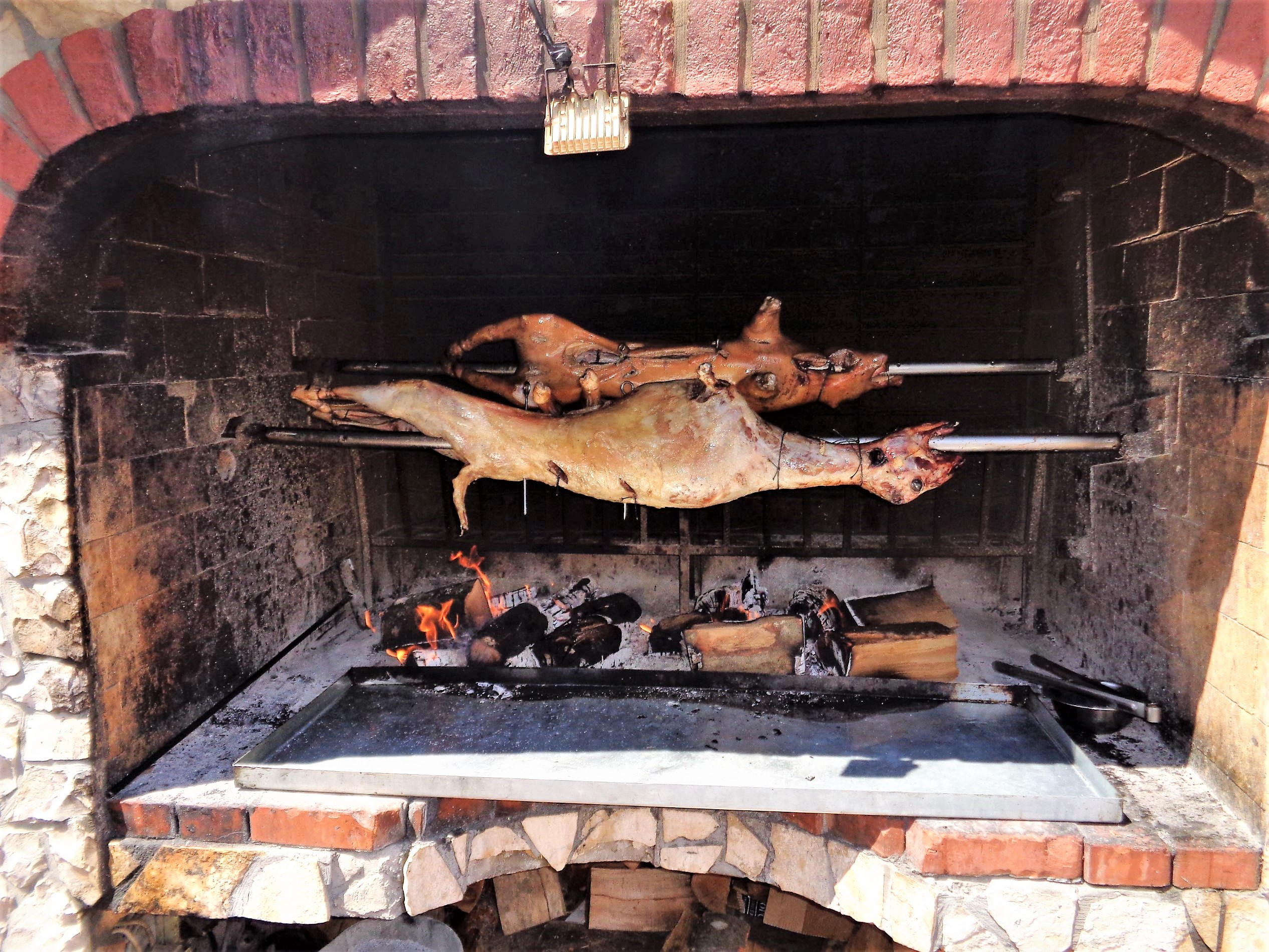
Lamb (in front) and suckling pig being roasted on a roasting spit in Novalja, island of Pag

Croatian meat-based dishes include:

- Pork
- Miješano meso or Ražnjići (skewers)
- Zagrebački odrezak (Veal steaks stuffed with ham and cheese, breaded and fried)
- Šnicle (schnitzel) – breaded veal, pork or chicken cutlets
- Meso z tiblice – pork ham from Međimurje County
- Janjetina – roasted lamb garnished with Mediterranean herbs
  - Pag lamb (Paška janjetina)
  - Dalmatian lamb (Dalmatinska janjetina)
- Odojak – roasted suckling pig
- Fresh game from Dalmatia
- Turkey with mlinci (flat pasta, soaked in roast juices)
- Buncek – smoked pork hock, used in bean, sauerkraut or kale stews
- Leg of lamb à la Pašticada
- Leg of venison the count's way
- Wild duck with sauce
- Polpete, ćufte, faširanci – Frikadeller
- Roasted pheasant
- Kotlovina from Samobor (kettle with knuckle of pork and other meat and sausages)
- Boiled fillet of beef haunch with Sauerkraut
- Escalope à la Baron Trenk (spicy-rolled Schnitzel)
- Međimurje Goose (stuffed with buckwheat)
- Turopolje Goose (with corn semolina as a side dish)
- Purgerica Turkey (Christmas dish from the bordering region to Zagreb, turkey filled with chestnuts, apples, bacon, lemons, etc.)
- Krvavice, or čurke, blood sausages, made of blood and kaša
- Hladetina, a particular type of head cheese
- Edible dormouse

== Seafood ==
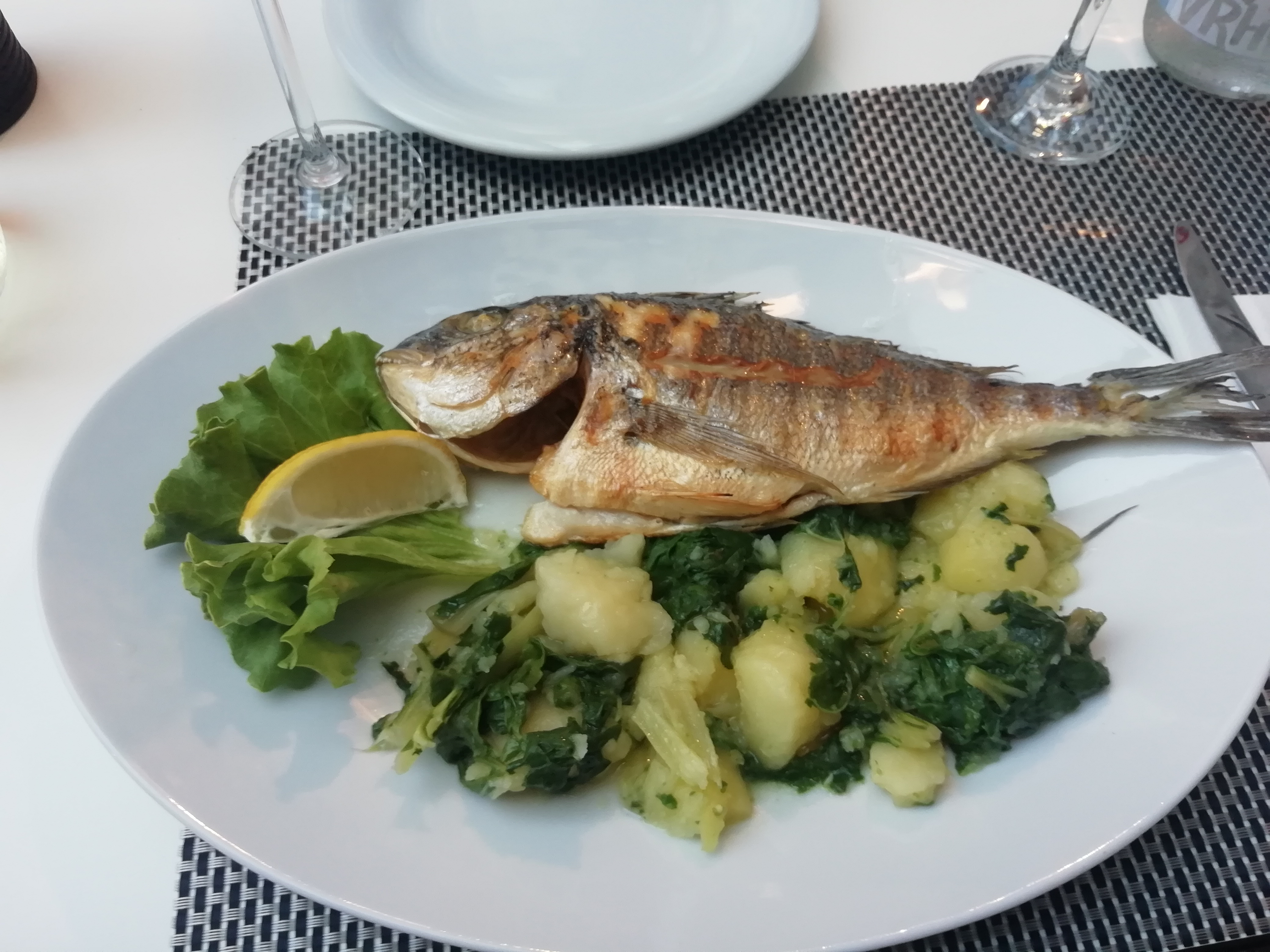
Fish with vegetables

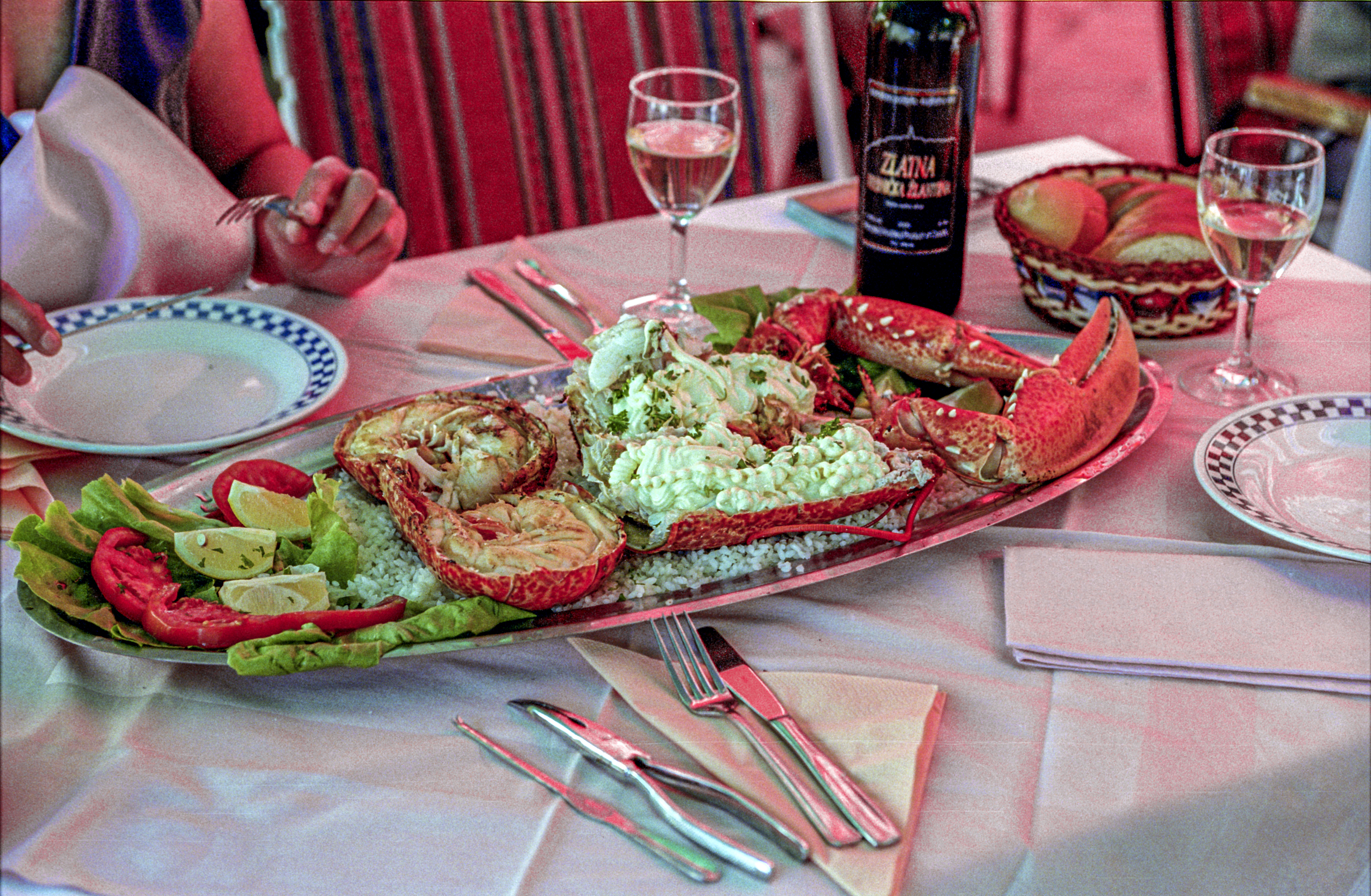
Lobster from Dalmatia

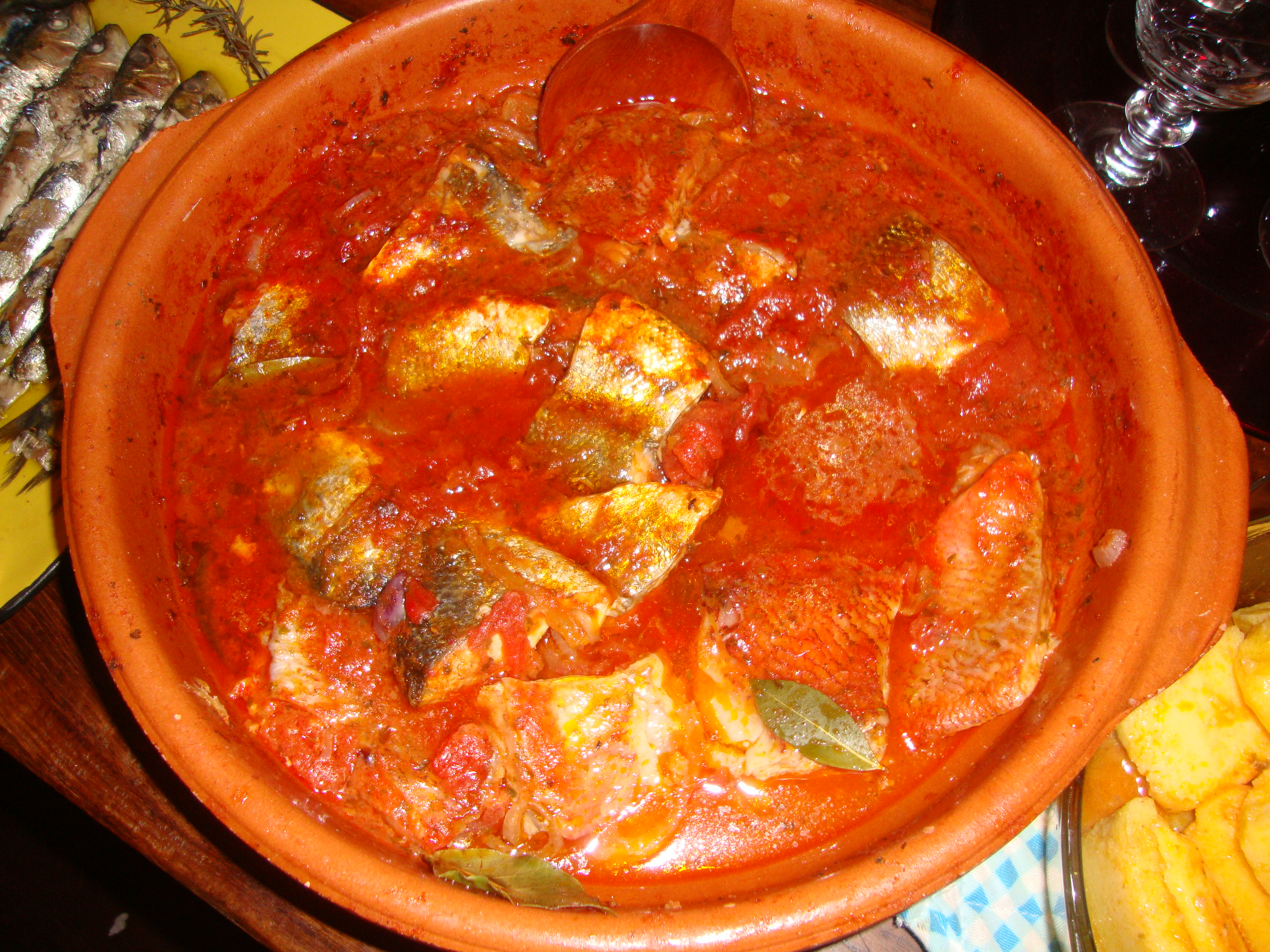
Brodet

Croatian seafood dishes include:

- Squid – Croatian: lignje, grilled, fried, stuffed or prepared as stew and served with polenta
- Octopus salad – Croatian: salata od hobotnice; octopus can also be prepared brudet style, with red wine, or baked pod pekom
- Cuttlefish risotto – Croatian: Crni rižot
- Tuna
- Scampi – Croatian: škampi
- Common mussels – Croatian: dagnje
- Salted cod is imported, but dishes are very popular for Christmas Eve or on Good Friday. It can be prepared either as bakalar na bijelo (Dubrovnik, Dalmatia, Istria and Kvarner, with olive oil and garlic, with or without potatoes), or as bakalar na crveno, in tomato-based stew, with potatoes.
- Fish stew – Croatian brodet or brudet (Dubrovnik and Dalmatia), best made with several type of fish (red rascasse, European conger, monkfish, European hake)
- Clams
- Sea spider salad
- Breaded catfish or carp
- Grilled sardines or other fish (na gradele)
- Salted anchovies or sardine (slana riba) are served as hors d'oeuvres or as a part of light supper with povrće na lešo, salads etc.
- Buzara (shellfish sautéed in garlic, olive oil, parsley & white wine)
- Date shells or prstaci are part of the traditional cuisine, but in the 20th century their extraction was banned as a measure of ecological protection

== Stews ==
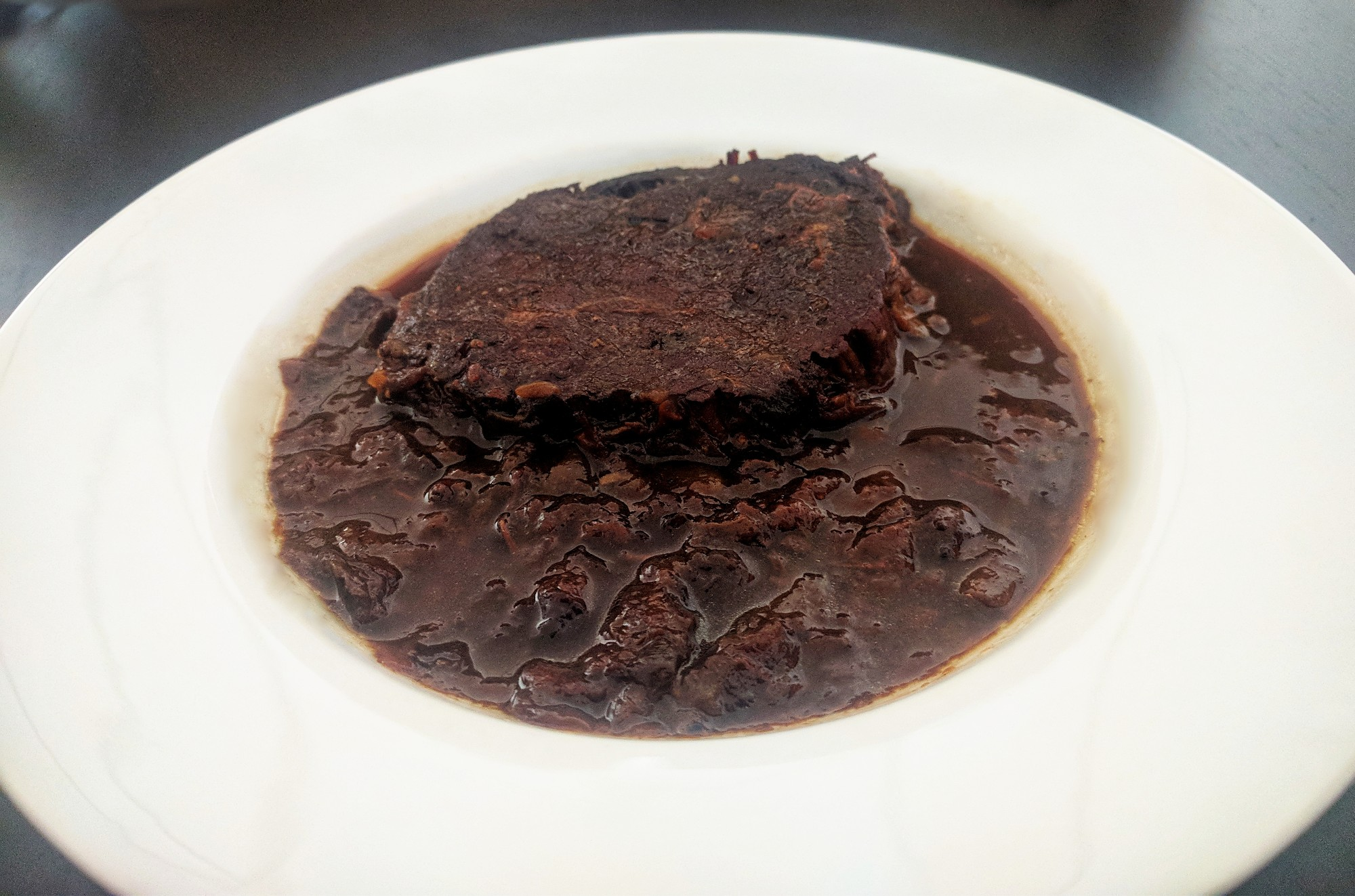
Pašticada

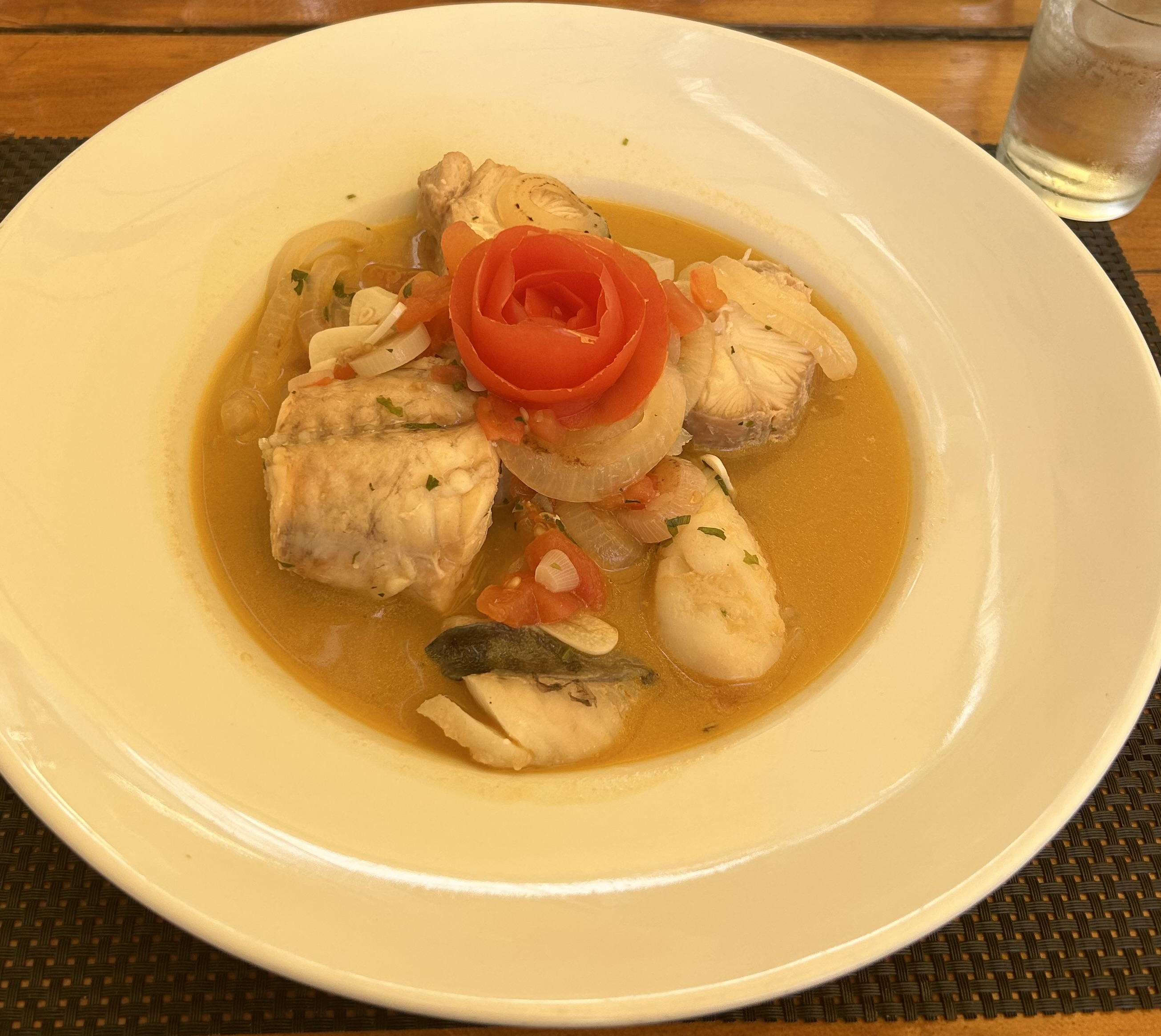
Gregada

Stewed vegetables with a small amount of meat or sausages (varivo or čušpajz) is perceived as a healthy, traditional meal. Sour cream (in Northern Croatia) or olive oil (on the coast) can be added to the plate just before serving. Stewed meat dishes are often prepared by men in open spaces, following hunting and shepherding traditions. In Dalmatian urban cuisine, spices such as cinnamon and clove, Swiss chard (known as "blitva"), dried plums, dried figs, apples and other fruit are sometimes added to meat stews.

- Slavonian čobanac (Croatian: Čobanac is a traditional meat stew originating from Slavonia and Baranja, located in the eastern part of Croatia. The dish is traditionally prepared by slowly cooking all of the ingredients for several hours in a large copper pot that is strung over an open fire.Typically, it consists of a few different types of meat, from veal and beef to wild game meat, along with large quantities of onions, and a special blend of sweet and hot ground paprika which gives the stew its characteristical rich and vivid color.)
- Varivo od graha – pork hock bean stew (often done as grah i zelje – with sauerkraut, or grah s kiselom repom – with pickled turnip strings)
- Gregada - seafood stew
- Varivo od mahuna – green beans stew
- Riblji paprikaš – also called fiš-paprikaš (spicy fish stew from Slavonia
- Slavonska riblja čorba (fish stew from Slavonia)
- Brudet (or Brodet) – fish stew
- Chicken stew
- Rabbit goulash
- Ričet, also known as jačmik, orzo
- Istrian stew (Jota)
- Pašta fažol – bean stew with small pasta
- Shepherd's Stew
- Feines Venison goulash with prunes
- Hunter's stew
- Wine goulash
- Sauerkraut stew
- Zelena menestra – traditional cabbage and meat dish – Dubrovnik and surrounding area
- Pašticada – Dalmatian beef stew with prunes and dried figs
- Tripe stew (tripice, fileki)

== Pasta ==
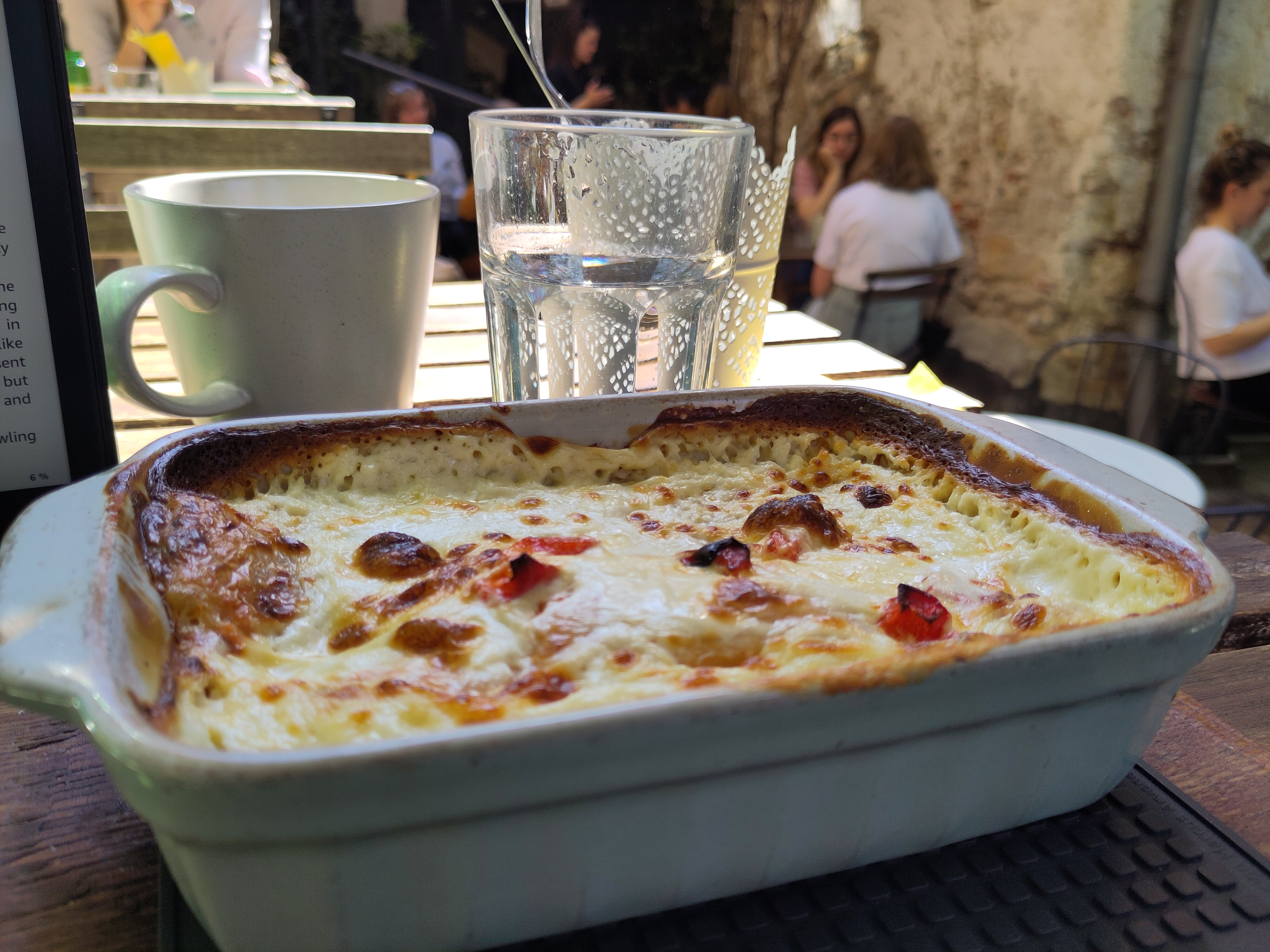
Strukli

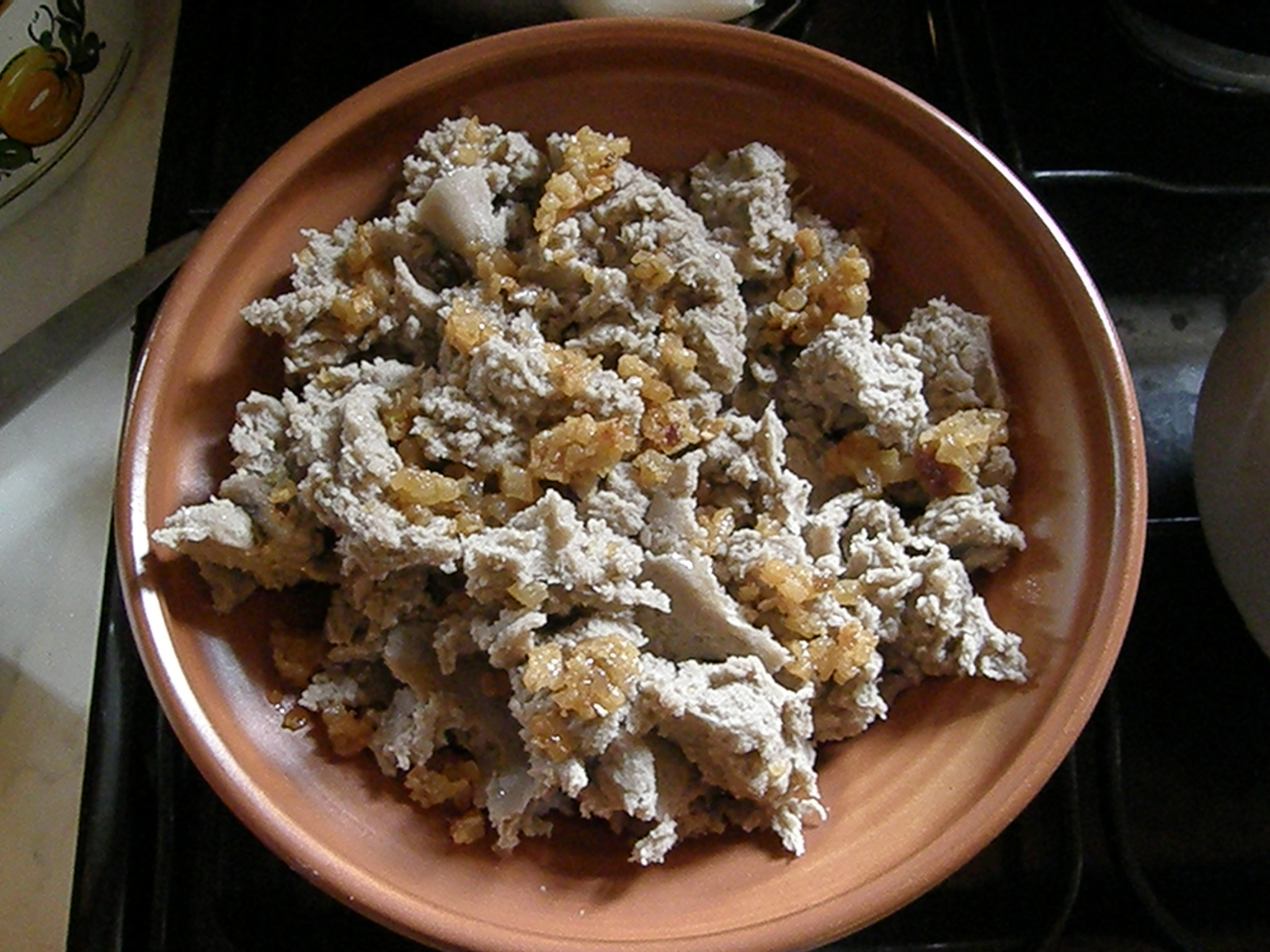
Žganci

Pasta is one of the most popular food items in Croatian cuisine, especially in the region of Dalmatia. Manistra na pome (pasta with tomato sauce) is a staple. The other popular sauces include creamy mushroom sauce, minced meat sauce and many others. Fresh pasta (rezanci, krpice) is added to soups and stews, or prepared with cottage cheese, cabbage, even with walnuts or poppy seed. Potato dough is popular, not only for making njoki (gnocchi), but also for making plum or cheese dumplings which are boiled, and then quickly fried in breadcrumbs and butter.

- Žganci – cornmeal dish in Slovenian and Northern Croatian cuisine, also known as polenta (palenta, pura) in Istria and Dalmatia
- Gnocchi, often served with pašticada or goulash
- Fuži, a typical pasta from Istria
- Šurlice and Makaruni, a typical pasta from Krk
- Needle macaroni
- Štrukli – baked or cooked filled pastry from Zagorje, Zagreb area.
- Krpice sa zeljem – pasta with stewed cabbage
- Šporki makaruli – traditional pasta with cinnamon-flavored meat sauce, from Dubrovnik and surrounding area
- Pljukanci — Istrian pasta rolled with one’s hands

== Soups ==
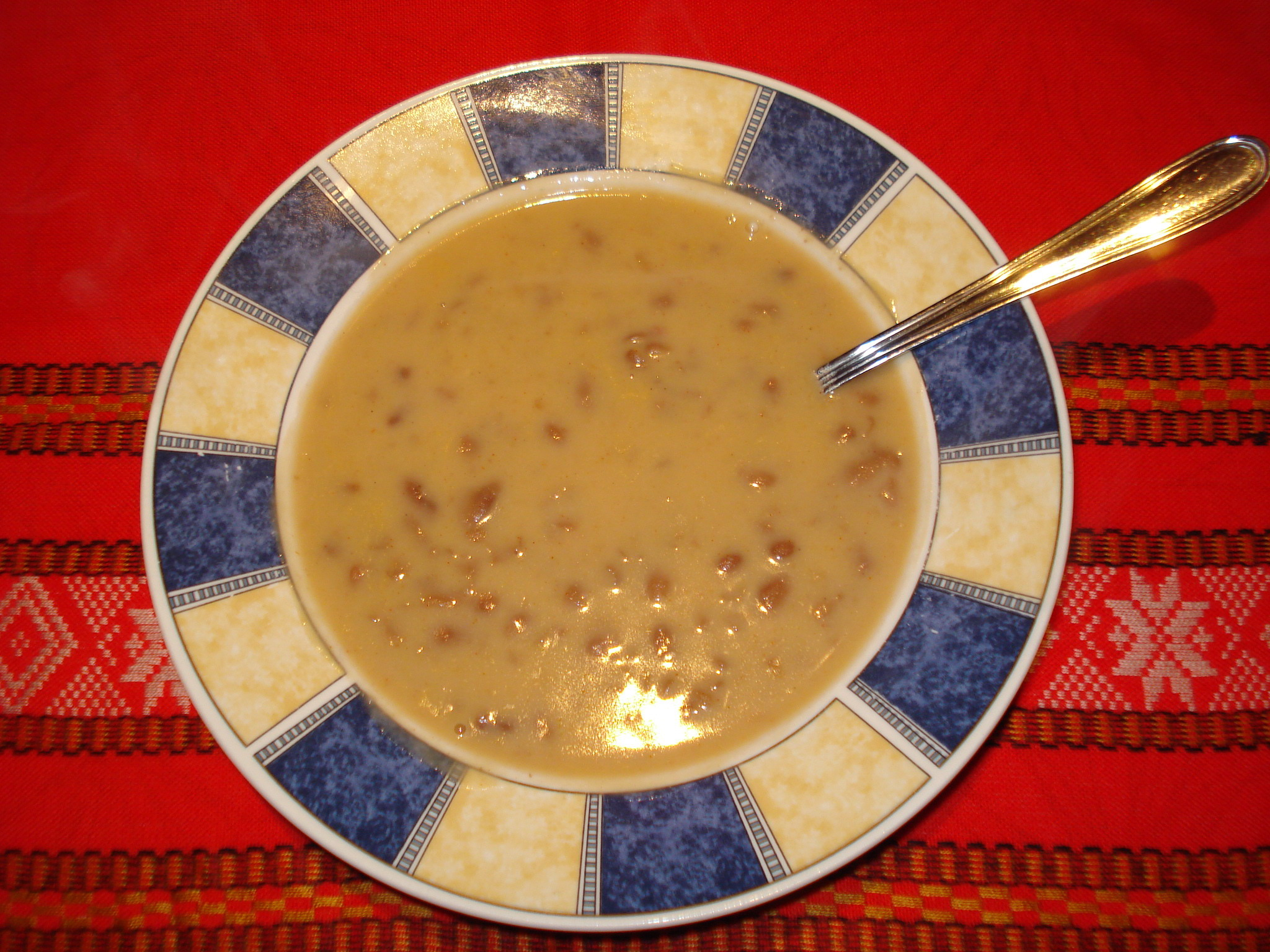
Croatian bean soup

Soup is an integral part of a meal in Croatia and no Sunday family meal or any special occasion will go without it. The most popular soups are broth-based, with added pasta or semolina dumplings. They are usually light in order to leave space for the main course and dessert to follow. However, cream or roux-based soups are also popular, and there are many local variations of traditional soups. In Dalmatia, fish soup with fish chunks, carrots and rice is commonly served.

- Maneštra
- Veal soup with smoked meat
- Beef broth with vermicelli pasta
- Mushroom soup, especially with porcini
- Dill soup
- Zagorska juha with porcini mushrooms, bacon, sweet pepper
- Grahova pretepena juha, beans cream soup
- Prežgana juha
- Chicken soup

== Side dishes ==
- Sataraš (sliced and stewed summer vegetables)
- Mlinci (typical northwest Croatian roasted flatbread, similar to Caucasian flatbreads)
- Đuveč (baked summer vegetables, similar to ratatouille)
- Knedle (boiled dumplings)
- Mišanca (mix of wild plants and herbs)

== Other ==
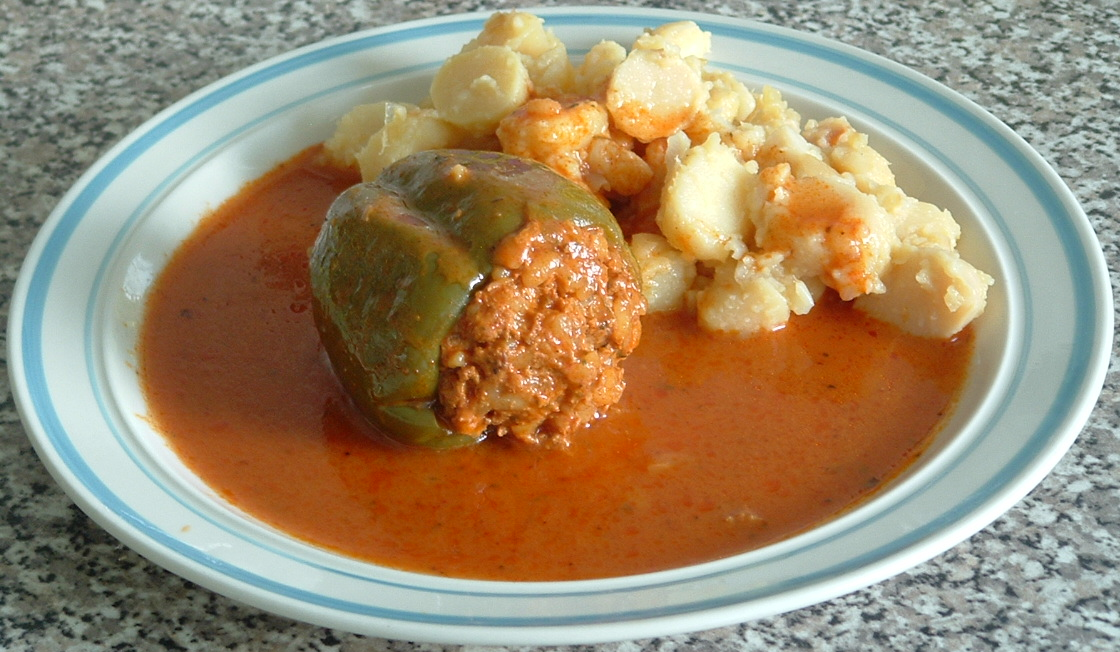
Punjena paprika

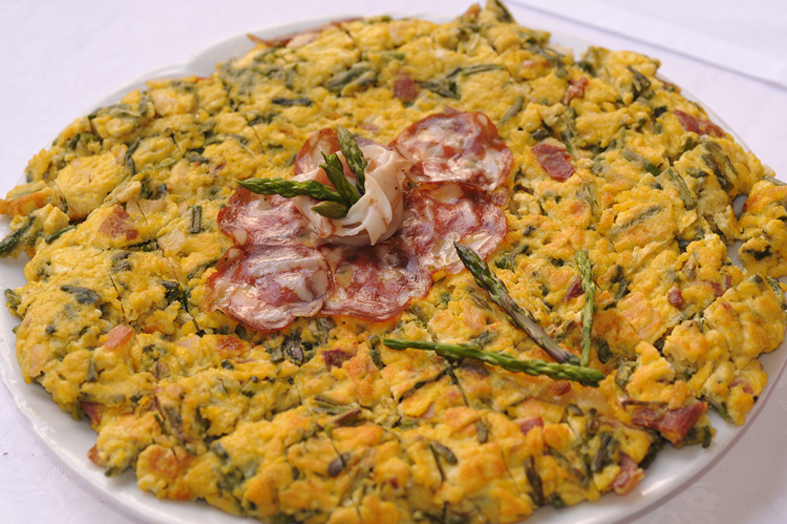
Fritaja

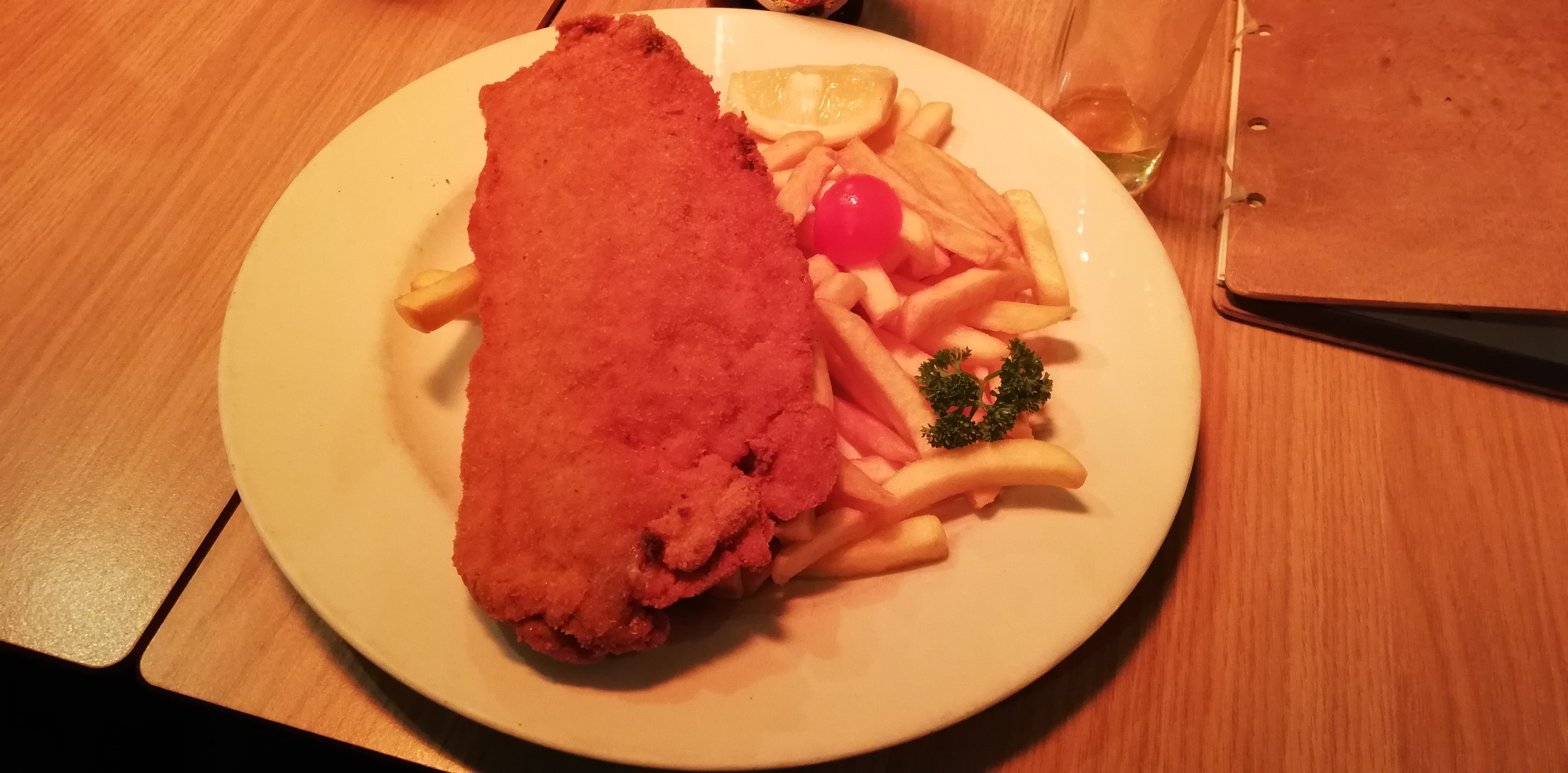
Zagrebački odrezak

- Zagrebački odrezak – breaded escalope stuffed with ham and cheese, type of cordon bleu
- Baron Trenck's steak - veal or pork stuffed with Slavonian ham, boiled eggs and ajvar, stewed on red onion with mushroom sauce
- Gulaš - made of meat and vegetables seasoned with paprika and other species
- Punjena paprika – peppers filled with minced meat (Turkish: dolma)
- Sarma – Sauerkraut rolls filed with minced pork meat and rice
- Arambaši from Sinj – similar to Sarma, but made with finely diced beef and without rice
- Lepinje – flat bread
- Wild truffles, served on pasta, risotto, or fried eggs (fritaja)
- Croatian olive oil (Maslinovo ulje)
- Paški baškotin – aromatic zwieback (rusk) from the Island of Pag
- Potatoes from the region of Lika (Lički krumpir) – high-quality, large, red potatoes
- Sauerkraut from the Varaždin region
- Cabbage (zelje) from the region of Zagreb
- Artichokes with peas or broad beans
- Slanina - cured slabs of pork subcutaneous fat with or without skin and with or without layers of meat
- Fritaja with asparagus
- Gorski kotar filling (pieces of ham with eggs and bread)
- Čvarci - kind of pork cracklings, with fat thermally extracted from the lard

== Sausages and ham ==
- Kulen (Kulin) – spicy pork sausage from Slavonia
- Češnjovka – spicy pork sausage with a harmonious garlic taste from Turopolje
- Kobasica – spicy, air-dried or smoked sausage (Hungarian: kolbász)
- Salami from Samobor
- Švargl from Slavonia
- Istrian and Dalmatian Pršut – dry-cured ham
- Panceta from Dalmatia
- Špek from continental Croatia
- Kaštradina – smoked mutton or goat meat
- Ombolo

== Cheese (sir) ==
- Paški sir – sheep's milk cheese from the island of Pag
- Farmers' cheese (škripavac) and curd cheese from the regions of Kordun and Lika
- Cheese from the Cetina region (Cetinski sir)
- Cheese from the Island of Krk (Krčki sir)
- Cheese from Međimurje (turoš)
- Cheese from Podravina (prga)
- Cottage cheese (eaten with cream, vrhnje) from Zagorje (sir i vrhnje, often seen as quintessential Croatian traditional food)

== Savoury pies ==
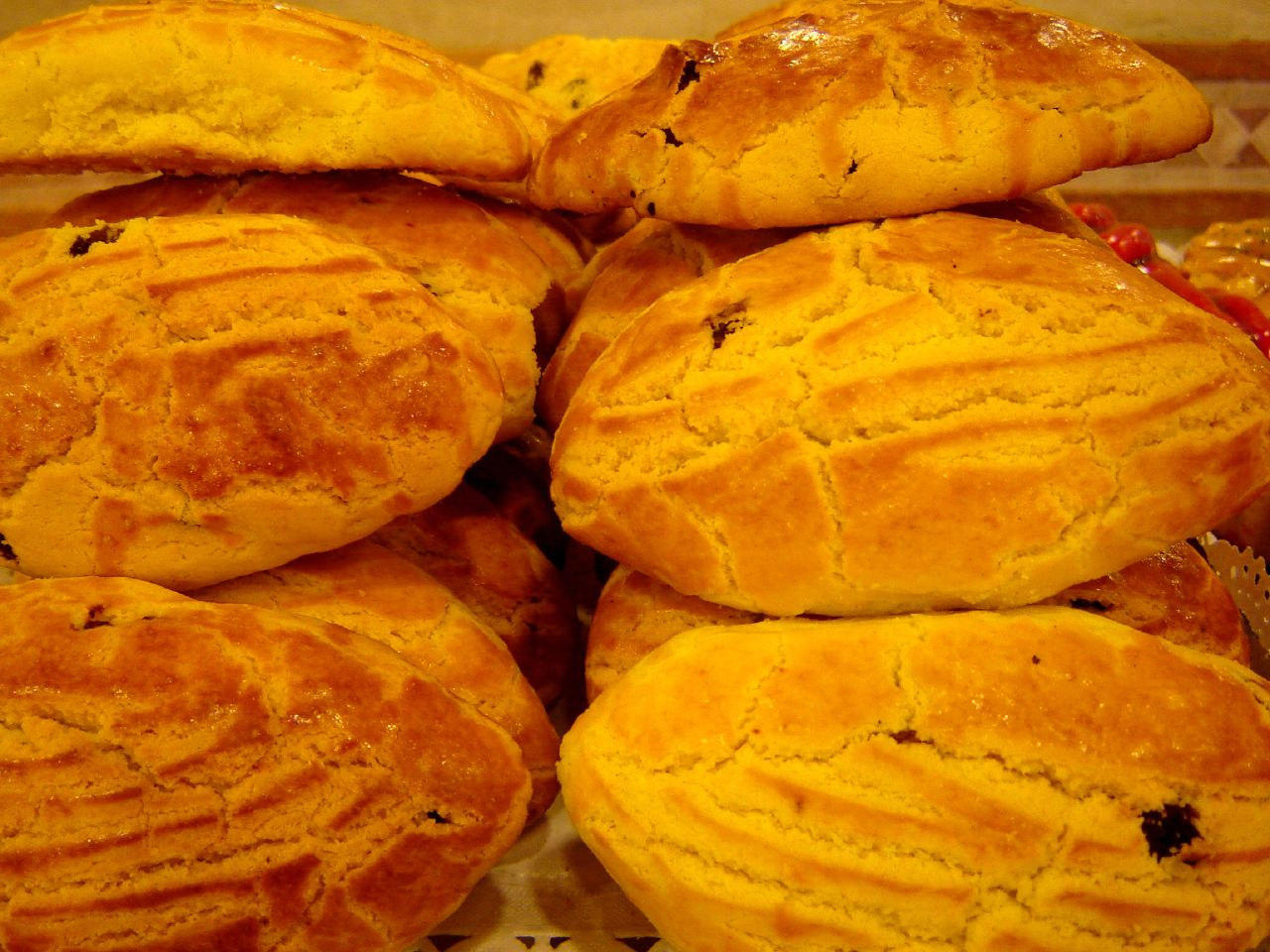
Pogača bread

- Viška pogača is a salted sardine-filled focaccia from the island of Vis.
- Soparnik is a Dalmatian chard-filled pie.
- Duvanjska pita, made from thin phyllo dough wraps filled with potato and meat.

== Pastry ==
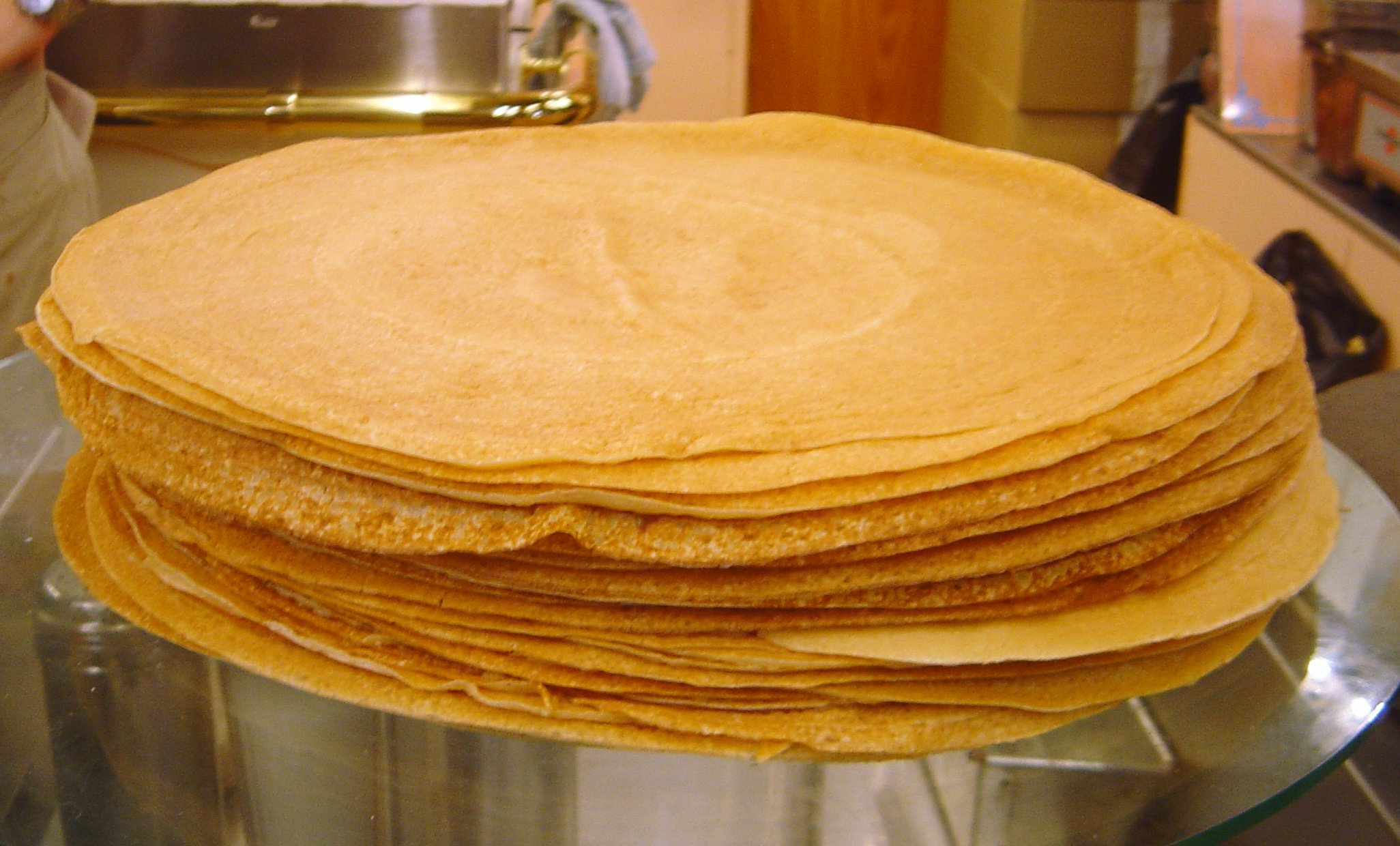
Palačinke

- Zagrebačka and Samoborska kremšnita
- Pita
- Pogača (farmers' bread)
- Povitica

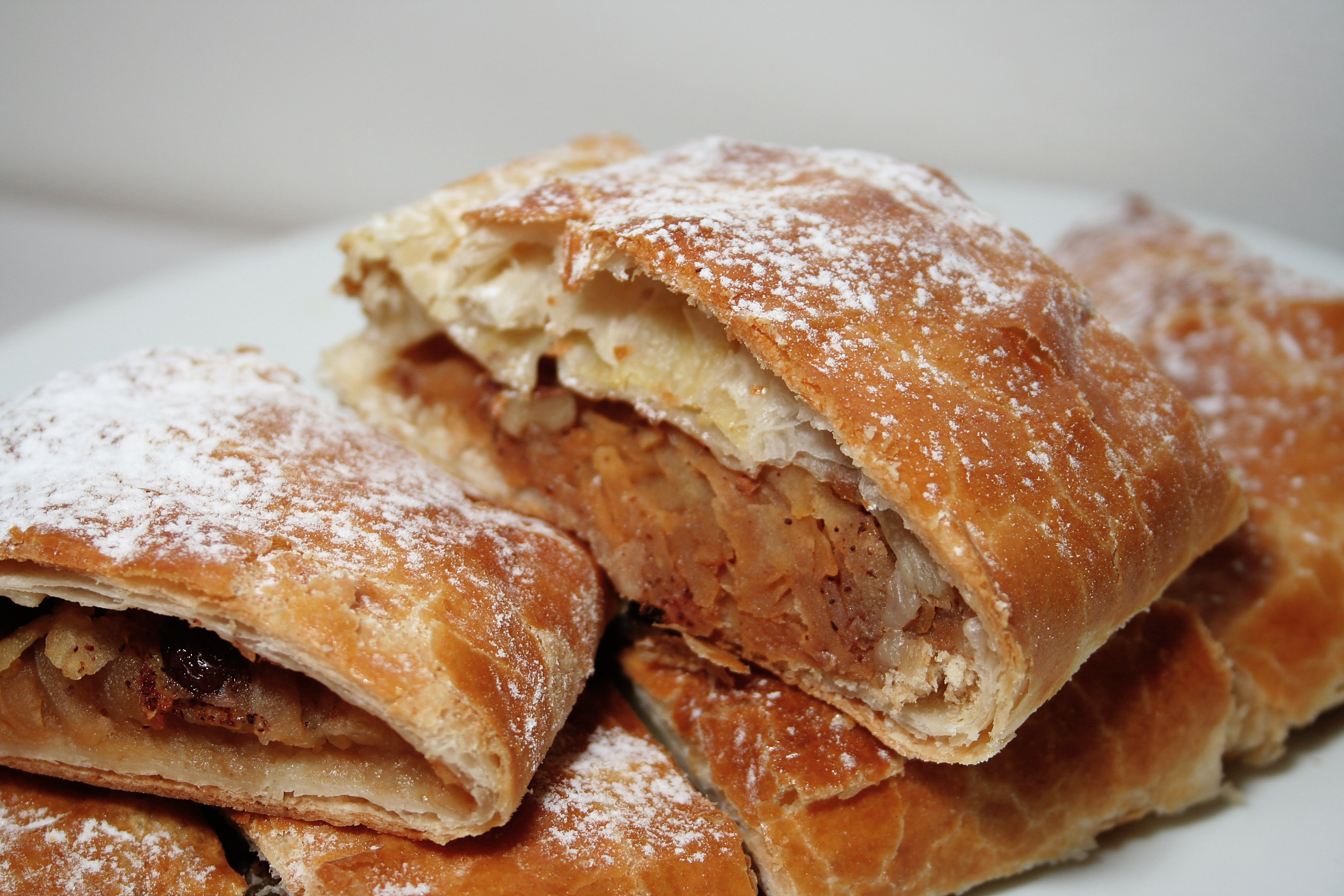
Savijača or Štrudla with apple

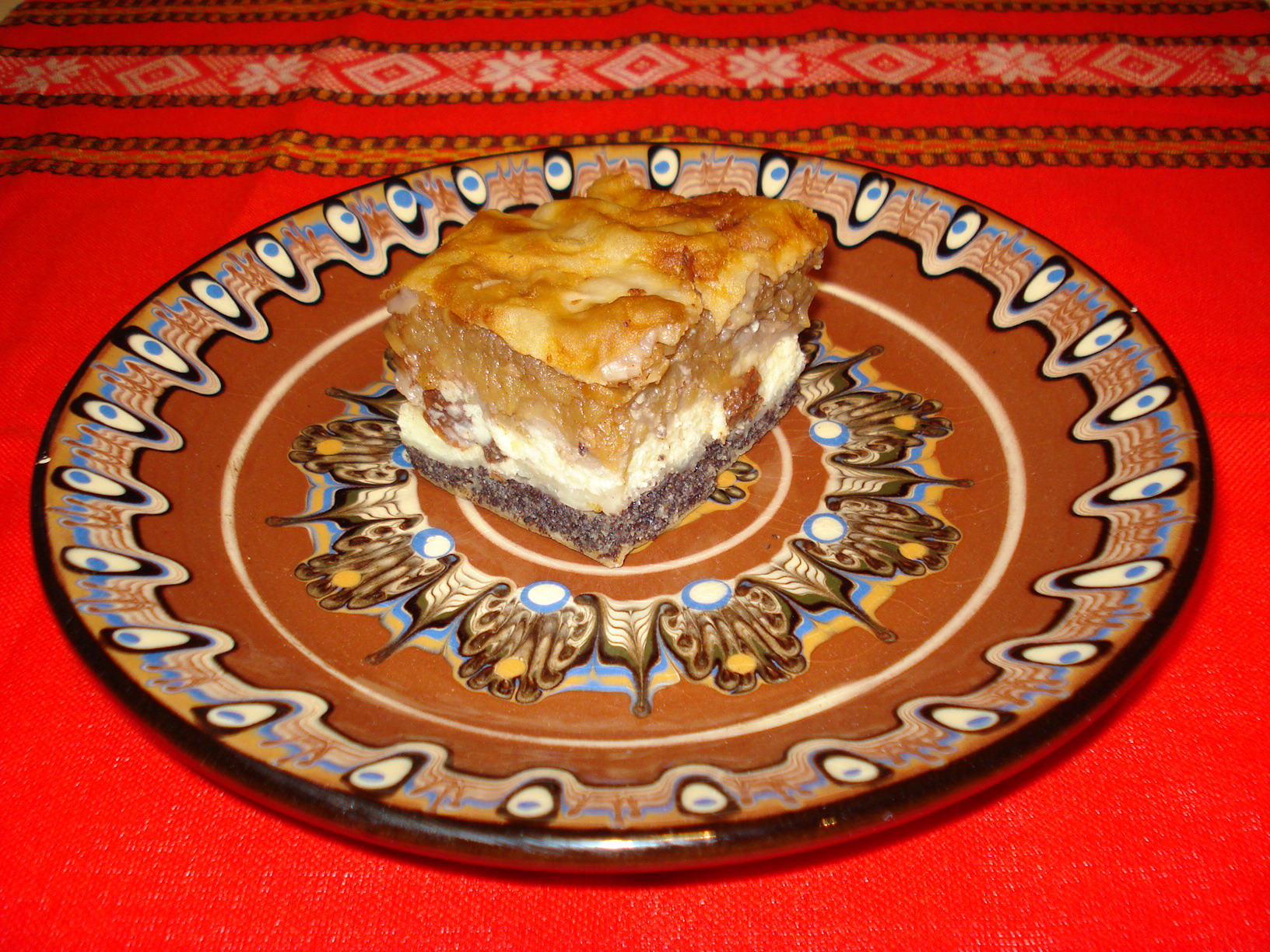
Međimurska gibanica

- Bučnica (summer squash and cottage cheese pie, can be savory or sweet)
- Zagorski štrukli (made with cottage cheese, sour cream and eggs, can be savory or sweet, boiled or baked)
- Zlevanka, simple baked cornmeal pastry with various fillings (e.g. cheese, sour cream, cherries, plum jam, walnuts, nettle)
- Varaždinski klipići

== Sweets and desserts ==
- Palačinke (crepes) with sweet filling (Hungarian: palacsinta, German: Palatschinken)
- Piškote/Piškoti — thin, light, sweet delicate, crispy cookie
- Baklava
- Kremšnita – vanilla slice or custard slice, is a custard and chantilly cream cream cake dessert
- Doboš — sponge cake layered with chocolate buttercream and topped with caramel (Hungarian: Dobos torta)
- Šaumšnita –
- Zagorski štrukli – sweet pastry from northern Croatia
- Uštipci
- Fritule
- Knedle – also known as gomboce are potato dough dumplings, usually filled with plums and rolled into buttered breadcrumbs
- Strudel (Croatian: savijača or štrudla) with apple or curd cheese fillings
- Orahnjača and Makovnjača – sweet breads with walnut or poppy seeds
- Croatian honey
- Bear's paw
- Farmer's cheese (quark) cakes (cream cake)
- Krafne, pokladnice – a type of doughnut
- Croatian pancakes (with wine and egg sauce)
- Šnenokli, paradižot (meringue in custard cream, floating island (dessert))
- Almond filled ravioli (rafioli)
- Homemade fruit preserves, jams, compotes
- Čupavci (lamingtons)
- Tiramisu

== Cakes (kolači) ==
- Rožata or Rozata (flan, creme caramel)
- Easter pastry Pinca
- Kroštule (crunchy, deep-fried pastry)
- Fritule (deep-fried dough, festive pastry, particularly for Christmas)
- Bishop's bread
- Guglhupf ring cake (Croatian kuglof)
- Rapska torta (Rab cake)
- Međimurska gibanica (Međimurje County layer cake with apple, poppyseed, walnut and cottage cheese fillings)
- Makarana torta
- Imotska torta
- Mađarica (Croatian layer cake)

== Drinks ==
=== Wines ===
Croatia has 3 main wine regions: Continental (Kontinetska), Coastal (Primorska) which includes the islands and Slavonia, Croatia’s northeastern-most region. The old wine cellars in Ilok date back to the 15th and 18th centuries. It is interesting that the famous Ilok Traminac was ordered by the English Court for the coronation of Queen Elizabeth II. Also, one interesting story coming from one of the employees who save a place during the Homeland War, more precisely during the Serbian occupation of Ilok, when he decided to enclose the wall of one part of the Old Cellar and store it as many as 8,000 most valuable archival wines.

Each of the main regions is divided into sub-regions which are divided yet further into smaller vinogorje, (literally "wine hills") and districts. Altogether, there are more than 300 geographically defined wine-producing areas in Croatia.Istria, Konavle and Pelješac were recognised by Vogue as the best ones in Croatia. There are numerous enological events (fairs) throuought the year (for ex. Vinistra).

In parts of Croatia, wine, either red or white, is sometimes consumed mixed with sparkling water or juice. For example, in Hrvatsko Zagorje and Međimurje, popular combination is white wine and mineral water (mostly Jamnica), called gemišt (German: gemischt, ”mixed”, "mixture"). On the other hand, in Dalmatia is popular bevanda (Italian: bevanda, "drink"), mix of vine and still water. Bevanda is common gastronomical motif in cultural representations of Dalmatia and its people in popular culture.

=== Dessert wines ===
- Sweet Malvazija
- Muškat Ottonel (see: Muscat grape)
- Prošek
- Traminac

=== White wines ===
- Rajnski Rizling
- Žlahtina, Vitis vinifera from Vrbnik (Vrbnik polje) at the Krk island, also known as "Vrbnička žlahtina”
- Malvazija
- Graševina

=== Red wines ===
- Babić
- Plavac Mali
- Postup
- Frankovka

=== Beers (pivo) ===
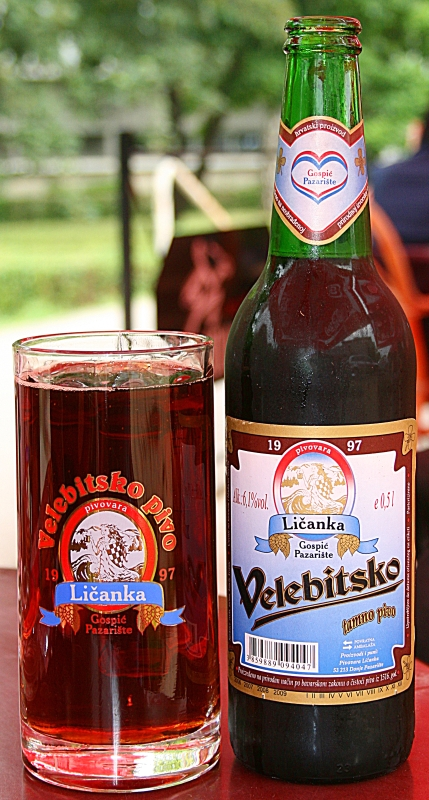
Velebitsko pivo, beer from Croatia

Apart from imported beers (Heineken, Tuborg, Gösser, Stella Artois, etc.), there are home-brewed and locally brewed beers in Croatia. A brewery based in Split produces Bavarian Kaltenberg beer by licence of the original brewery in Germany.

- Karlovačko: brewed in Karlovac
- Ožujsko: brewed in Zagreb (the name refers to the month of March)
- Pan
- Favorit: from Buzet, Istria
- Vukovarsko: from Vukovar
- Osječko: from Osijek (oldest brewery in Croatia)
- Tars pivo: from the seaport city of Rijeka
- Tomislav: dark beer from Zagreb
- Velebitsko pivo: brewed near Gospić on the Velebit mountain, the dark beer has been voted best beer by an English beer fan website.

Recent craft beer breweries are:

- Medvedgrad Brewery, from Zagreb, established in 1994
- Grif microbrewery, Zagreb

=== Liqueurs and spirits ===
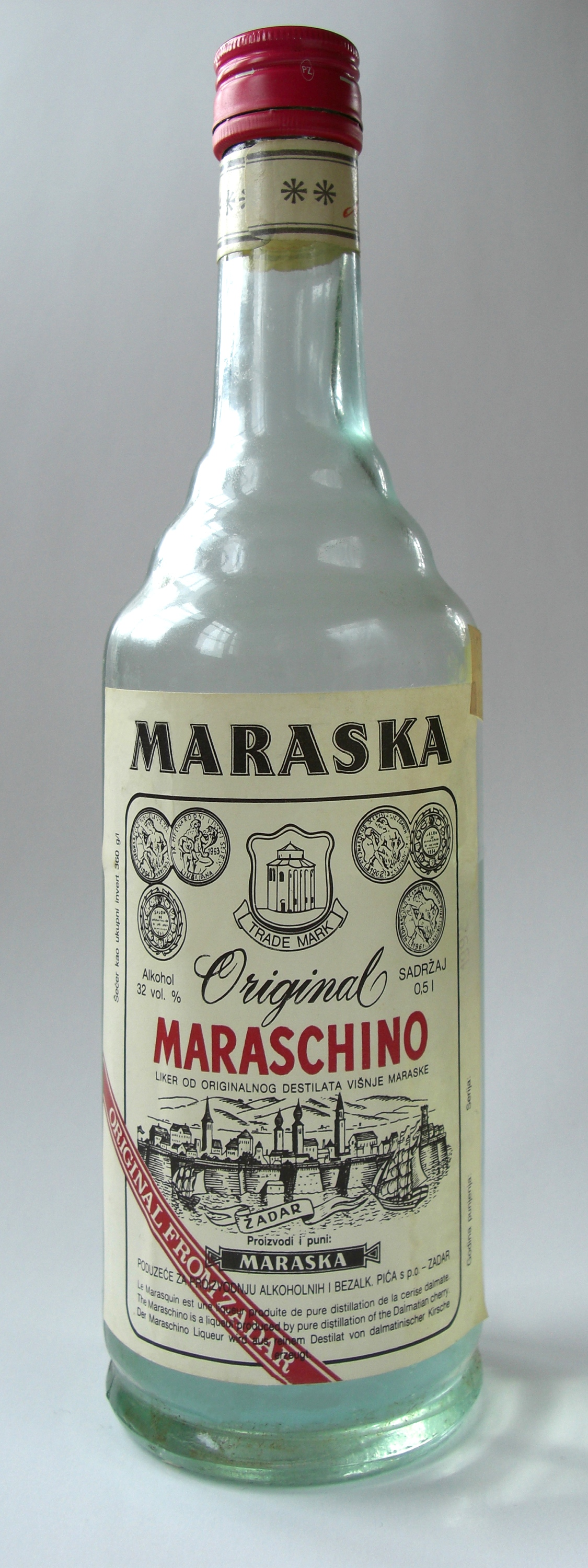
A bottle of Maraschino liqueur.

- Maraschino
- Rakija (Croatian name for spirits), commonly made from: Lozovača / Loza (grapes) (it.: Grappa),Travarica (Loza with herbs), Šljivovica (plums), Kruškovac (pears), Drenovac (cherries)
- Pelinkovac
- Orahovac (walnut liqueur)
- Medovina (honey)
- Gvirc (as Medovina, only more alcohol).

=== Coffee ===
Croatia is a country of coffee drinkers (on average 5kg per person annually), not only because it was formerly part of the Austrian-Hungarian Empire, but also because it bordered the former Ottoman Empire. Traditional coffee houses similar to those in Vienna are located throughout Croatia.

=== Mineral water ===
Regarding its water resources, Croatia has a leading position in Europe. Concerning water quality, Croatian water is greatly appreciated all over the world. Due to a lack of established industries there have also been no major incidents of water pollution.

- Jamnica – Winner of the Paris AquaExpo for best mineral water of 2003
- Lipički studenac
- Jana – also belongs to Jamnica, best aromatized mineral water (Eauscar 2004)

=== Juices and syrups ===
- Badel
- Jamnica
- Maraska
- Dona
- Vindija juices – Vindi sokovi
- Cedevita
- Zvečevo

== Protected products ==
There are 46 Croatian agricultural and food products registered in the European Union as a protected designation of origin. or a protected designation of geographical origin.

They include cheese, honey, meat, fruits and vegetables, olive and other oils, pastry and sea products.

== See also ==
- List of Croatian dishes
- Croatian wine
- Croatian brands
