= Diet of Croatia =

Diet of Croatia may refer to:

- Croatian Parliament, historically known as the Diet of Croatia
- Croatian cuisine, the food of the regions of Croatia

== See also ==
- Diet of Croatia-Slavonia, the parliament of Kingdom of Croatia-Slavonia from 1868 to 1918
