= Molve gas project =

Gas project in Croatia

The Molve gas project (Croatian: Pogon Molve) is a natural gas extraction project in northern Croatia operated by INA, the national oil company. The Molve project is headquartered in Đurđevac in the Koprivnica-Križevci County and includes eight gas fields in the Podravina basin: the four main fields are Molve, Kalinovac, Stari Gradac and Gola Duboka, in addition to four smaller ones called Ferdinandovac, Gola, Hampovica-Čepelovac and Pepelana.

Large natural gas deposits were first discovered on the site in 1974, and the project started operating in 1980. The Molve project produces natural gas, natural gas condensate, C_{2}+ mixture (a byproduct consisting of ethane, propane, butane and higher molecular weight hydrocarbons) and oil. In the period between 1980 and 2005 Molve produced a total of 25 billion cubic metres of gas, and 8 million tons of gas condensate. The Molve project is the biggest and most important natural gas deposit in the country as the four main fields' output makes up 70 percent of the total natural gas production in Croatia, and the gas condensate and C_{2}+ mixture outputs account for around 30 percent of the total primary energy production in Croatia.
