= Pivovara Ličanka =

Brewery in Croatia

- Industry: Alcoholic beverage
- Founded: 1997
- Headquarters: Gospić, Croatia
- Products: Beer
- Number of employees: 20 (2017)
- Website: www.pivovara-licanka.hr

Pivovara Ličanka (lit. "Brewery of Lika") is a brewery in Donje Pazarište, Croatia. It was founded in 1997 by Karlo Starčević. As of 2009, its annual production is one million liters.

They produce the following

brands of beer:

- Velebitsko
- Velebitsko Tamno
