= Fu Zi =

Fu Zi may refer to:

- Aconitum carmichaelii or Chinese aconite, also known as Fu Zi (附子), a flowering plant sometimes used as an herb
- Fu Hao (died c. 1200 BC), whose name was possibly Fu Zi (婦子) rather than Fu Hao, a consort of King Wu Ding of the Shang dynasty
- After This Our Exile (父子), a 2006 Hong Kong film set in Malaysia
- Fu Zi (傅子), a 3rd-century Chinese text by Fu Xuan, largely lost

== See also ==
- Fusi (pasta), or Fuži in Croatian and Slovenian, a traditional Istrian pasta from Croatia and Slovenia
- Confucius (551–479 BC), Chinese philosopher during the Spring and Autumn period, frequently known in Chinese as Fu Zi (夫子)
