= Manestra =

Manestra may refer to:

- Maneštra, a vegetable stew popular in the Adriatic region of Europe
- Manéstra, a Greek name for orzo (risoni) pasta or the tomato based vegetable stew made with it.
