= Fritaja =

Mediterranean Croatian and Slovenian dish

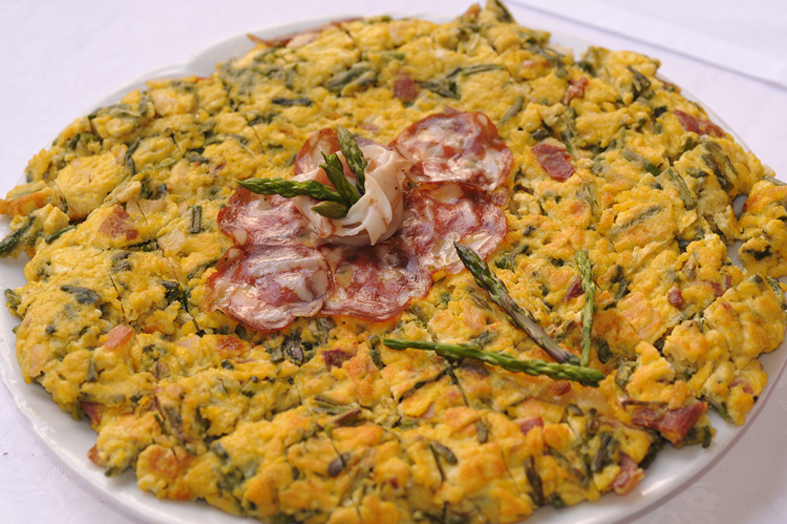
- Place of origin: Croatia; Slovenia
- Main ingredients: Egg, vegetables, bacon

Fritaja (Croatian) or frtalja (Slovenian) is a Mediterranean Croatian and Slovenian dish. Both are specialties in Istria and north from Trieste in Goriška Brda and in Soča and Vipava Valleys. They are especially common in the springtime, as at that time there are many plants and vegetables such as wild asparagus, wild hops, herbs as fennel, mint, feverfew and chicory, tomatoes, young garlic sprouts and spices available to add to egg and some other ingredients, as small parts of old bread. Fritaje are many times prepared throughout the year with ham, mushrooms, sausages, bacon, white or red wine. The quantity of ingredients is never exactly defined.

Both the Croatian and Slovenian names come from the Venetian word fritaia, meaning 'fried'.

== Variants ==
A similar dish, also known as fritaja or frtalja, is also popular in western Slovenia (Slovene Littoral). Here, the asparagus variant is known, but different herbs are also added, especially nettle, chard, and melissa.

== See also ==
- Frittata – a similar dish from Italy
- Tortilla española – a similar dish from Spain
