= Pašticada =

Croatian braised beef dish

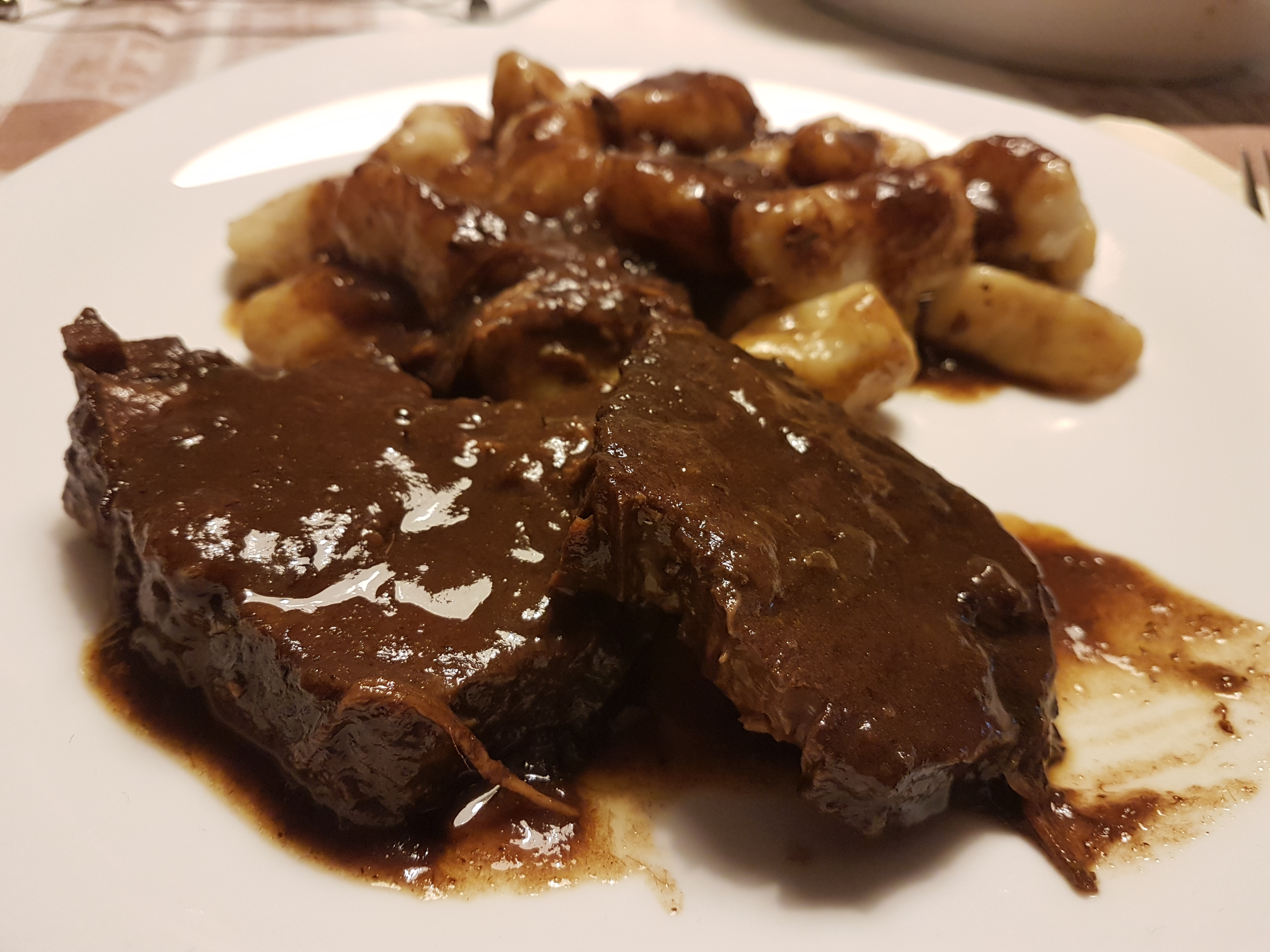
- Alternative names: Dalmatinska pašticada
- Type: Beef
- Place of origin: Croatia
- Region or state: Dalmatia
- Main ingredients: beef, wine, broth or stock, vinegar, cloves, prunes, carrots, celery, onions

Pašticada is a braised beef dish cooked in a fragrant sweet and sour sauce, popular in Croatia. It is often called Dalmatinska pašticada because it originates in Dalmatia, where it is served at festivities and gatherings. The meal requires long and meticulous preparation. The meat, usually a whole eye of round, is pierced and stuffed with garlic, cloves, carrot, celery, and bacon, and marinated in wine vinegar overnight. It is then seared and simmered with onions, parsley root, prunes, wine, broth or stock, and sweet prošek wine for several hours. The meat is cut into thick slices and additionally cooked in the resulting sauce.

Pašticada is usually served with gnocchi or homemade pasta.

== History ==
The exact origins of pašticada remain somewhat elusive. According to one theory, its roots trace back to French cuisine, introduced during the Napoleonic conquest, during which Dalmatia was under French rule. A variation of pašticada called 'pastitsada'' is also found on the Greek island of Corfu, which was also conquered by the French in the 19th century. Interestingly, both Dalmatia and Corfu were once ruled by Venice, which adds another layer to the culinary exchange since alternartive hypothesis suggests connections to Italian culinary traditions, particularly the Veronese dish known as 'pastissáda de cavál', with its origins stemming from a blend of Venetian, Dalmatian, and ancient influences. The oldest known recipe for Dalmatian pašticada dates back to the fifteenth century and is documented in Dubrovnik.

== See also ==
- Croatian cuisine
