= Gregada =

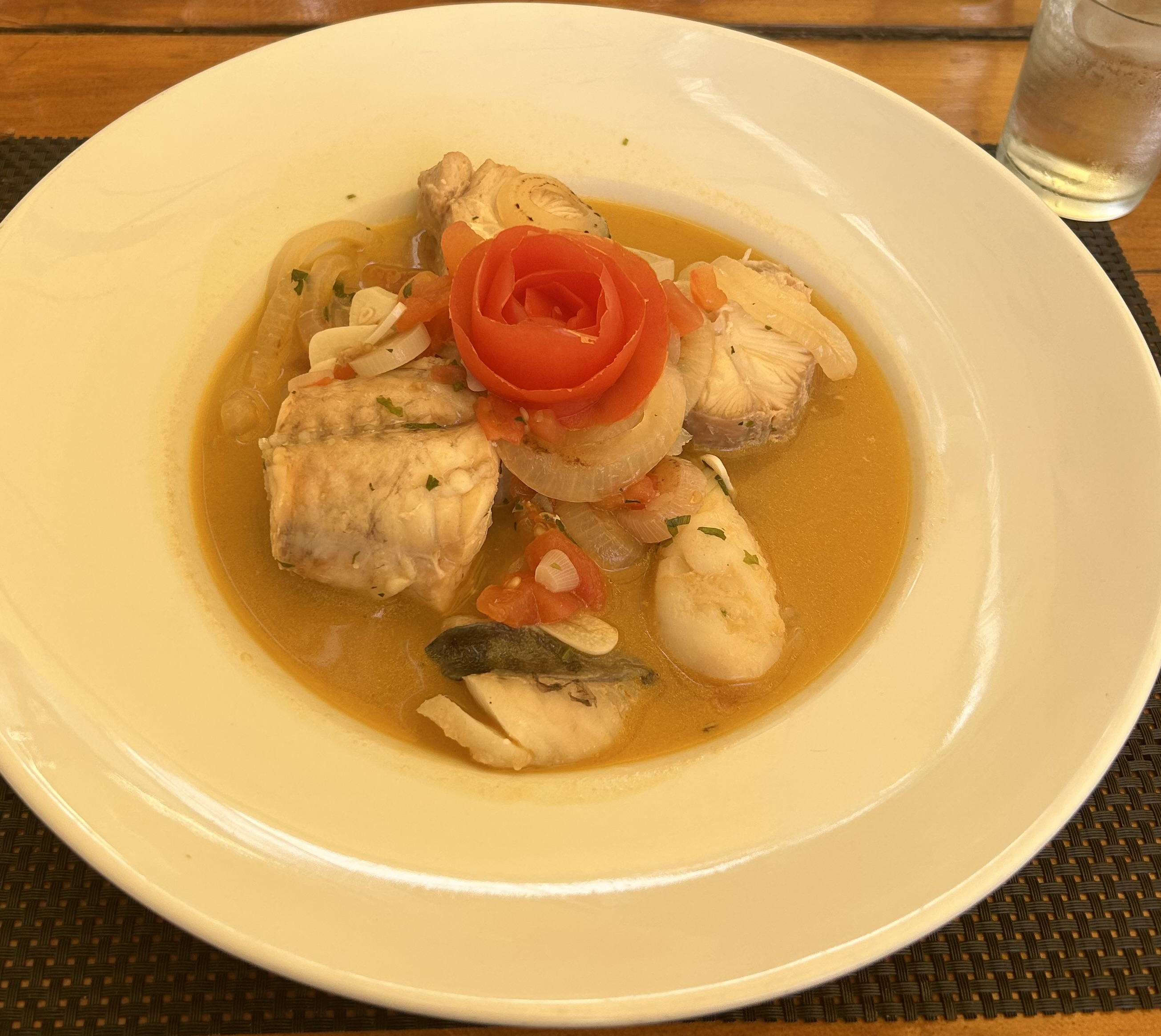
Gregada served in Stari Grad, island of Hvar

Gregada is a Croatian dish from the island of Hvar. The dish most likely has its origins in Illyrian culinary traditions and is one of the oldest ways to prepare fish in Dalmatia.

== See also ==
- Croatian cuisine
