= Mišanca =

Mišanca or mišancija is a mix of wild plants like wild onion, beet, leek, fennel, chicory, sonchus asper, sonchus oleraceus, edible flowers and herbs gathered from the forest. This specialty of Croatian cuisine is sold in many food markets all along the Dalmatian coast. It can be used to make a salad with capers, olive oil, anchovies and hard boiled eggs.
