= Donje Pazarište =

- Village
- Interactive map of Donje Pazarište
- Coordinates: 44°39′01″N 15°11′32″E
- Country: Croatia
- County: Lika-Senj
- Municipality: Gospić

Area
  - Total: 2.4 km^{2} (0.93 sq mi)

Population (2021)
  - Total: 80
  - Density: 33/km^{2} (86/sq mi)
- Time zone: UTC+1 (CET)
  - Summer (DST): UTC+2 (CEST)
- Postal code: 53213

Donje Pazarište is a village in Croatia, in the municipality of Gospić, located in central Lika. It is 18 kilometres west of Perušić, and 22 kilometres north-west of Lika's largest town, Gospić.

== Etymology ==
In the Croatian language, 'Donje' means 'Lower'. It is theorised that the word 'pazarište' originates from the Turkish word 'pazar', most likely from the years of Ottoman Rule, meaning fair, market, or bazaar.

== History ==
In the 15th century, the location of the village was the Drašković family estate of Zažično, but then destroyed by the Ottomans.

The village church, the Church of Saint Jacob, was constructed in 1700.

== Population ==
According to the 2011 census in Croatia, the village has 125 inhabitants.

- 1971. - 251 (Croatians - 243, Serbs - 7, Yugoslavs - 1)
- 1981. - 174 (Croatian - 172, Serbs - 1, Others - 1)
- 1991. - 307 (Croatians - 307)
- 2001. - 170
- 2011. - 125

== Economy ==
The village is the home of the producer of Velebitsko beer.

== Notable residents ==
- Anka Butorac
