= Anka Butorac =

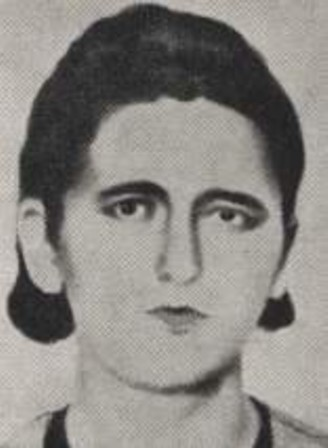
- Born: August 27, 1903; Donje Pazarište, Kingdom of Croatia-Slavonia, Austria-Hungary
- Died: January 22, 1942 (aged 38); Kostajnica, NDH
- Spouse: Blagoje Parović
- Military career
- Allegiance: Communist Party of Yugoslavia (since 1924)
- Conflicts: World War II

Anka Butorac (1903 – January 19, 1942) was a Croatian communist who died in World War II and was proclaimed a People's Hero of Yugoslavia.

Anka Butorac was born in Lika, Croatia. She joined the Communist Party of Yugoslavia and the Partisans and was killed by the Croatian fascist Ustasha in Kostajnica.

== Sources ==
- Narodni heroji Jugoslavije (National heroes of Yugoslavia). „Mladost“, Belgrade 1975.
- Heroine Jugoslavije (Heroines of Yugoslavia). „Spektar“, Zagreb 1980.
