= Rab cake =

Croatian dessert

- Type: Cake
- Place of origin: Croatia
- Region or state: Rab
- Main ingredients: Almonds and Maraschino liqueur

The Rab cake (Croatian: Rapska torta) is a traditional Croatian cake which originates from the Adriatic island of Rab. Its main ingredients are almonds and Maraschino liqueur and it is traditionally baked in the shape of a spiral, although today several shapes are popular.

== History ==
According to legend, this cake was first served in 1177 to Pope Alexander III when he consecrated the Assumption Cathedral in Rab. On that occasion, the cake was prepared by nuns from the monastery of Saint Anthony, and later by Benedictines from the monastery of Saint Andrew.

Rab cake became a delicacy reserved for wealthy families and aristocrats living on the island of Rab in the time when Rab was a part of the Venetian Republic. Today, Rab cake is prepared only for festive occasions like weddings, baptisms, etc. It is also a very popular souvenir because it has a long shelf life.

Rab cake was depicted on a Croatian kuna 8.60 postage stamp issued by the Croatian Post in July 2020.

== See also ==
- Croatian cuisine
- List of cakes
- List of pastries
