= Zlevanka =

Croatian and Slovenian traditional dessert dish

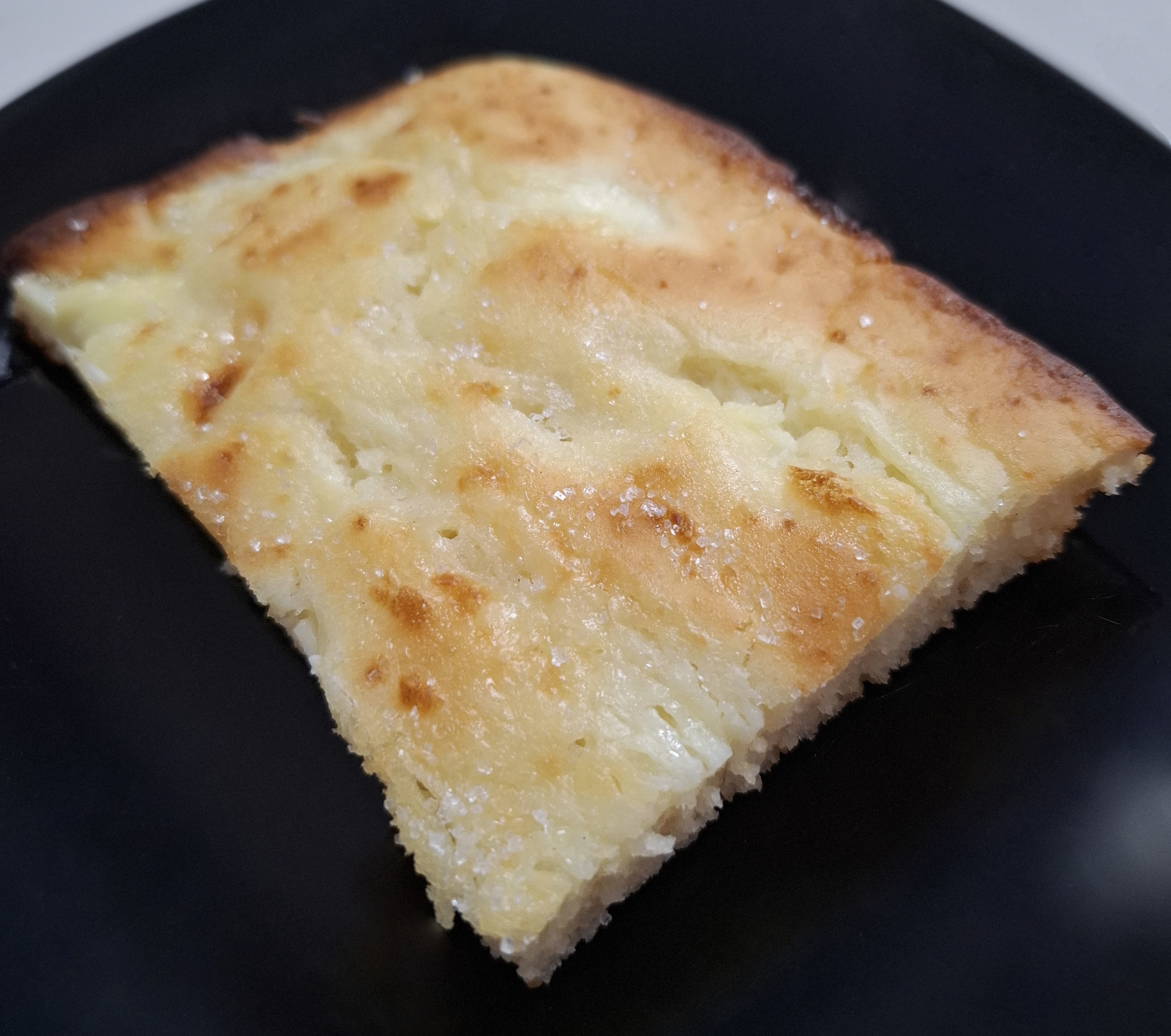
- A variation of zlijevka
- Alternative names: Zlijevka, zlevka, bazlamača
- Type: dessert pastry
- Place of origin: Croatia, Slovenia
- Region or state: Croatia: Međimurje, Hrvatsko Zagorje, Podravina; Slovenia: Prekmurje, Prlekija
- Main ingredients: corn flour

Zlevanka (Note: Other names also include zlijevka, zlevka, bazlamača, kukuruznjača, slijevka or (u)ljevuša.) is a Croatian and Slovenian traditional dessert dish made from corn flour and other ingredients. Sweet and salty versions of the dish exist. It's part of the cuisine of Northern Croatia (especially Međimurje, Hrvatske zagorje and Podravina) and the northeastern Slovenian regions of Prekmurje and Prlekija.

Historically, it was considered a "dish for the poor".

The name zlijevka comes from the way the dense mixture of the ingredients is poured (Kajkavian zliti, to pour out) into the baking tray.

== Preparation ==
The ingredients - mainly including corn flour, milk, sugar, eggs - are combined into a dense mixture which is poured into a baking tray coated with oil or grease. Cream is added in lumps on top of the mixture with a spoon, and then baked at 180-200°C. Sometimes, grated apples or jam are used instead of cream.
