= Zagorski štrukli =

Type of Dish

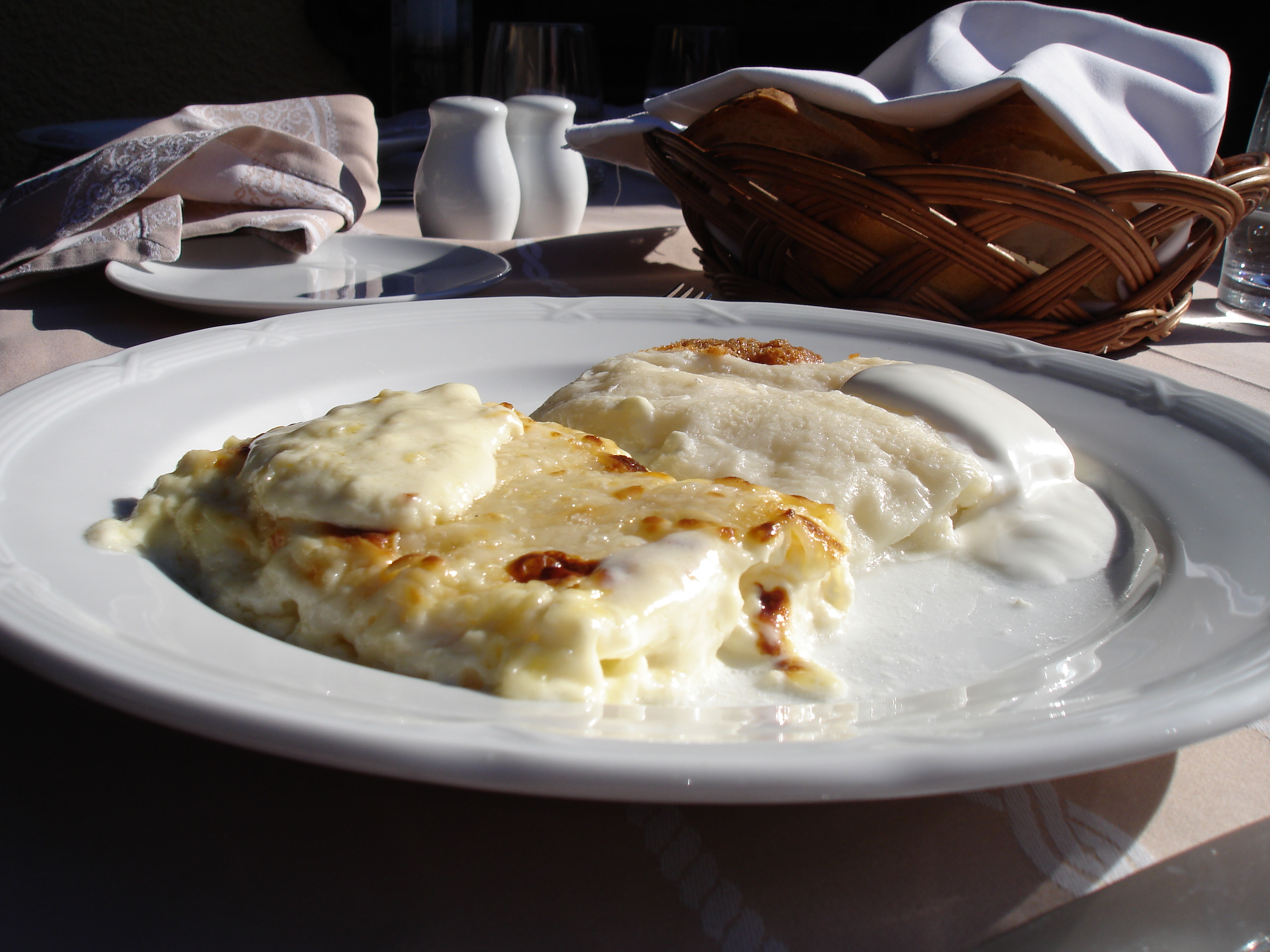
- Cooked štrukli
- Type: dough with filling
- Place of origin: Croatia
- Region or state: Hrvatsko zagorje

Zagorski štrukli or štruklji (pronounced [zǎːgorski ʃtrǔkli]) is a popular traditional Croatian dish served in households across Hrvatsko Zagorje and Zagreb regions in the north of the country, composed of dough and various types of filling which can be either boiled or baked. It is closely related to štruklji, a traditional Slovene dish.

== Preparation ==
The preparations are the same for both boiled and baked types of štrukli. Pastry is rolled out flat and very thin, to cover the table top. A mixture of cottage cheese with eggs, sour cream and salt is spread thinly over the pastry. Then the pastry is rolled lengthwise from both sides into two joined rolls, and finally cut into 10–20 cm long pieces.

For baked štrukli, the pieces are then placed into a baking tray, generously covered in clotted cream, and baked for roughly 45 minutes, until slightly brown on top.

For boiled štrukli, the pieces are placed into a pot of boiling water. Onion and parsley are fried separately until slightly brown, and then added into the pot. The štrukli are then cooked for roughly 20 minutes.

== Cultural heritage ==
In 2007, Zagorski štrukli was added to the list of Croatia's intangible cultural heritage maintained by Croatia's Ministry of Culture.

== See also ==
- Croatian cuisine
