= Slavonian čobanac =

Traditional meat stew from Slavonia, Croatia

Slavonski čobanac
- Alternative names: Pastirac
- Type: Stew
- Place of origin: Croatia
- Region or state: Slavonia
- Main ingredients: Beef, pork, game meat, paprika, onions, vegetables

Slavonski čobanac (English: Slavonian shepherd's stew), sometimes spelled čorbanac, is a traditional meat stew originating from the Slavonia region of eastern Croatia. The dish is typically prepared with several kinds of meat and seasoned with paprika, onions, and other spices, and is usually cooked slowly in a large cauldron over an open fire.

Čobanac is considered one of the characteristic dishes of Slavonian cuisine and is commonly prepared at communal gatherings, festivals, and outdoor cooking events.

== Etymology ==
The name čobanac derives from the South Slavic word čoban or pastir, meaning “shepherd”. The term reflects the dish's historical association with shepherds and rural workers who prepared simple stews from available ingredients while tending livestock.

== Description ==
Slavonski čobanac is a thick, paprika-based stew typically prepared with a combination of meats such as beef, pork, and sometimes game meat. The ingredients are slowly simmered together with onions, vegetables, and spices, producing a rich and strongly flavored dish.

Paprika is considered one of the essential seasonings, giving the stew its distinctive red color and characteristic flavor. Other common ingredients include garlic, bay leaf, and occasionally tomato products.

The dish is traditionally cooked outdoors in a large metal cauldron suspended over a fire, which allows the stew to simmer slowly and develop its flavor. However, it can also be prepared on a stove.

== Cultural significance ==
Čobanac is widely regarded as one of the emblematic dishes of Slavonia. It is frequently prepared at regional food festivals, fairs, and communal events, where cooking in large cauldrons is a common tradition.

As with many traditional dishes, recipes vary between households and local communities, and cooks often adapt the ingredients and preparation methods according to personal preference.

== See also ==
- Sataraš
- Fisherman's soup
- Goulash
