= Maneštra =

Vegetable stew from Istria

Maneštra (from Italian minestra, "soup"; Slovene: mineštra, regionally also pašta fižol; Croatian: maneštra) is a vegetable stew from Istria and made with spring corn, which is popular in the whole of the northern Adriatic seaboard. It is served as a first-course soup if the main ingredients are vegetables, but it can be served as a main course if it is made of "stronger ingredients" such as meat. In Greek cuisine, maneštra is the name used for a rice-like pasta (see orzo), often used in casseroles and soups, or for a tomato-based vegetable stew made with the pasta.

== See also ==
- Croatian cuisine
