= Mlinci =

Food

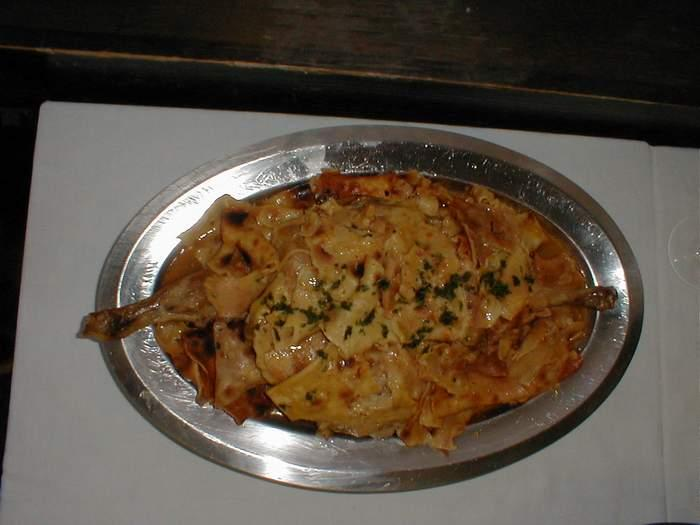
- Roast chicken with mlinci and sauce
- Type: Flatbread
- Course: Side dish
- Place of origin: Croatia, Slovenia
- Main ingredients: Flour, salt, and water

Mlinci is a Slovenian, Serbian and Croatian dish. It is a thin dried flatbread that is prepared by pouring boiled salted water or soup over the mlinci.

To prepare homemade mlinci, a dough is made of flour, salt, and water, sometimes also with eggs and fat. The dough is then rolled out about 1 mm thick and 20 to 30 cm wide, and baked in an oven or on a hot plate. Later it is broken into pieces about 5 cm in size before final preparation with hot water or soup.

Before serving, mlinci can also be quickly fried in poultry fat. Turkey with mlinci is a Croatian folk-cuisine specialty, especially in Zagorje and Slavonia. In Slovenia, duck or goose with mlinci is traditionally eaten on St. Martin's Day. In Serbia, they are usually prepared in the province of Vojvodina, where they are served with a pork or chicken fillet in smetana sauce.

Mlinci can also be served by soaking the dried pieces in the drippings from roast meats. The roast meat is removed from the pan and the broken pieces are placed in the fat in the tray, and then baked for a short amount of time. The mlinci is then served as a side dish accompanying the main roast.
