= Meso 'z tiblice =

Meat dish from the Međimurje region in Croatia

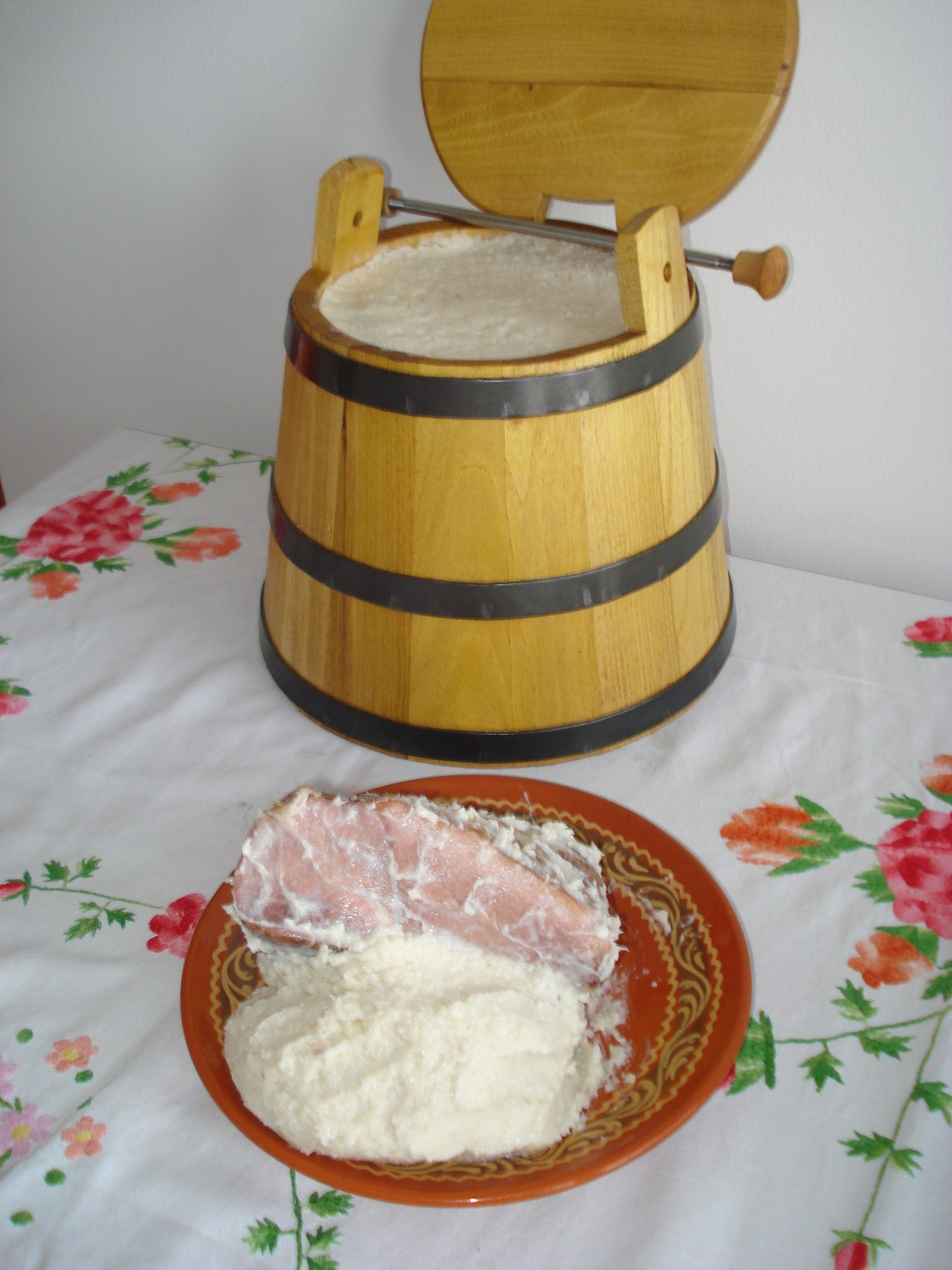
- Place of origin: Croatia
- Region or state: Međimurje
- Main ingredients: Pork, pig fat, garlic, salt, pepper, bay leaves

Meso 'z tiblice is a salty meat dish from the Međimurje region in Croatia. The high caloric dish is prepared by storing previously processed (rubbing garlic and salt, curing and cooking) pork cuts in wooden containers known as tiblica, together with salted pig fat known as slanina. The container is then stored for more than a month for the flavor to mature.

When serving, it is often presented in thick slices, as an appetizer, eaten together with fat, pepper and bread.

== Gallery ==
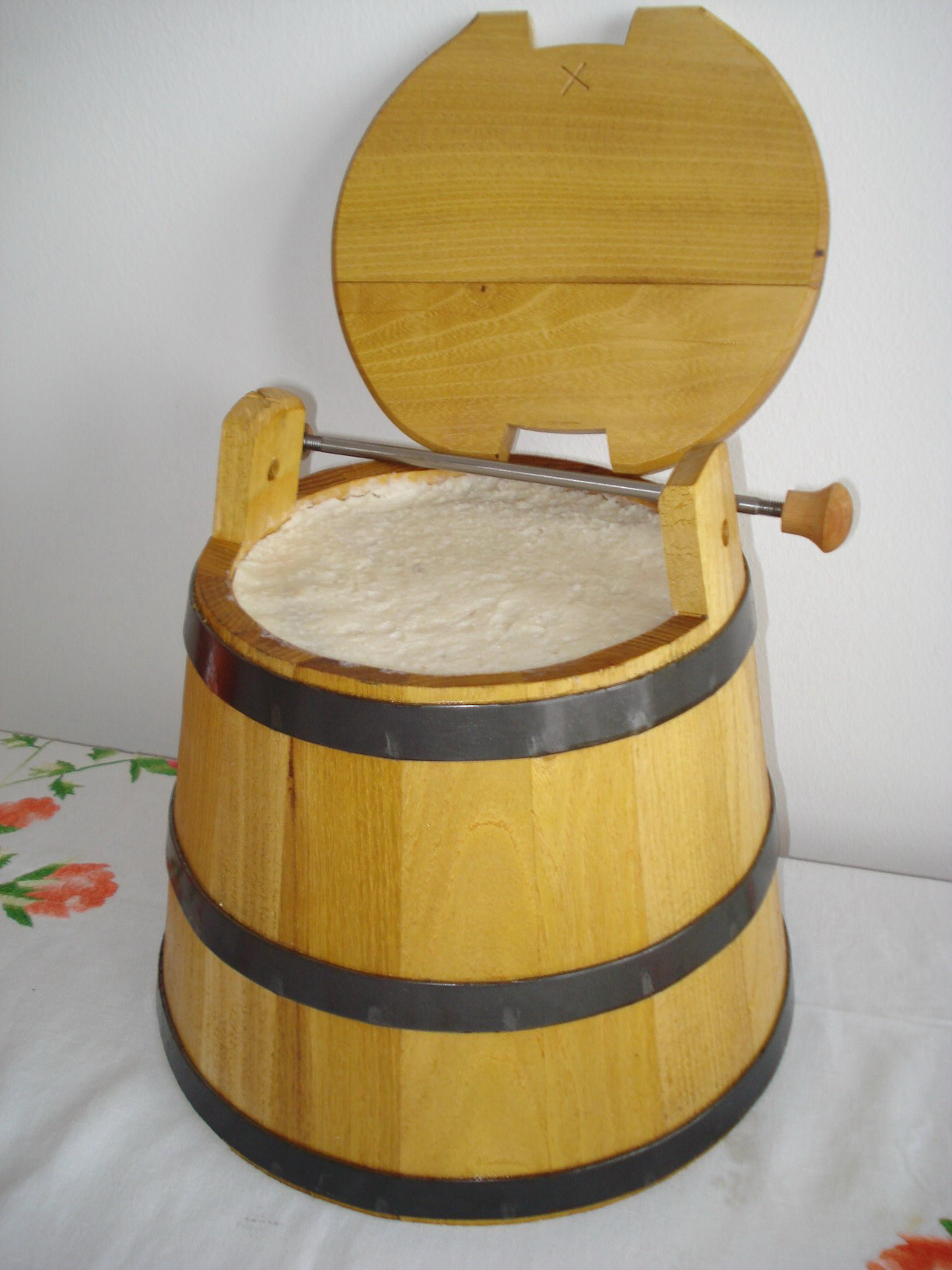
Tiblica

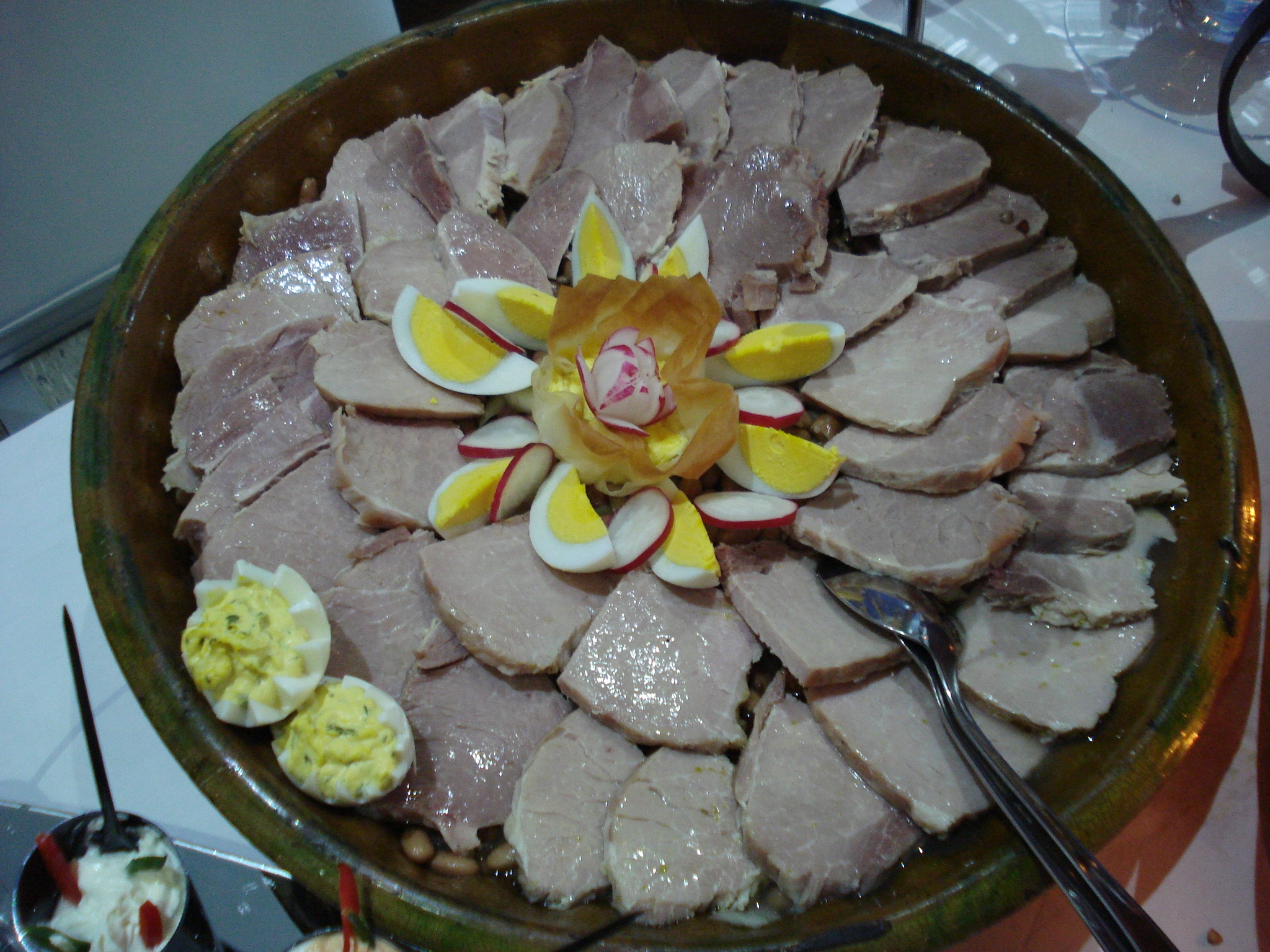
Cold slices

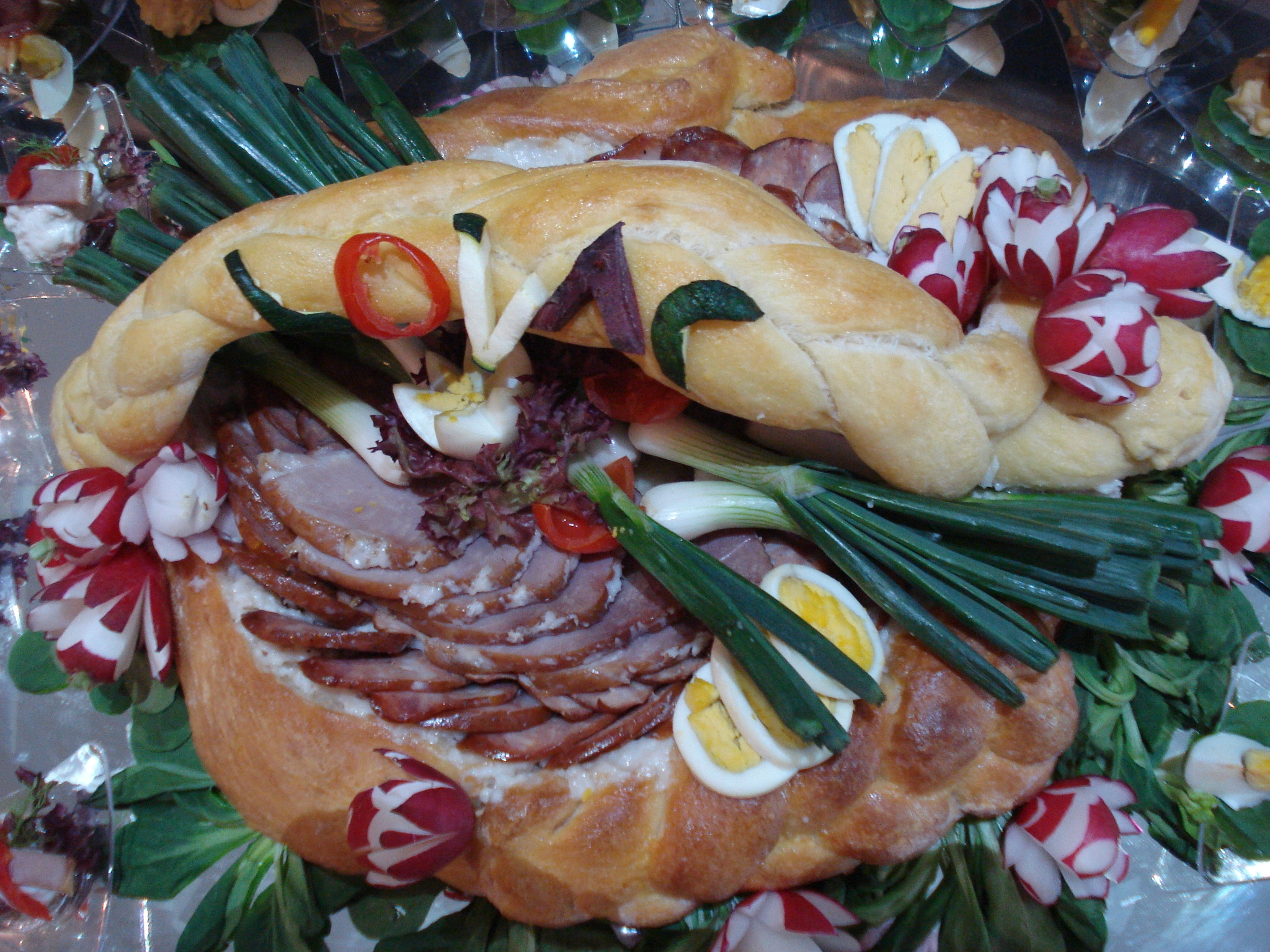
Arrangement

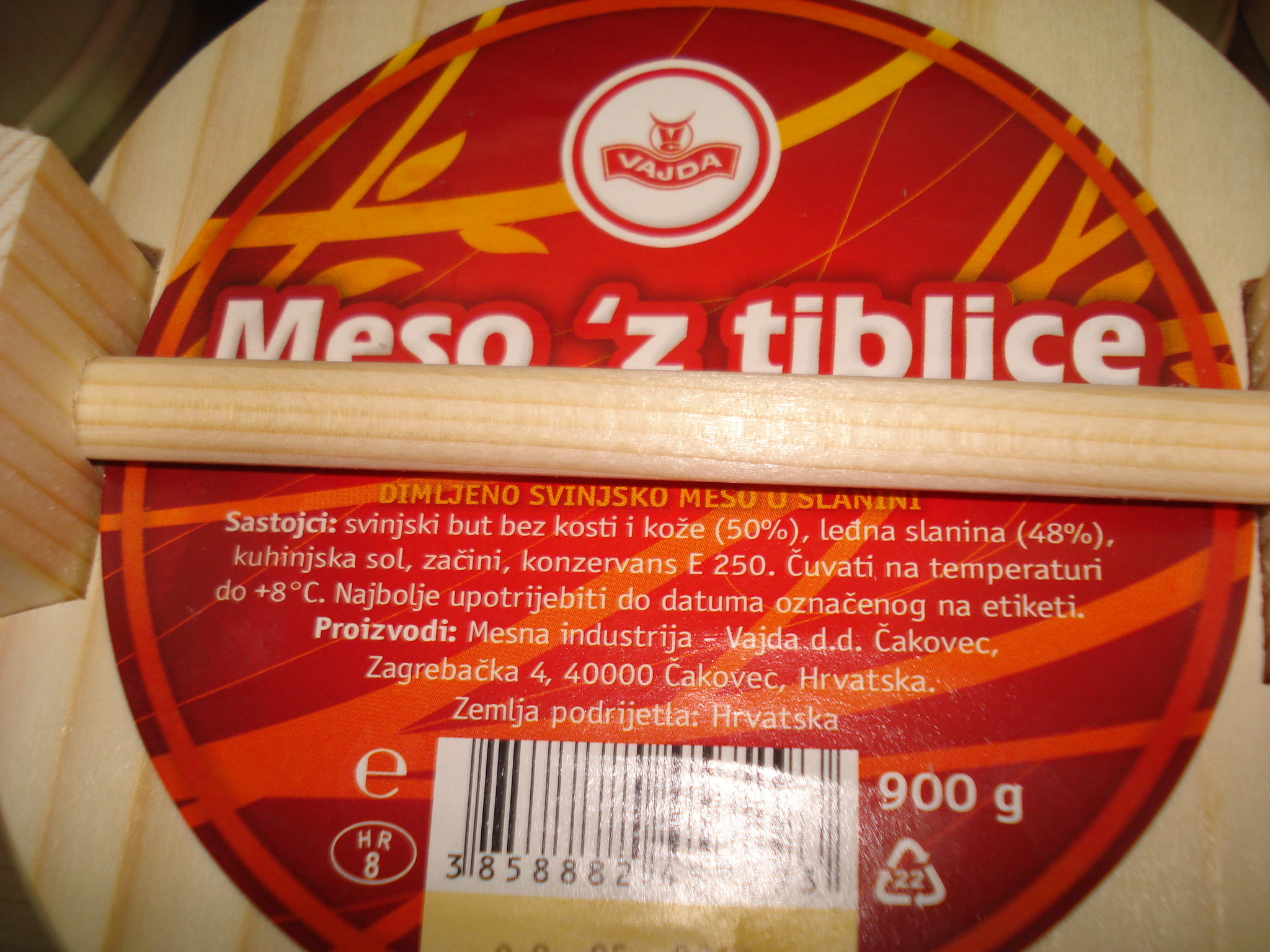
Product

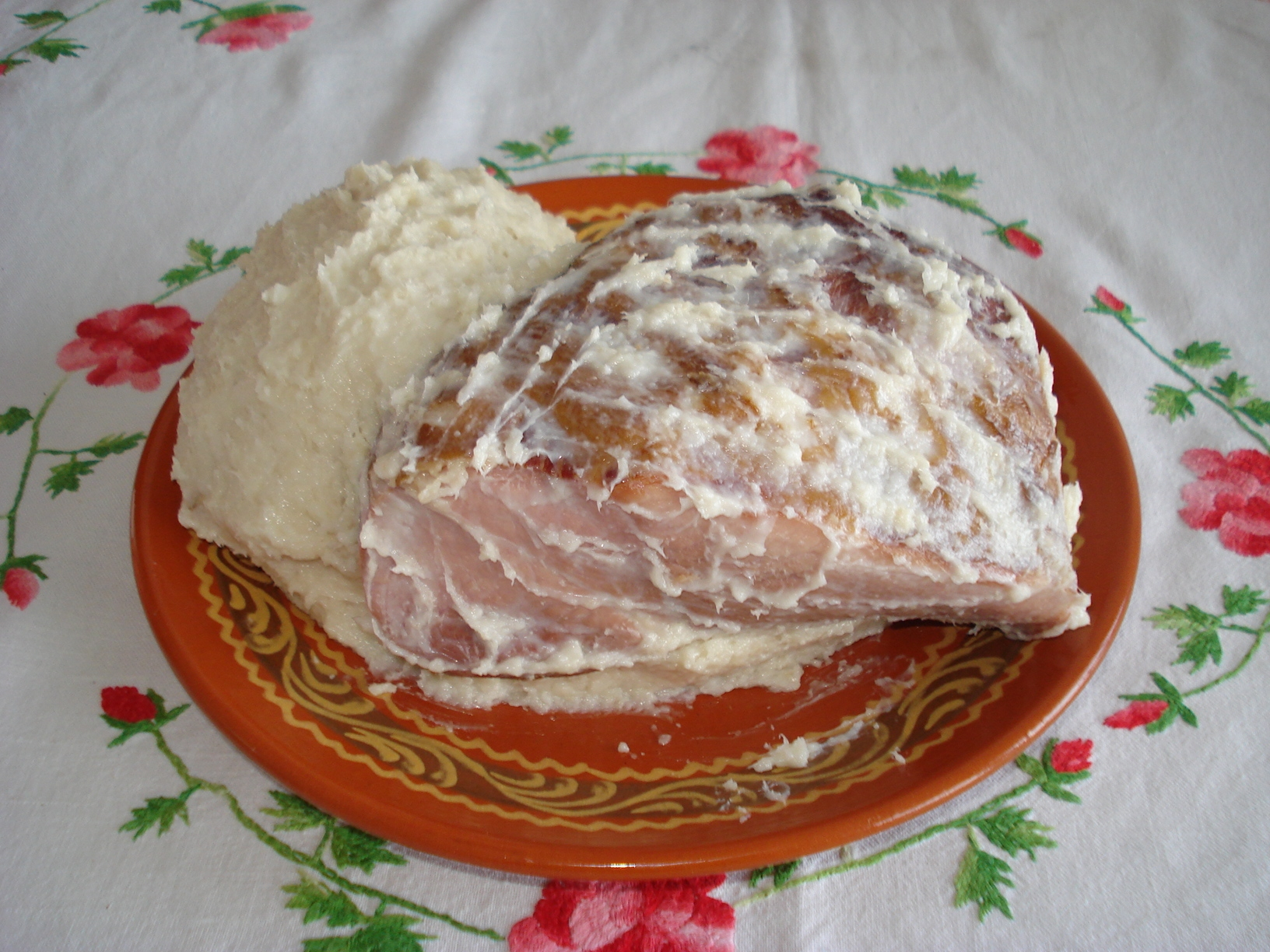
