= Fusi (pasta) =

Type of pasta

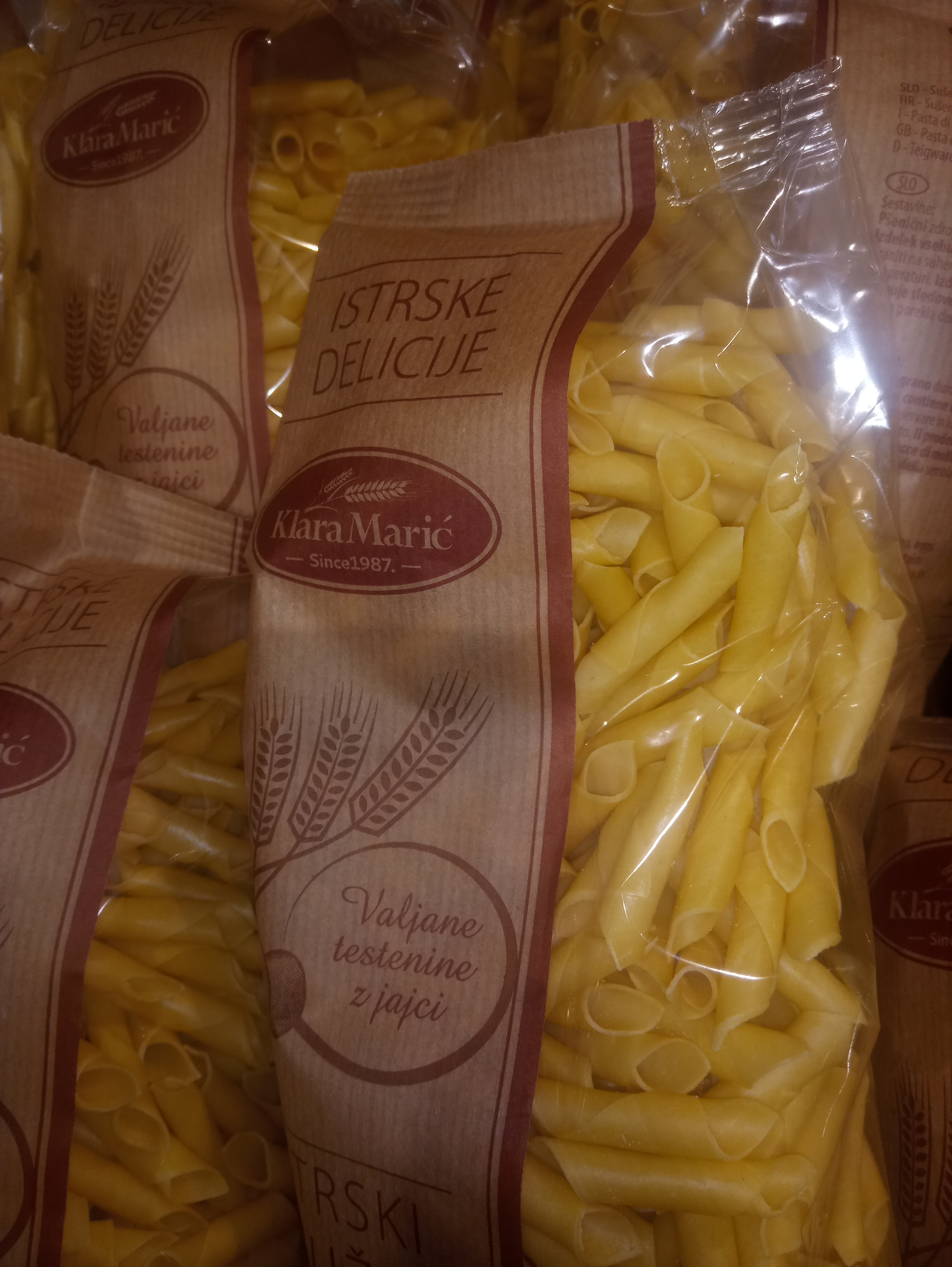
- Alternative names: Fuži
- Type: Pasta
- Region or state: Istria (Croatia
- Created by: traditional

Fusi (also Fuži in Croatian) is a traditional pasta of Istria region, in Croatia and Slovenia. The pasta dough is rolled out into a thin sheet, cut into strips three to four centimetres wide, and placed over each other. The strips are then cut diagonally, producing diamond shapes. Two ends of each diamond are then folded over each other to meet in the middle and pinched together, making the fusi look like a bow. It is usually served with a local version of goulash, a mild red veal sauce, which is usually made out of onions, tomato paste, white wine and broth. Common variations include rooster sauce or game sauce, such as boar or rabbit.

== See also ==
- Croatian cuisine
