= Paški baškotin =

Croatian zwieback rusk bread

- Type: Zwieback
- Place of origin: Croatia
- Region or state: Pag

Paški baškotin is an aromatic zwieback rusk bread from the island of Pag of Croatia.
