= Velebitsko =

Croatian beer brand

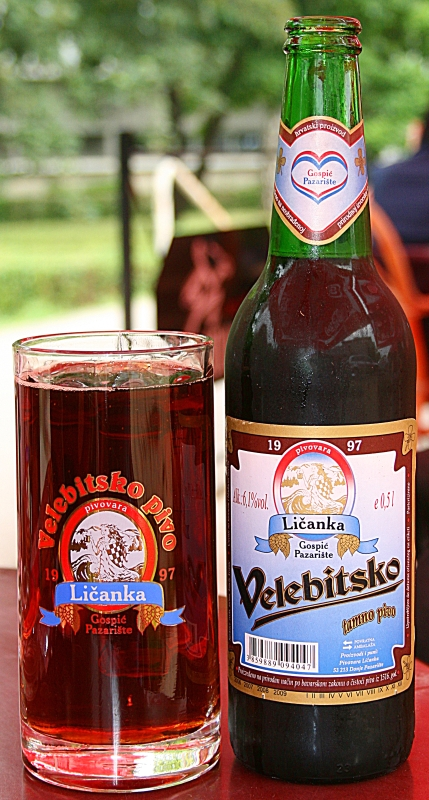

Velebitsko is a popular beer brand from Croatia, brewed near Gospić on the Velebit mountains in Lika by the Pivovara Ličanka. The name is used for the pale lager which has an alcohol content of 5.0% and for the dark lager which has an alcohol content of 6.0%. Known for its high quality brewery, the dark beer has been voted best beer by an English beer expert website. The beer is difficult to find in restaurants and stores in Croatia. One bar that serves it in Makarska is called Pivnica Pivac.
