= Podravina =

Historical, cultural and geographical region of Croatia and Slovenia

Coordinates: 46°34′5.36″N 15°36′2.26″E

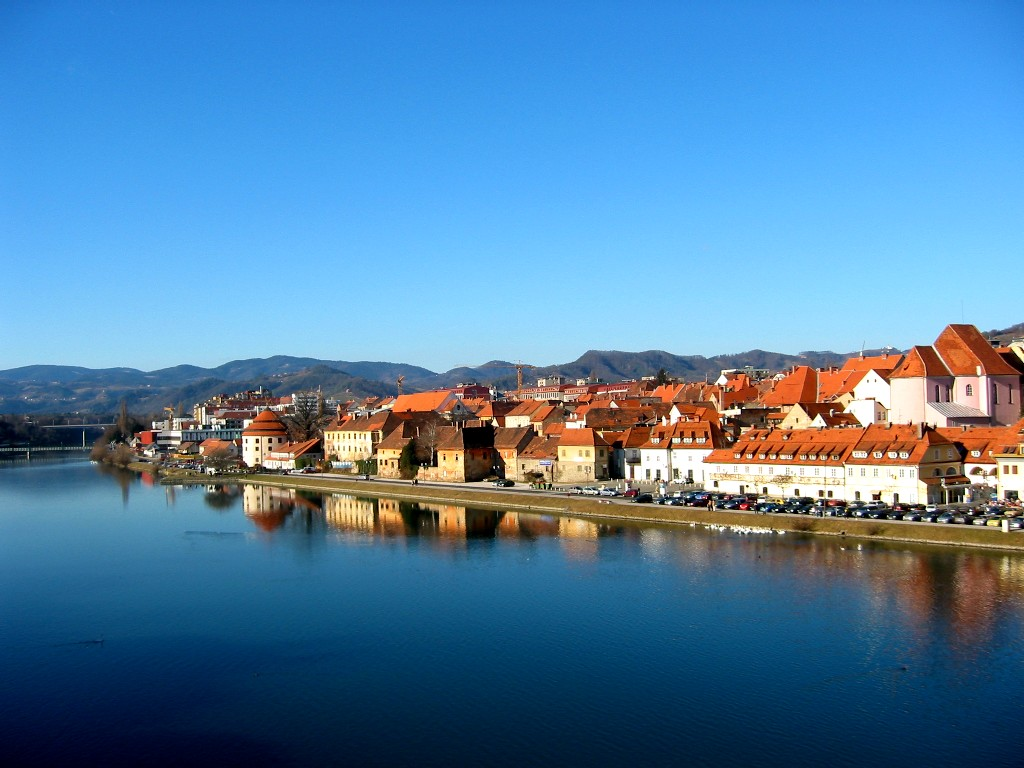
The Drava River at Maribor, Slovenia

Podravina (in Croatian) or Podravje (in Slovenian) are Slavic names for the Drava river basin in northern Croatia and Slovenia. Both names combine the hydronym with the South Slavic prefix "po-", meaning "alongside" or "after".

== History ==
Between 1929 and 1941, the area was mostly incorporated in one of the provinces of the Kingdom of Yugoslavia, the Drava Banovina (Banate of Drava.) The banate comprised most of present-day Slovenia, and shared its capital of Ljubljana.

One of the modern counties of Croatia is named Virovitica-Podravina; however, the unofficial capital of the Croatian Podravina region is the city of Koprivnica, the capital of Koprivnica-Križevci County.

== Major cities and towns along the river ==
Cities and towns in Slovenia:

- Dravograd
- Maribor
- Ptuj

Cities and towns in Croatia:

- Varaždin
- Koprivnica (Capital of Croatian Podravina)
- Đurđevac
- Virovitica
- Slatina
- Osijek

The state route D2 connects all Croatian towns in Podravina.

== See also ==
- Virovitica-Podravina County
- Koprivnica-Križevci County
- Varaždin County
- Drava Banovina

== Sources ==
- Podravina (in Croatian)
