= National dish =

Culinary dish strongly associated with a particular country

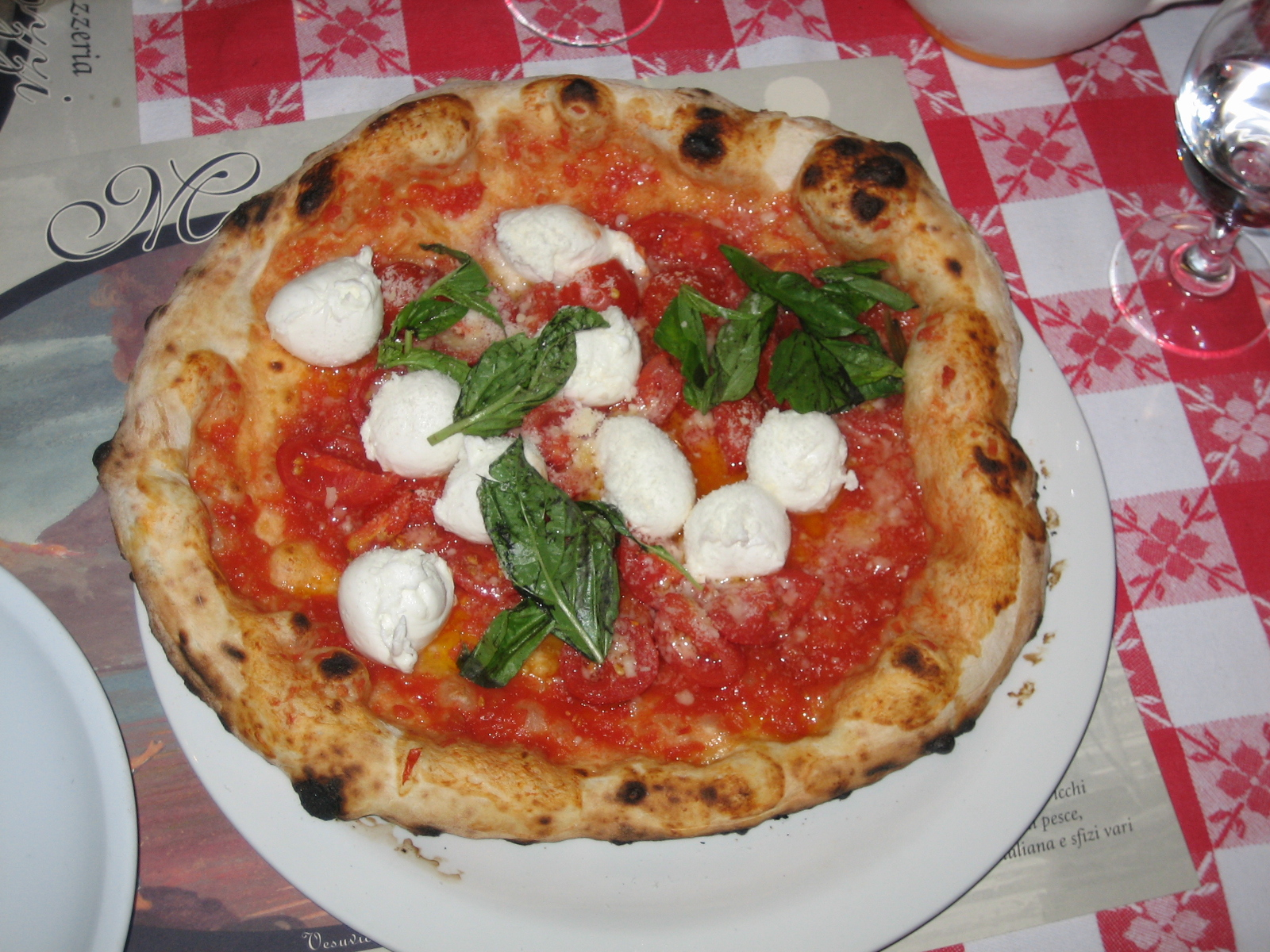
A type of pizza (pizza margherita).

A national dish is a culinary dish that is strongly associated with a particular country. A dish can be considered a national dish for a variety of reasons:

- It is a staple food, made from a selection of locally available foodstuffs that can be prepared in a distinctive way, such as fruits de mer, served along the west coast of France.
- It contains a particular ingredient that is produced locally, such as a paprika grown in the European Pyrenees.
- It is served as a festive culinary tradition that forms part of a cultural heritage—for example, barbecues at summer camp or fondue at dinner parties—or as part of a religious practice, such as Korban Pesach or Iftar celebrations.
- It has been promoted as a national dish, by the country itself, such as the promotion of fondue as a national dish of Switzerland by the Swiss Cheese Union (Schweizerische Käseunion) in the 1930s.

National dishes are part of a nation's identity and self-image. For example, pizza is considered one of the national dishes of Italy and its variants are among the most popular foods in the world. During the age of European empire-building, nations would develop a national cuisine to distinguish themselves from their rivals.

Some countries such as Mexico, China or India, because of their diverse ethnic populations, cultures, and cuisines, do not have a single national dish, even unofficially. Furthermore, because national dishes are so interwoven into a nation's sense of identity, strong emotions and conflicts can arise when trying to choose a country's national dish.

== By country ==
This is not a definitive list of national dishes, but rather a list of some foods that have been suggested to be national dishes.

=== A ===
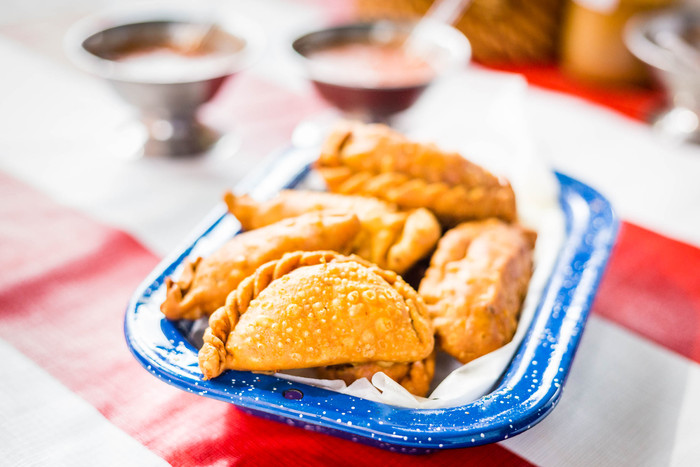
Argentine empanadas

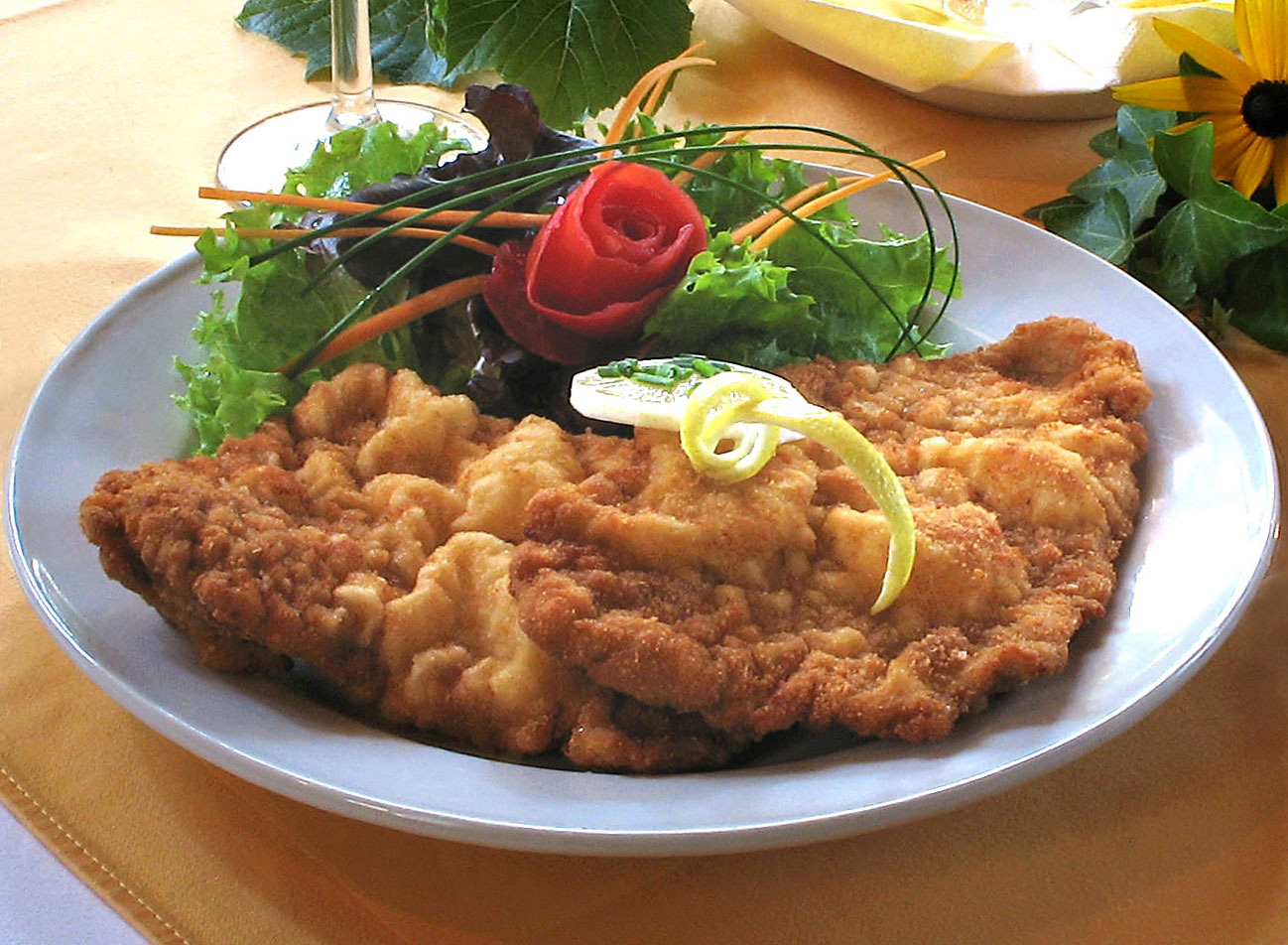
Austrian wiener schnitzel

- Afghanistan: kabuli palaw
- Albania: tavë kosi, flia
- Algeria: couscous, rechta
- Andorra: escudella i carn d'olla
- Angola: moamba de galinha
- Antigua and Barbuda: fungee and pepperpot
- Argentina: asado, empanada, matambre, locro
- Armenia: khorovats, harisa (not to be confused with the North African pepper paste harissa)
- Aruba: Keshi yena
- Australia: roast lamb, meat pie, Vegemite on toast
- Austria: Wiener schnitzel
- Azerbaijan: dolma

=== B ===
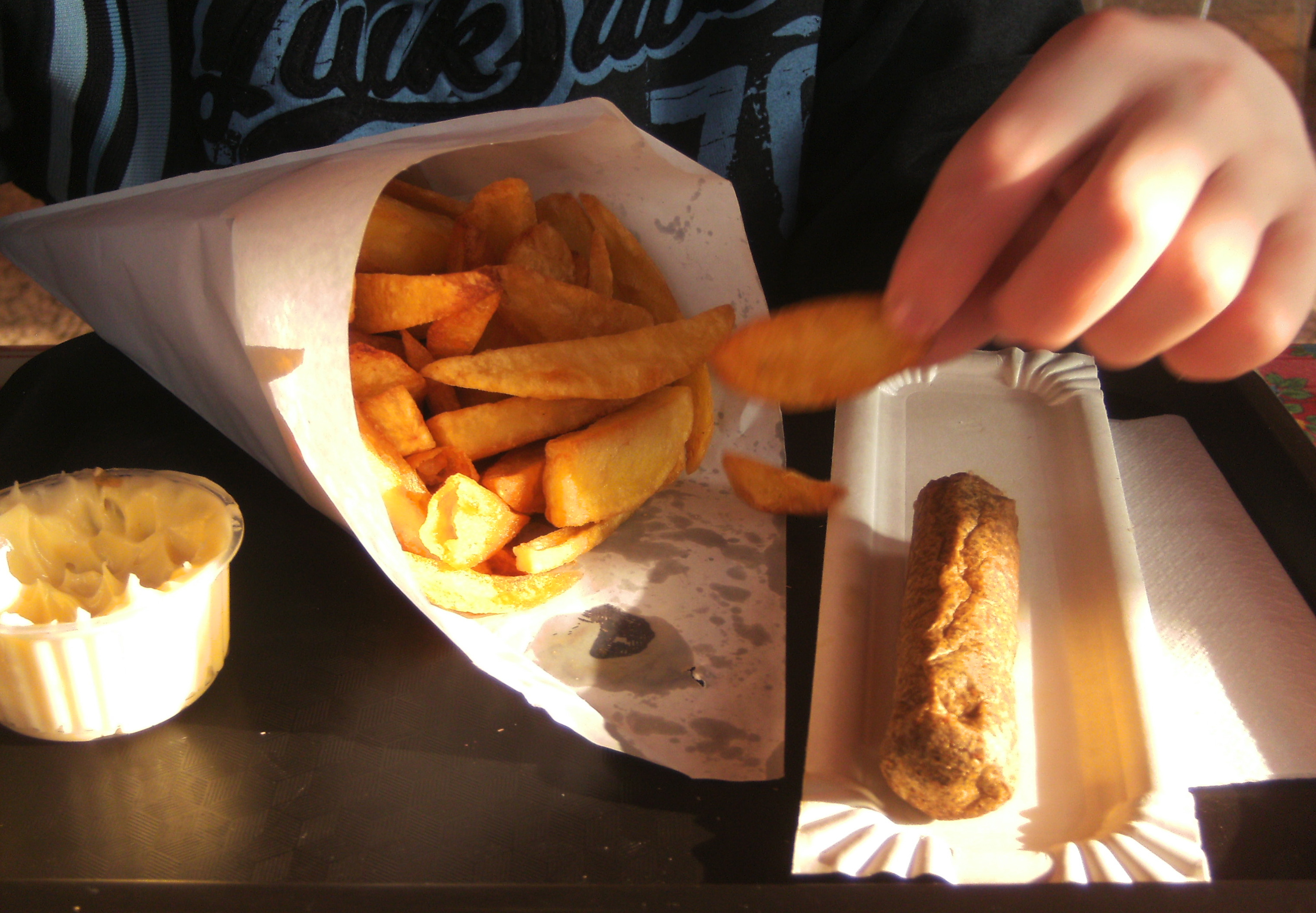
Belgian frites with mayonnaise

- Bahamas: crack conch with peas and rice
- Bahrain: kabsa
- Bangladesh: rice and fish (particularly ilish)
- Barbados: cou-cou and flying fish
- Belarus: draniki
- Belgium: frites (particularly served with mussels or steak), carbonade flamande, waterzooi, chocolate mousse, Belgian waffle
- Belize: rice and beans
- Benin: kuli-kuli
- Bhutan: ema datshi
- Bolivia: salteñas
- Bosnia and Herzegovina: Bosnian pot, ćevapi, burek
- Botswana: seswaa
- Brazil: feijoada, churrasco
- Brunei: ambuyat
- Bulgaria: Shopska salad, banitsa
- Burkina Faso: riz gras
- Burundi: boko boko

=== C ===
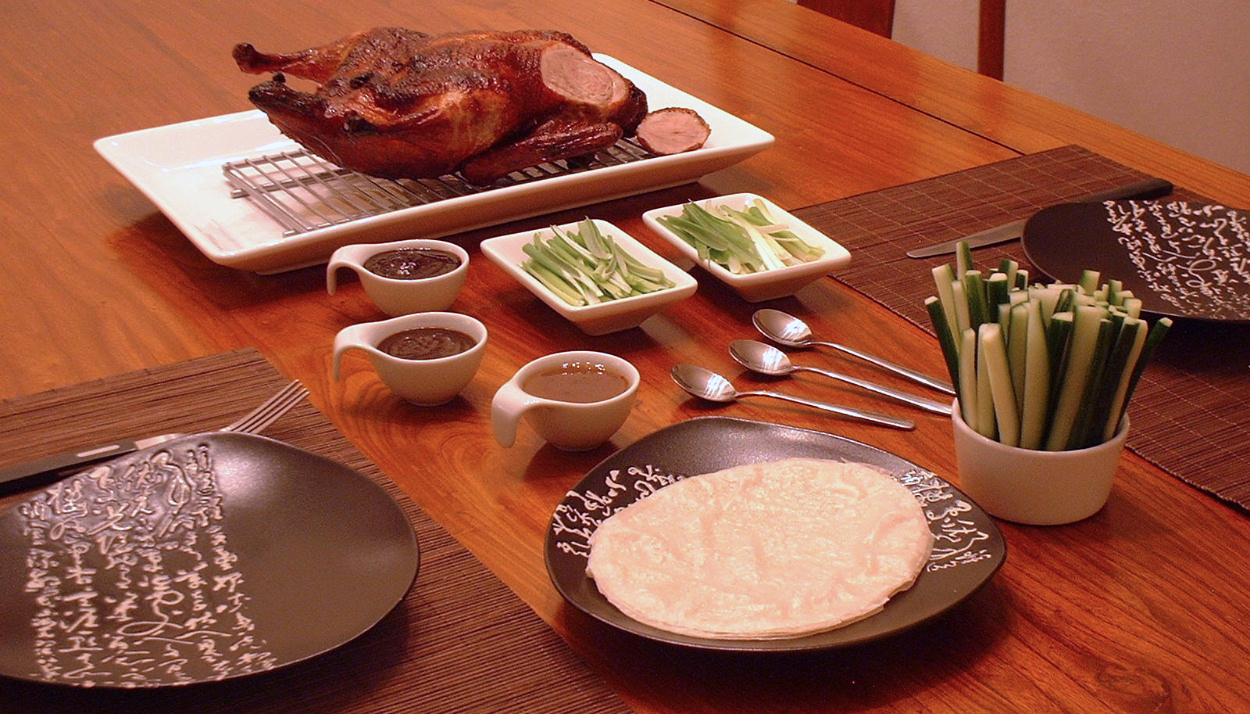
Peking duck, China

- Cambodia: fish amok, num banhchok, samlar kako
- Cameroon: ndolé
- Canada: poutine, donair, butter tarts, Nanaimo bar, tourtière
- Cape Verde: cachupa
- Central African Republic: cassava
- Chad: boule
- Chile: empanada, pastel de choclo, marraqueta
- China: Peking duck, crayfish, hot pot, dumpling, malaxiangguo, dim sum, kaolengmian, tanghulu
- Colombia: ajiaco, bandeja paisa
- Comoros: Langouste a la vanille (vanilla lobster)
- Democratic Republic of the Congo: poulet à la moambé
- Republic of the Congo: poulet moambé
- Costa Rica: casado, chifrijo (chicharrón or deep fried seasoned pork pieces served with beans, usually red or black beans), white rice and pico de gallo (it may be served with avocado and/or corn chips), gallo pinto, olla de carne (stewed beef soup with a variety of vegetables).
- Croatia: zagorski štrukli, pašticada, sinjski arambaši, soparnik, rapska torta, imotska torta, rafioli, jota
- Cuba: ropa vieja
- Cyprus: souvla, kleftiko, trachanás
- Czech Republic: vepřo knedlo zelo (roast pork with dumplings and sauerkraut), svíčková, paštika

=== D ===
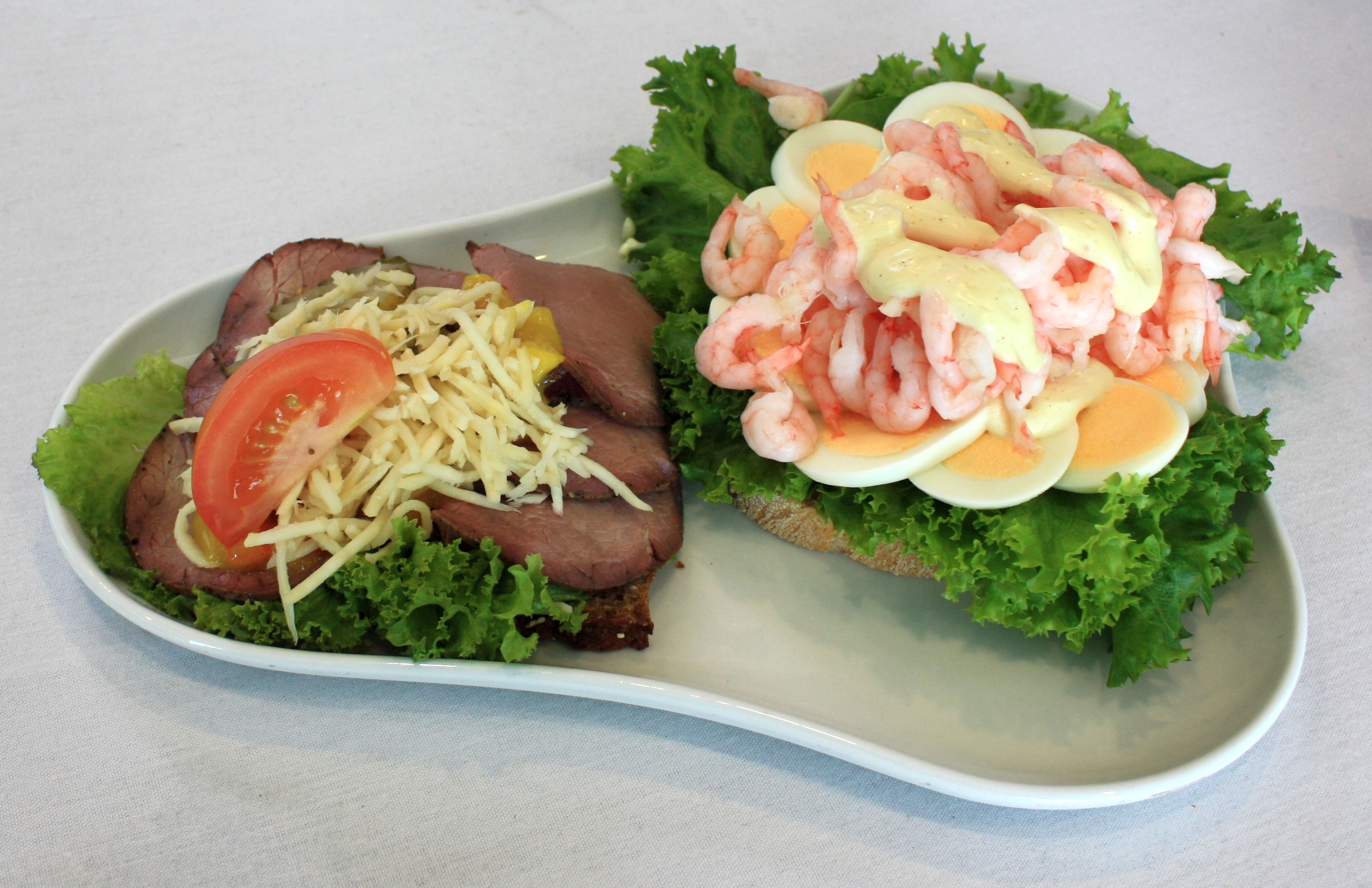
Danish smørrebrød

- Denmark: stegt flæsk, smørrebrød, flæskesteg
  - Faroe Islands: Skerpikjøt
  - Greenland: suaasat
- Djibouti: skoudehkaris
- Dominica: mountain chicken (historical), callaloo
- Dominican Republic: La bandera (rice, beans and meat)

=== E ===
- Ecuador: encebollado, guatitas, fanesca
- Egypt: ful medames, kushari, molokhiya, taʿamiya
- El Salvador: pupusa
- Equatorial Guinea: Succotash
- Eritrea: zigini with injera
- Estonia: kama
- Eswatini: Shisa Nyama
- Ethiopia: doro wat with injera

=== F ===
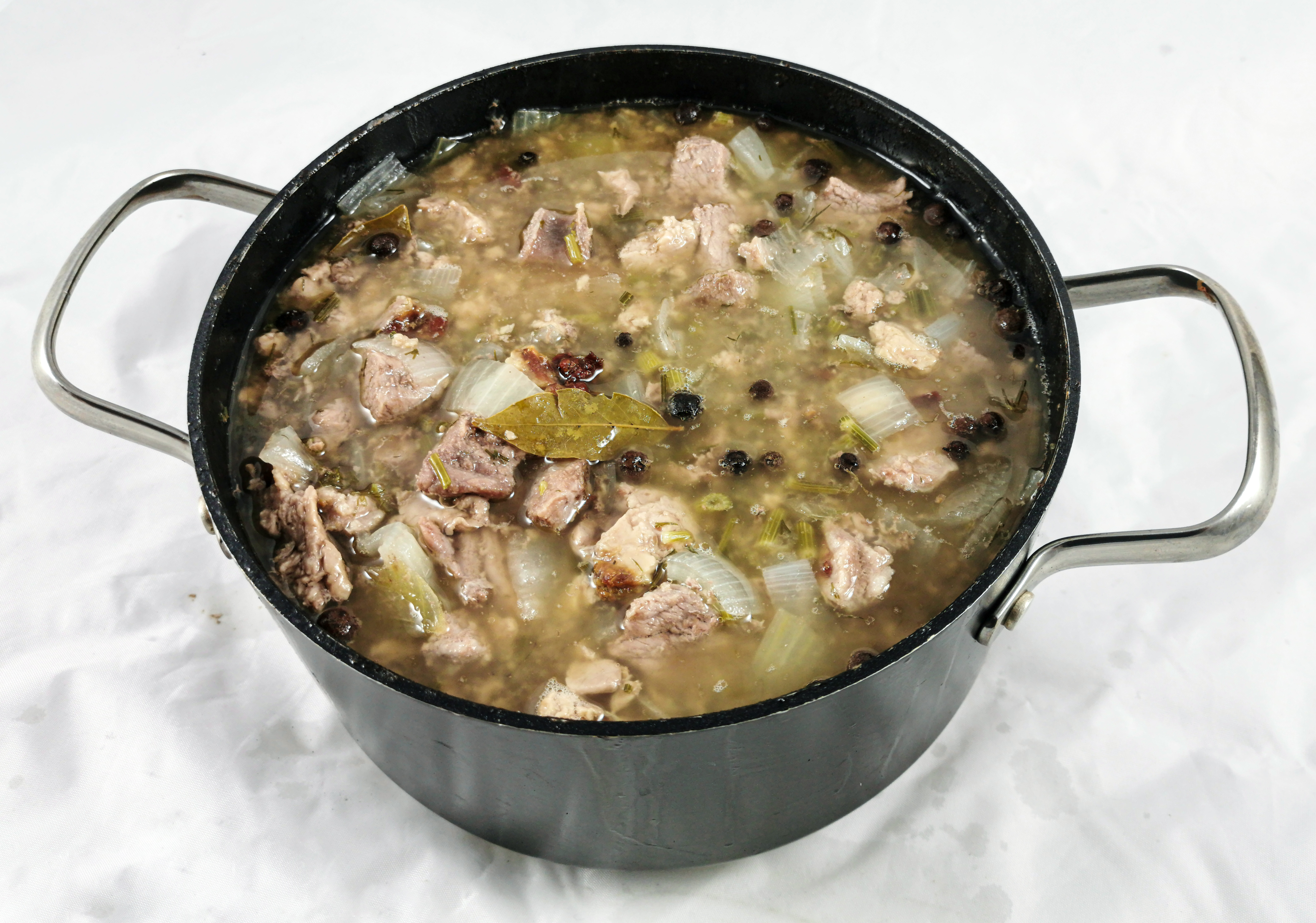
Finnish Karjalanpaisti (Karelian hot pot)

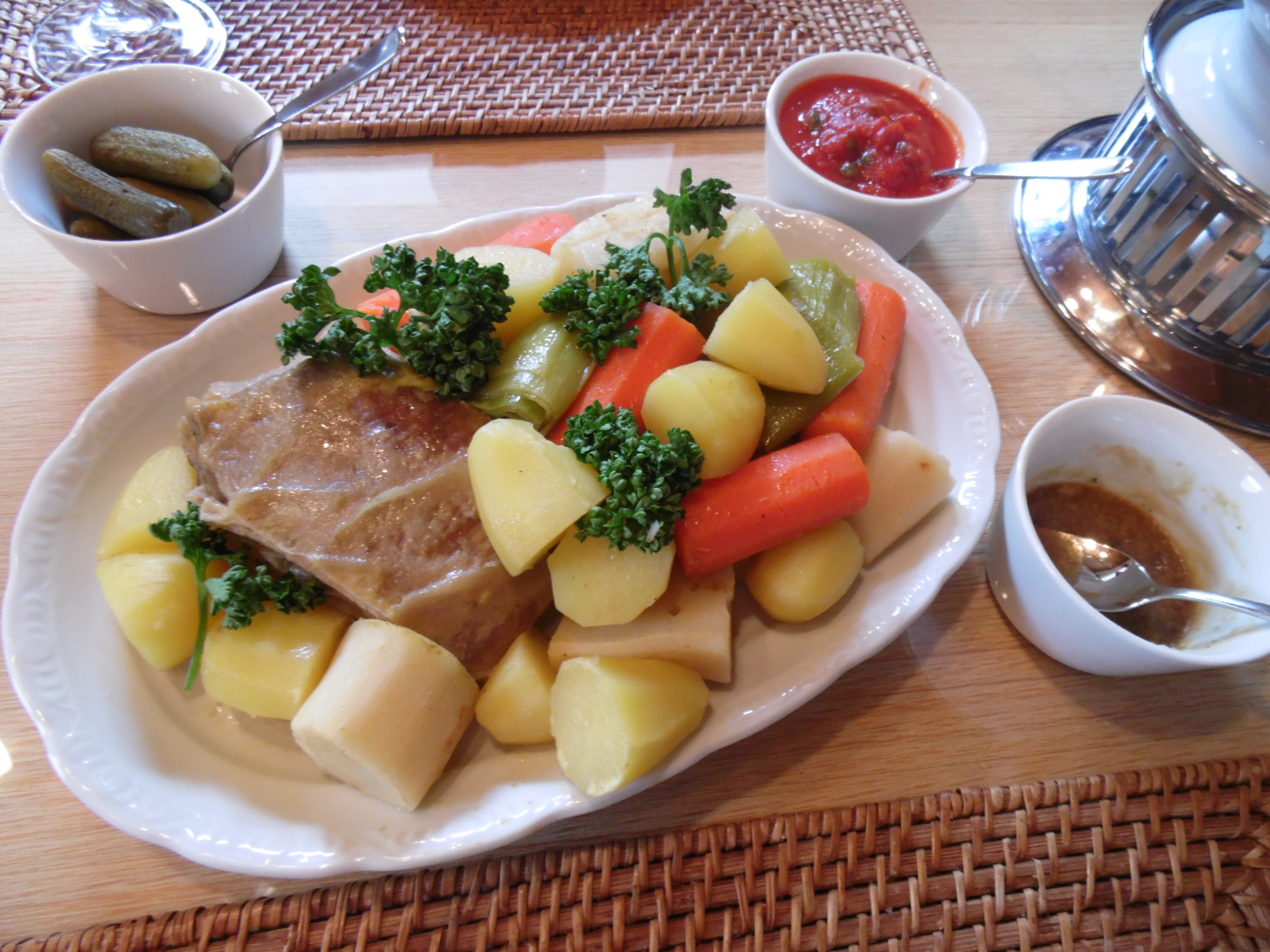
Pot-au-feu, national dish of France

- Fiji: kokoda (Fijian ceviche)
- Finland: rye bread, Karelian pie, karjalanpaisti, lohikeitto, joulutorttu
- France: escargot, pot-au-feu, beef bourguignon, blanquette de veau, steak frites, baguette, cassoulet, cheese, crêpe, crème caramel, croissant, poule au pot (historical), chou à la crème

=== G ===
- Gabon: poulet nyembwe
- The Gambia: domoda
- Georgia: khachapuri, khinkali
- Germany: schweinshaxe, bratwurst, sauerbraten, döner kebab, currywurst, eisbein with sauerkraut
- Ghana: fufu, jollof rice
- Greece: horiatiki, moussaka, fasolada souvlaki, gyros, magiritsa, kokoretsi
- Grenada: oil down
- Guatemala: pepián
- Guinea: poulet yassa
- Guinea-Bissau: caldo de mancarra
- Guyana: pepperpot and chicken curry

=== H ===
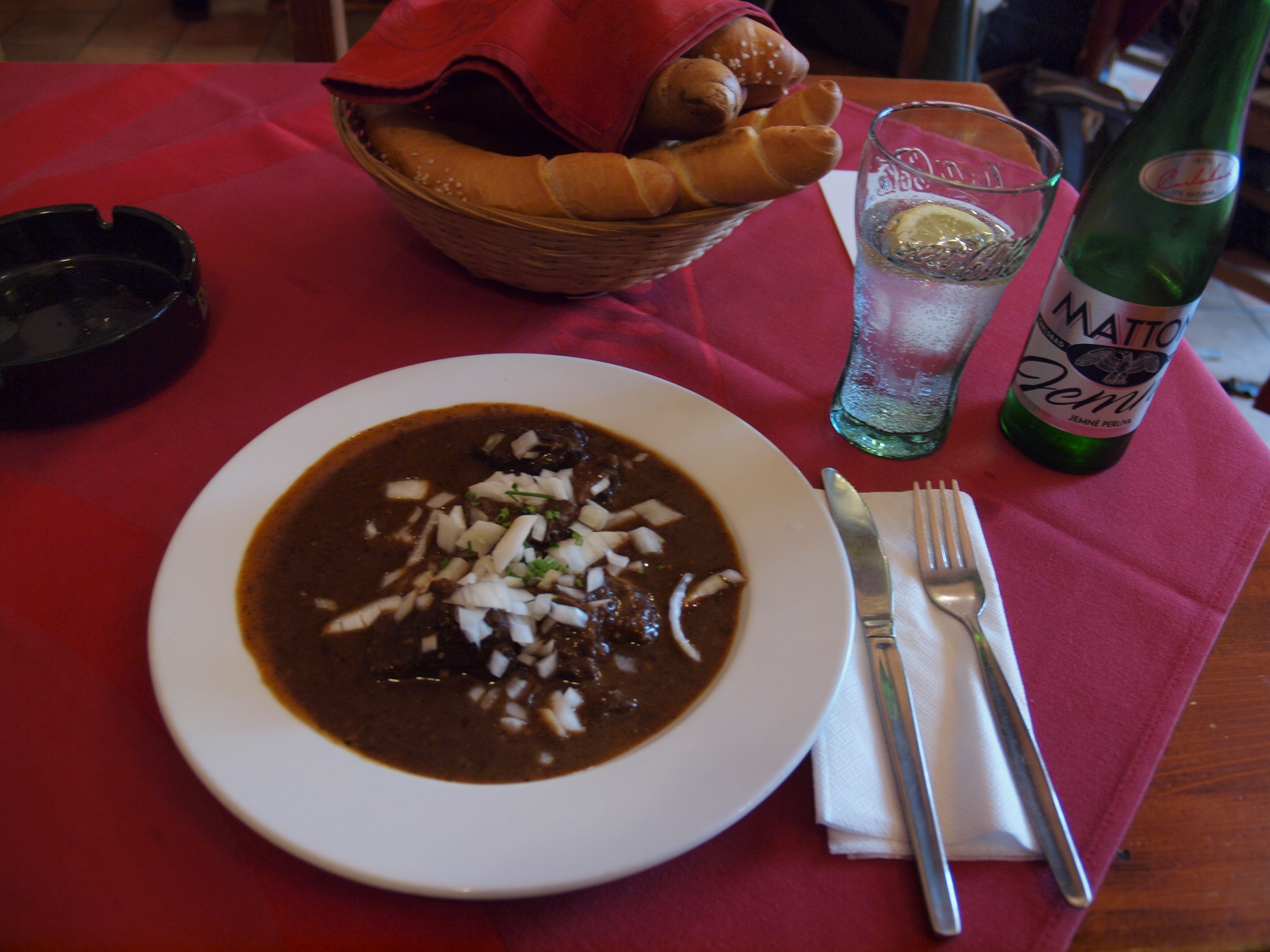
Hungarian goulash

- Haiti: griot, soup joumou
- Honduras: baleada
- Hong Kong: pineapple bun, dim sum
- Hungary: goulash

=== I ===
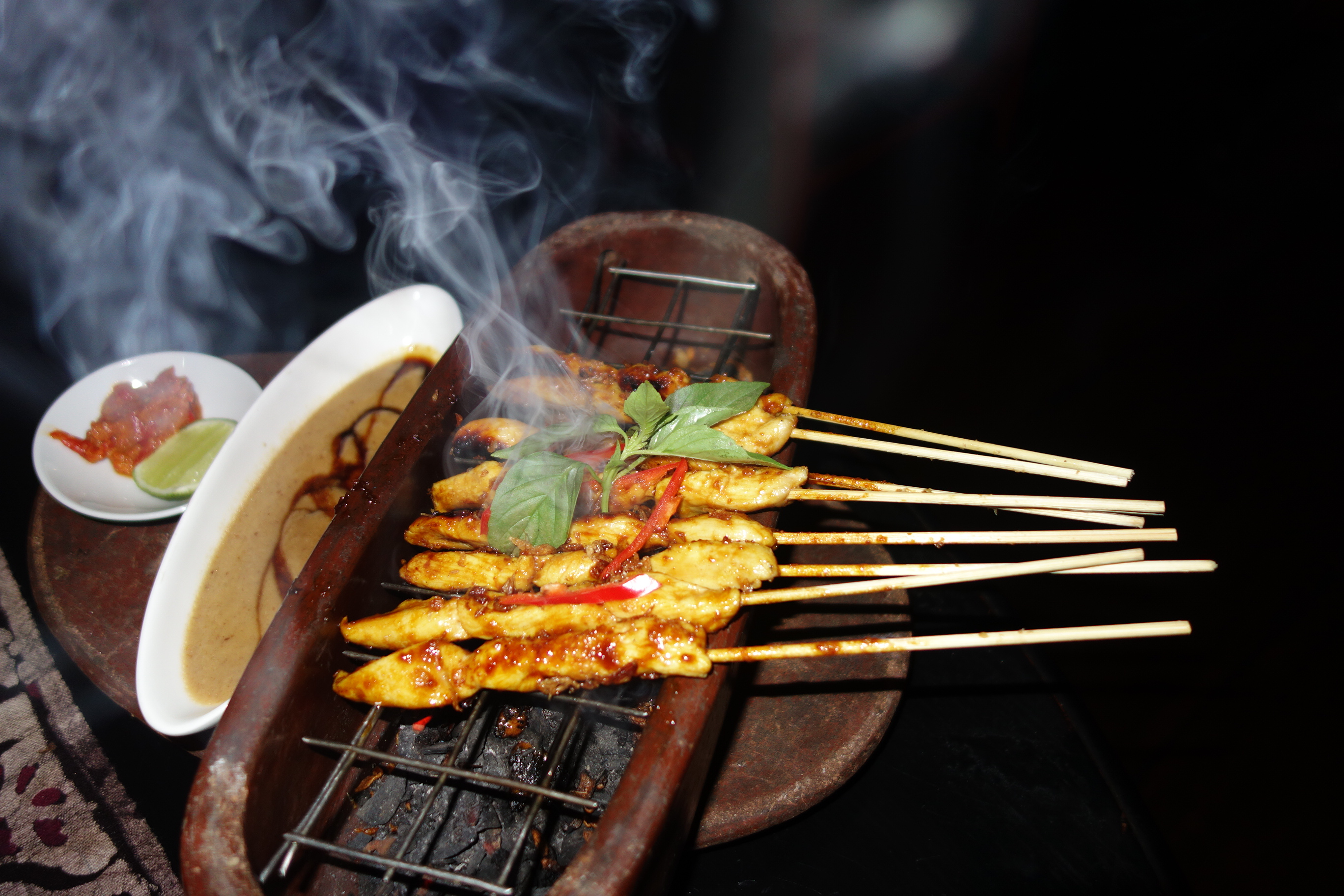
Satay, one of the national dishes of Indonesia

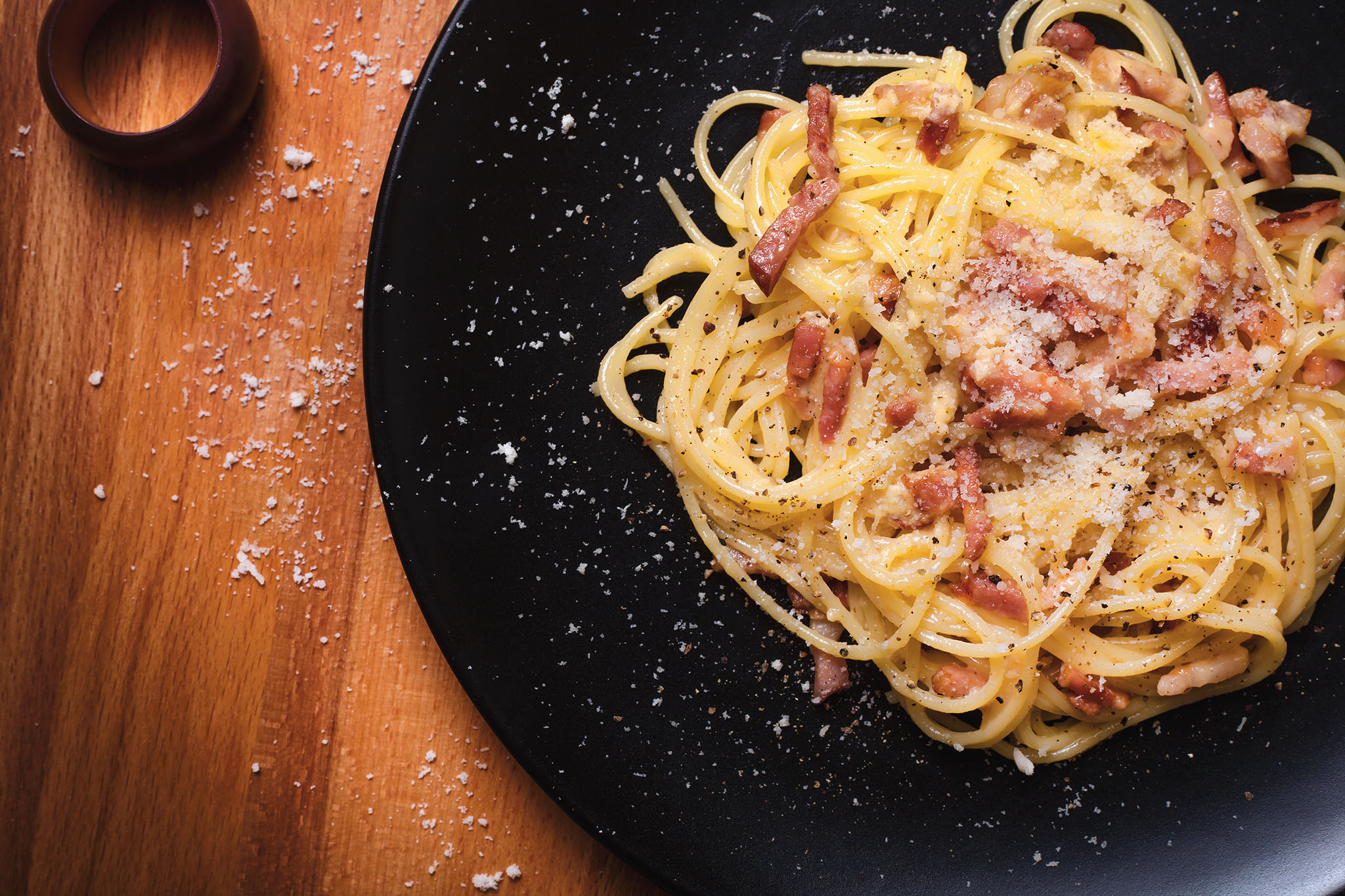
A dish of pasta (carbonara). Pasta is considered one of the national dishes of Italy

- Iceland: lamb, hákarl
- India: Khichdi, Chaat, butter chicken, biryani, Dal, dosa, idli
- Indonesia: nasi goreng, mie goreng, tumpeng, satay, soto, rendang, gado gado
- Iran: abgoosht, chelo kabab, ghormeh sabzi Fesenjan
- Iraq: masgouf, dolma, Iraqi kebab, quzi
- Ireland: soda bread, butter, Irish stew
- Israel: falafel (served in pita), Israeli salad, meorav Yerushalmi, sabich, Ptitim
- Italy: pasta, pizza, risotto, mozzarella, Parmigiano Reggiano, Italian wine
- Ivory Coast: atcheke

=== J ===
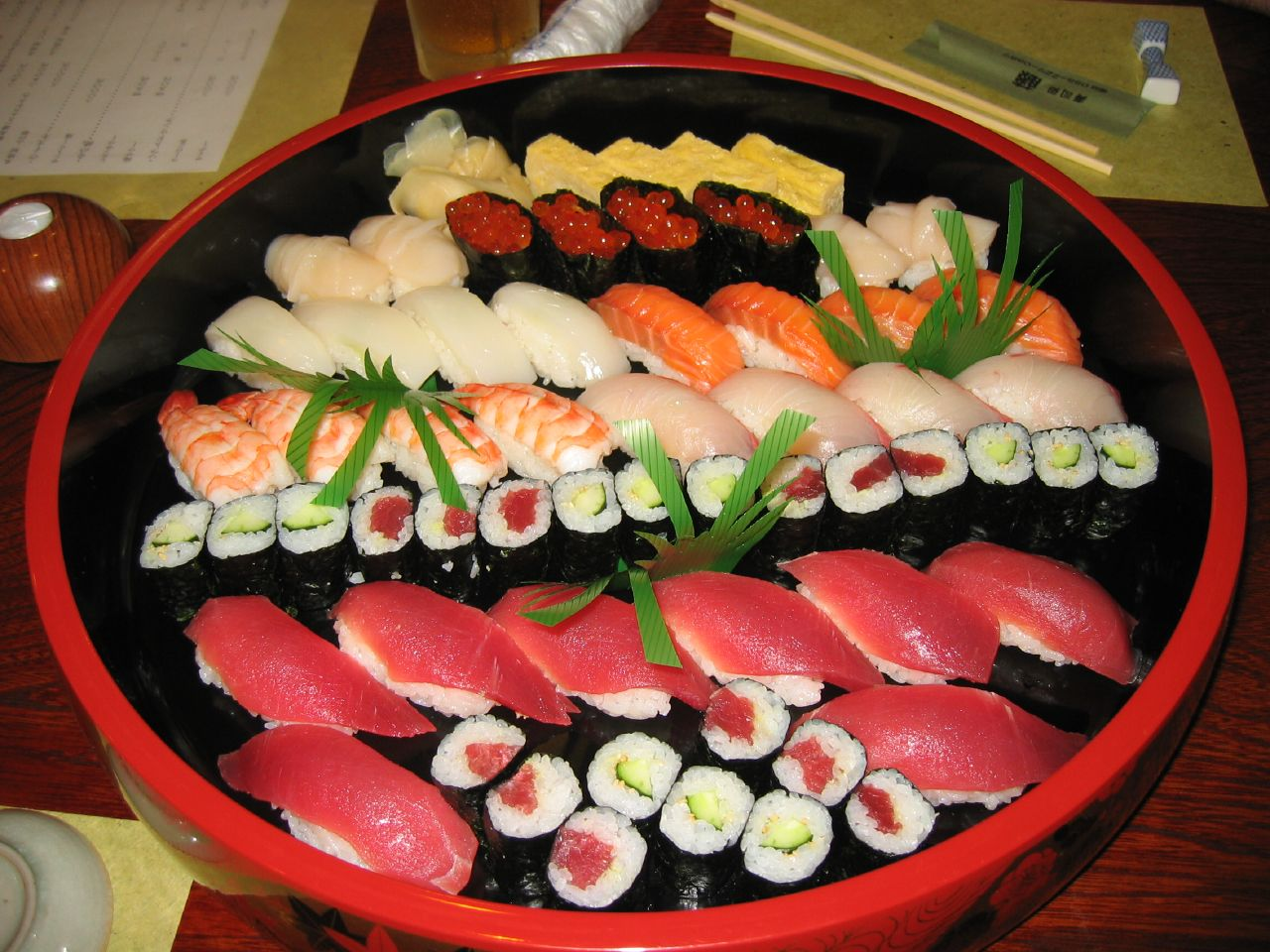
Sushi, Japan

- Jamaica: Ackee and saltfish
- Japan: sushi, sashimi, Japanese curry, ramen, tempura, wagashi, miso soup
- Jordan: mansaf

=== K ===
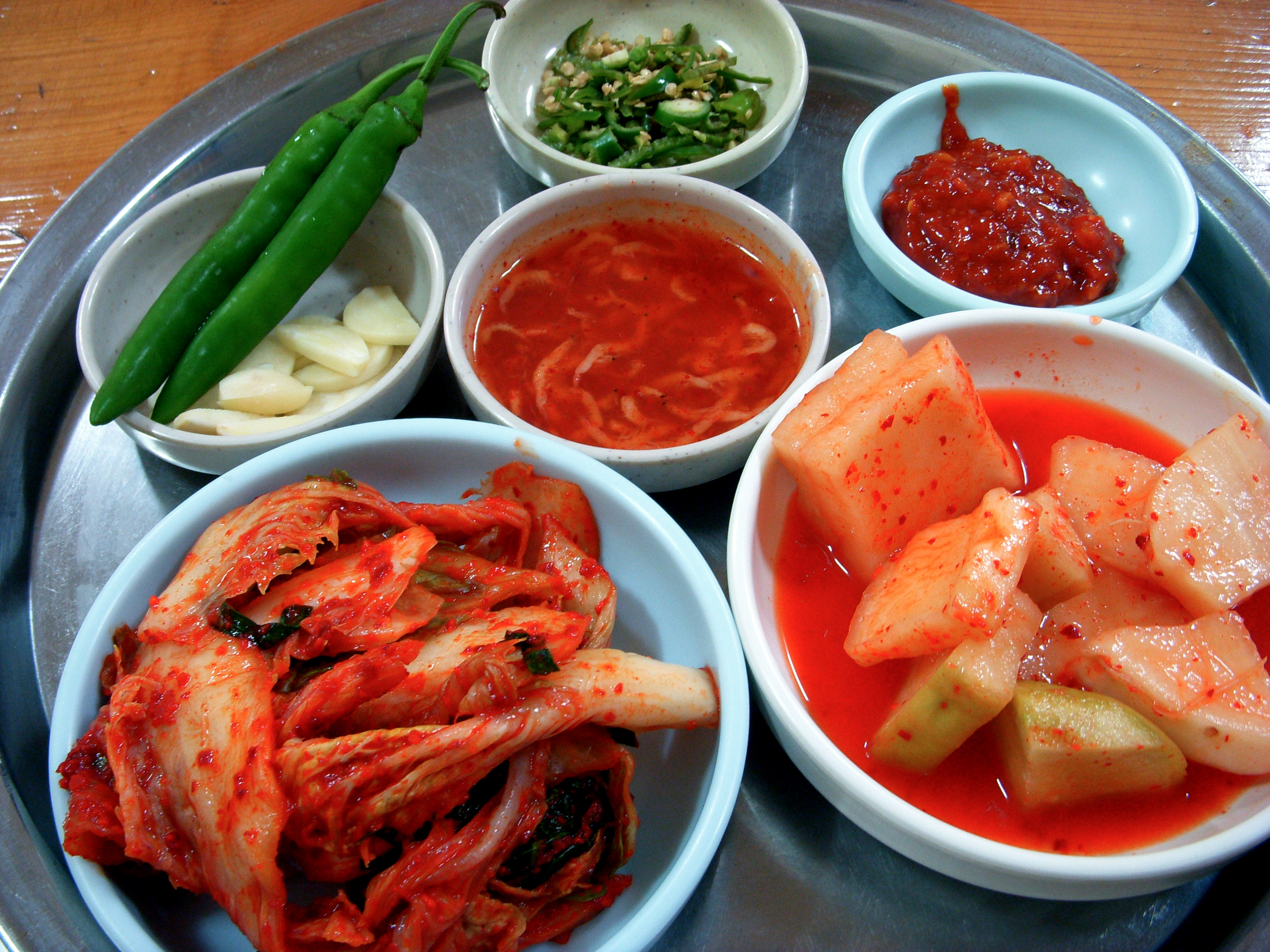
Korean kimchi

- Kazakhstan: beshbarmak
- Kenya: ugali with sukuma wiki, githeri, chapati, nyama choma
- Kiribati: Palusami
- Korea, North: raengmyŏn, kimchi
- Korea, South: kimchi, bulgogi, bibimbap, jajangmyeon, bingsu, tteokbokki
- Kosovo: flia
- Kuwait: Machboos Laham
- Kyrgyzstan: beshbarmak

=== L ===
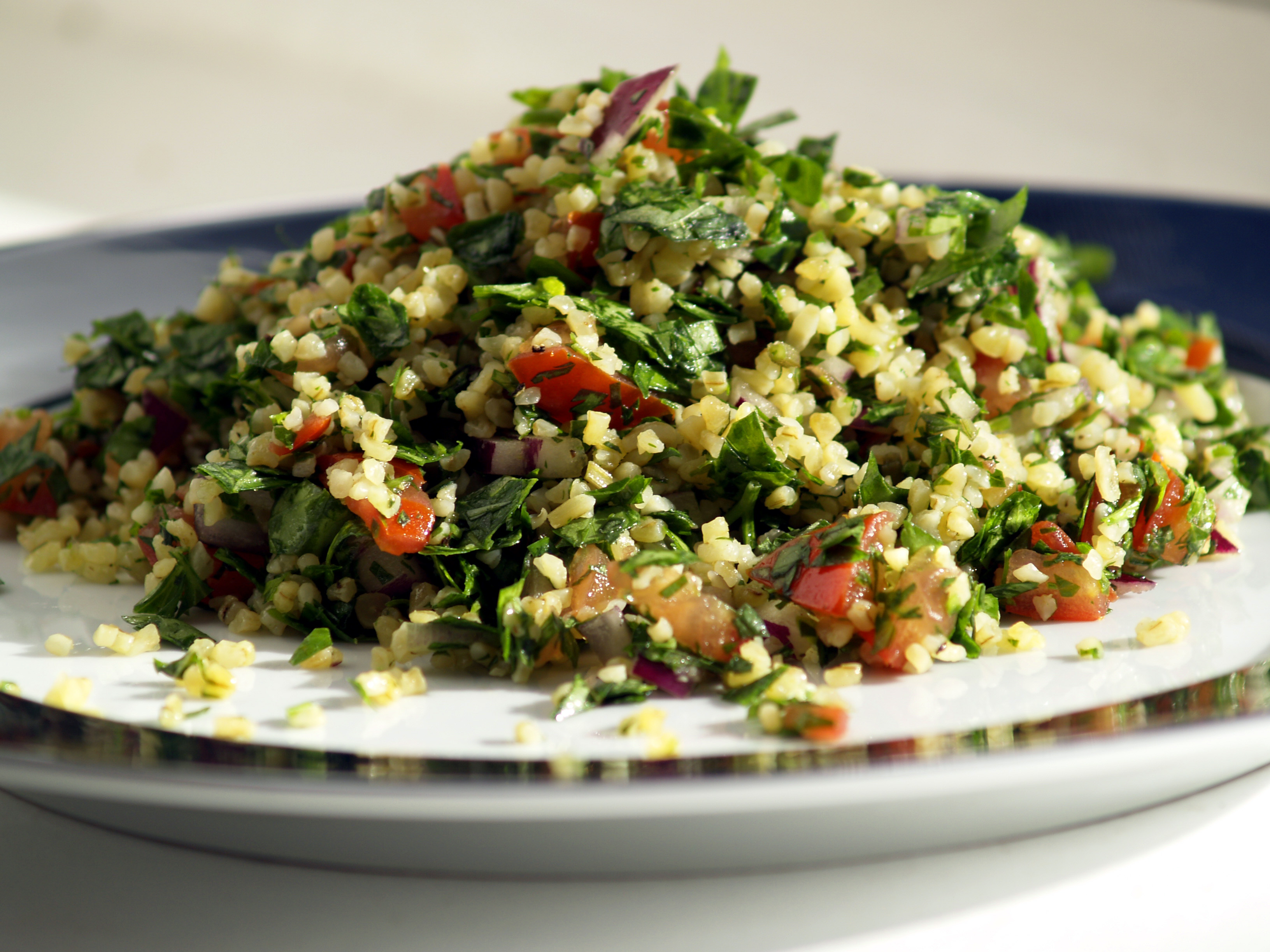
Tabbouleh, Lebanon

- Laos: larb/laap, sticky rice, tam mak hoong
- Latvia: layered rye bread, sklandrausis, Jāņi cheese, Grey peas
- Lebanon: kibbeh, tabbouleh
- Lesotho: Pap-pap
- Liberia: dumboy
- Libya: Couscous
- Liechtenstein: käsknöpfle
- Lithuania: bigos, cepelinai, šaltibarščiai
- Luxembourg: Judd mat Gaardebounen

=== M ===
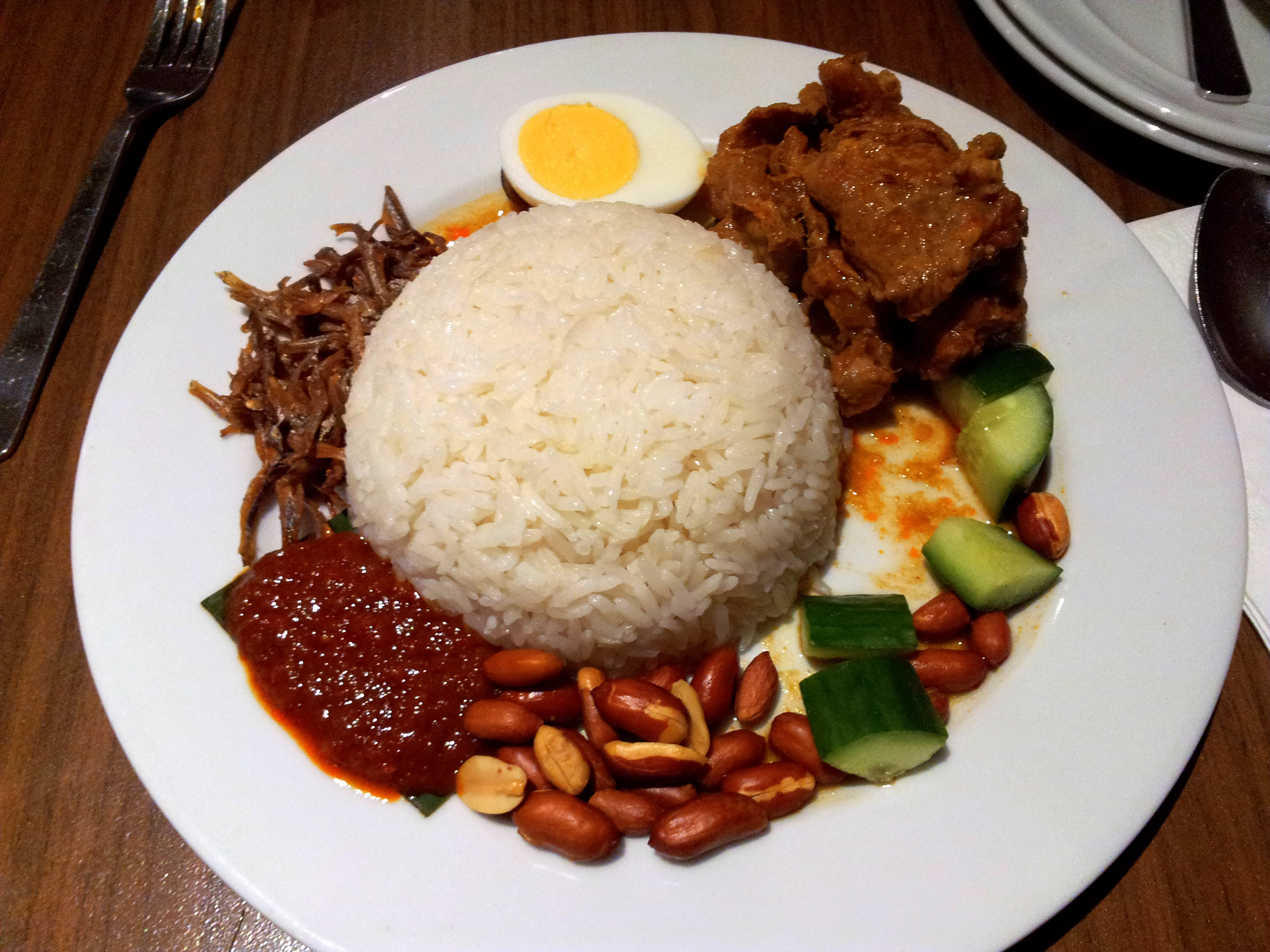
Nasi lemak, a national dish of Malaysia.

- Madagascar: romazava
- Malaysia: nasi lemak, satay
- Maldives: mas huni
- Mali: tiguadege na
- Malta: stuffat tal-fenek
- Marshall Islands: Barramundi cod
- Mauritius: dholl puri (flatbread stuffed with lentils)
- Mexico: taco, mole poblano, chiles en nogada
- Moldova: mămăligă, ghivetch
- Monaco: barbagiuan
- Mongolia: buuz
- Montenegro: njeguški pršut
- Morocco: couscous, tagine
- Myanmar: mohinga, lahpet thoke

=== N ===
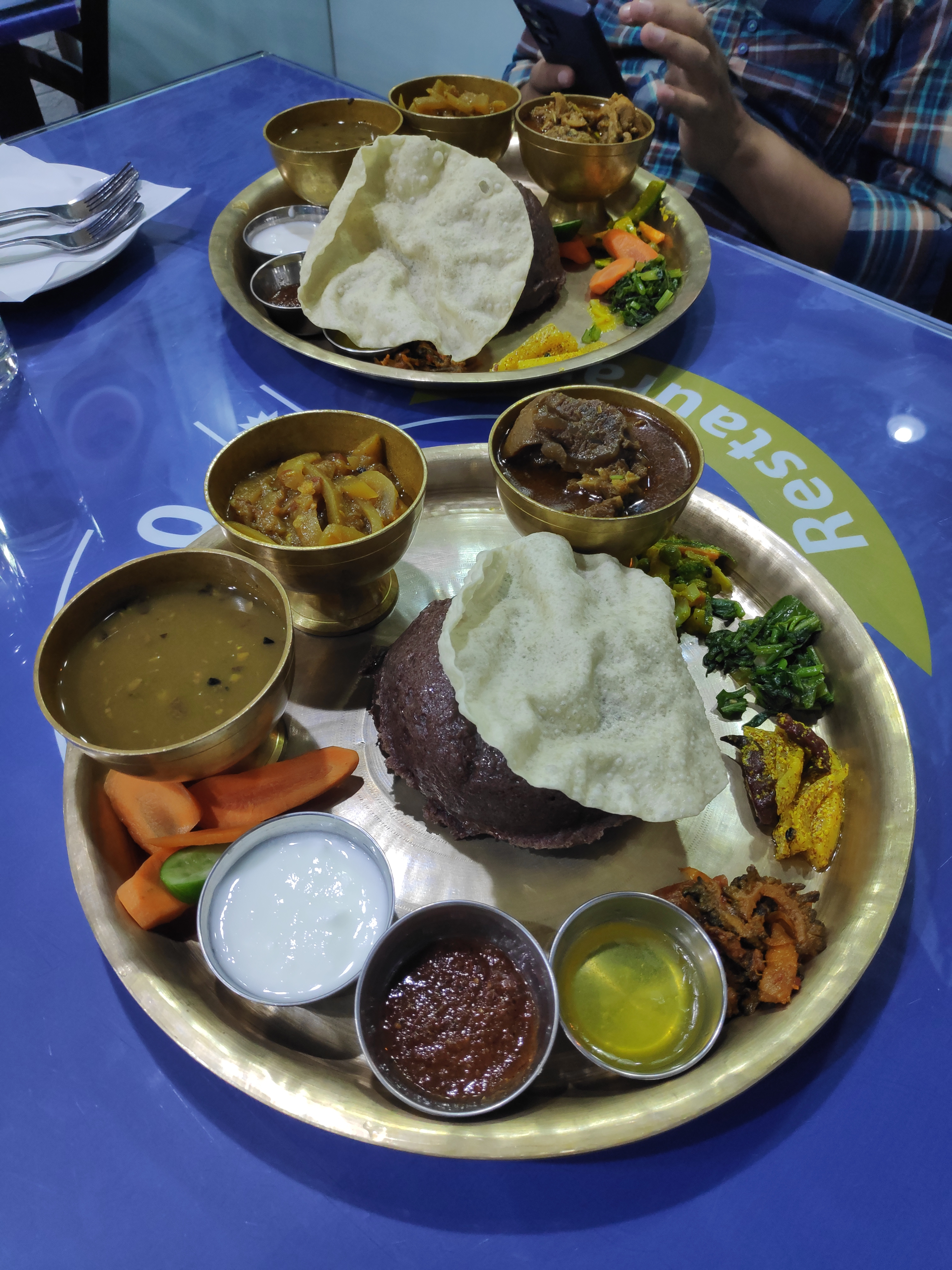
Dhido, Nepal

- Nauru: coconut fish
- Nepal: Gundruk and Dhido
- Netherlands: stamppot, soused herring with onion and pickles
- New Zealand: meat pie, bacon and egg pie, lamb, pavlova
- Nicaragua: gallo pinto, nacatamal, vigorón
- Niger: dambou
- Nigeria: tuwon shinkafa, Jollof rice, pounded yam and egusi soup, Indomie instant noodles
- North Macedonia: tavče gravče
- Norway: fårikål

=== O ===
- Oman: shuwa

=== P ===
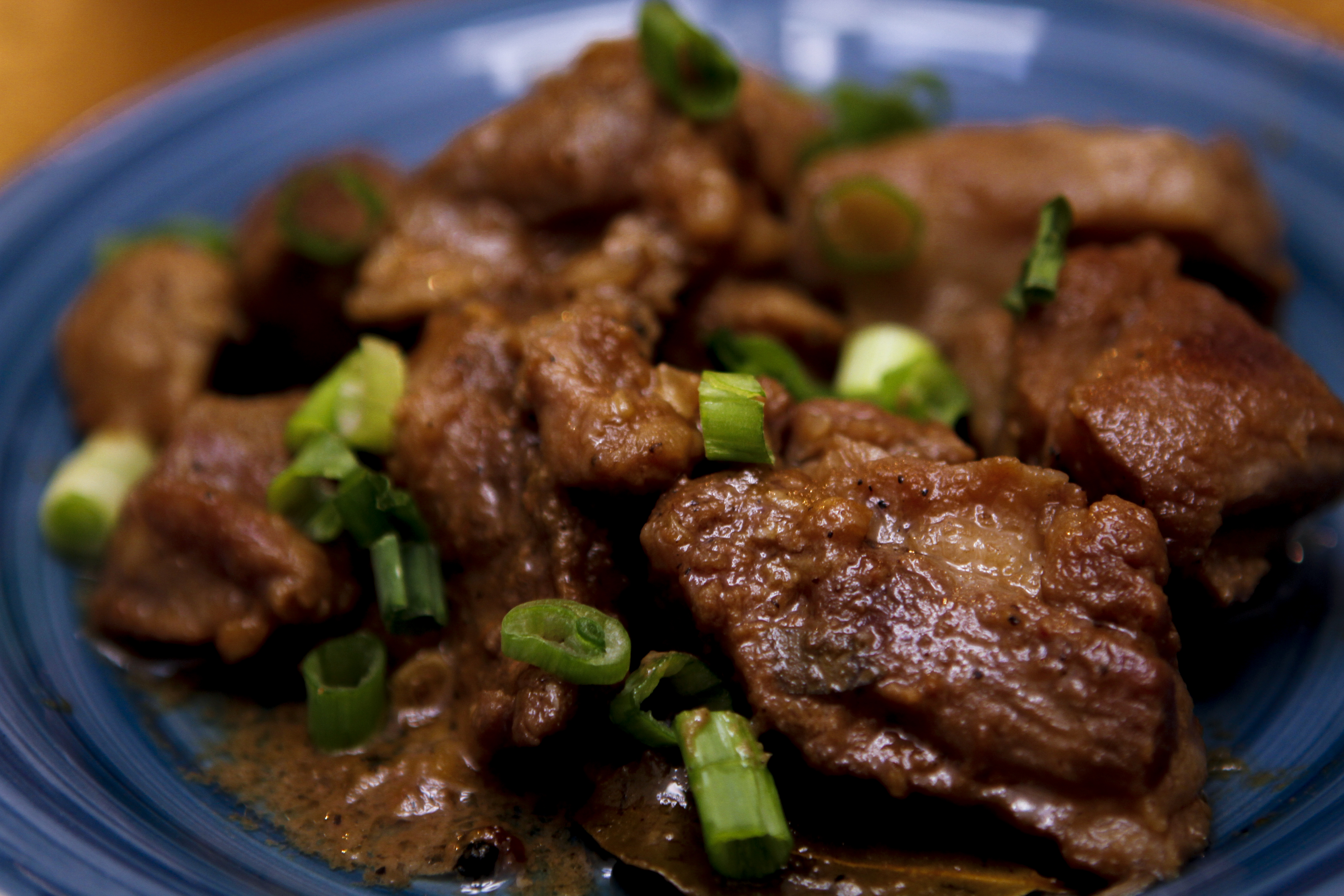
Philippine adobo, a national dish of the Philippines

- Pakistan: biryani, nihari, chicken karahi, gulab jamun
- Palestine: maqluba, musakhan, falafel
- Panama: sancocho
- Paraguay: Sopa paraguaya
- Peru: ceviche, pollo a la brasa
- Philippines: adobo, sinigang, sisig, pancit, halo-halo, lechon
- Poland: bigos, pierogi, kotlet schabowy,
- Portugal: bacalhau, caldo verde, cozido à portuguesa, Pastel de Belem, Sardinha Assada (Grilled Sardines)

=== Q ===
- Qatar: machboos

=== R ===
- Romania: mămăligă, sarmale, mici
- Russia: beef stroganoff, chicken Kiev, pierogi, borscht, shchi, Kasha, pelmeni, pirozhki, Olivier salad, blini
- Rwanda: isombe, ibihaza, and ugali

=== S ===
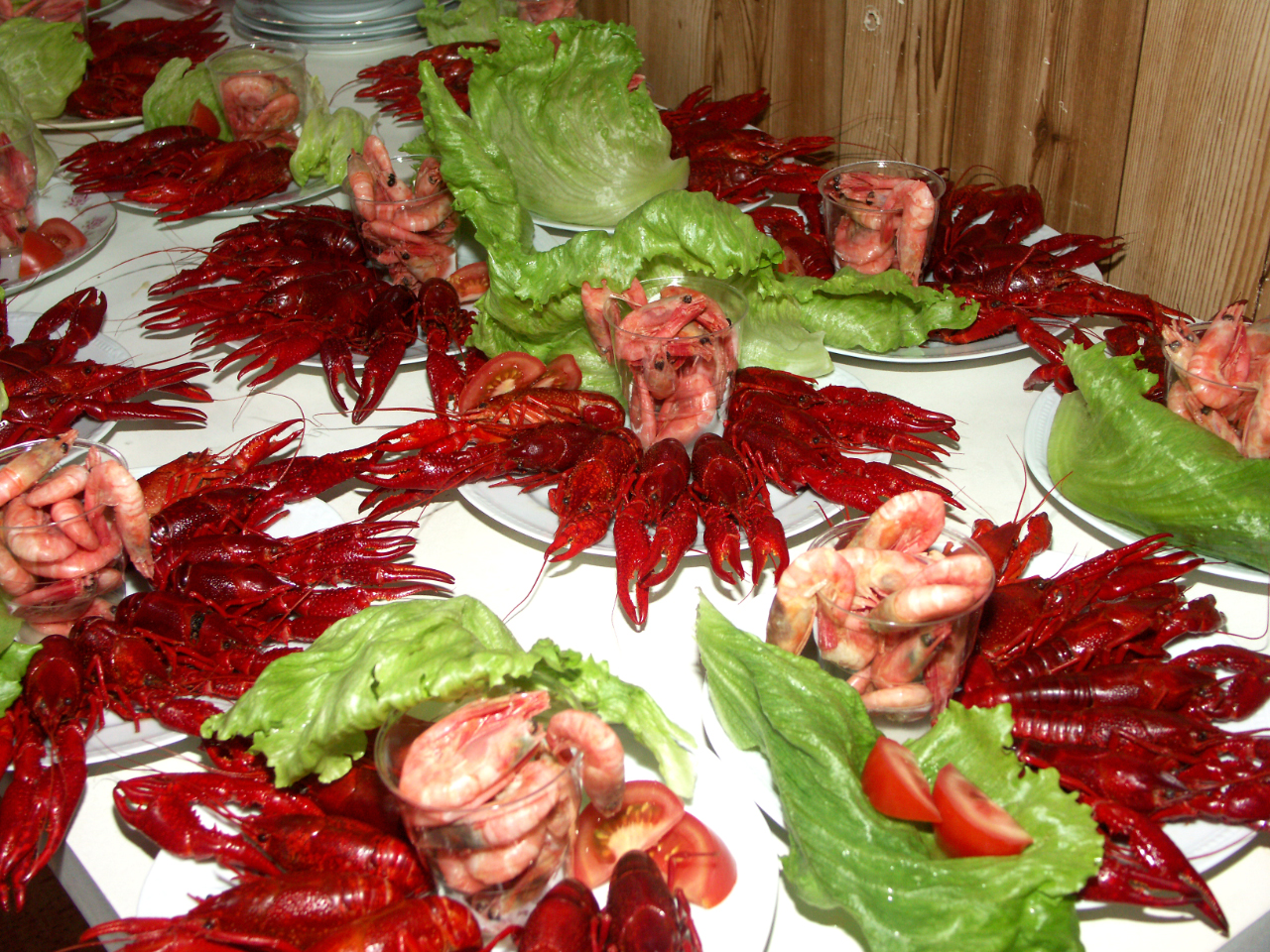
Swedish crayfish called Kräftskiva

- San Marino: torta tre monti
- Saudi Arabia: saleeg, kabsa, jareesh, maqshush
- Senegal: thieboudienne
- Serbia: ćevapčići, pljeskavica, gibanica (pastry), Karađorđeva steak, sarma, pasulj
- Singapore: chilli crab, Hainanese chicken rice, Hokkien mee
- Slovakia: pirohy, bryndzové halušky
- Slovenia: cremeschnitte, buckwheat dumplings (particularly štruklji), Idrijski žlikrofi, Carniolan sausage
- Somalia: bariis Iskukaris
- South Africa: bobotie,mieliepap and braai, and boerewors and chakalaka
- Spain: tortilla de patatas
  - Asturias: cachopo
  - Catalonia: pa amb tomaquet
  - Galicia: polbo á feira
  - Madrid: churro
  - Valencia: paella
- cuisine of Sri Lanka: rice and curry, kottu
- cuisine of Suriname: pom
- cuisine of Sweden: köttbullar, kräftskiva, surströmming (fermented Baltic herring), pickled herring with potatoes, ostkaka, smörgåstårta (savory sandwich cake) and kebab pizza.
- cuisine of Switzerland: fondue, muesli, raclette, rösti (core national dishes). Other dishes: cervelat (national sausage), Zürcher geschnetzeltes, cordon bleu
- Syria: kibbeh

=== T ===
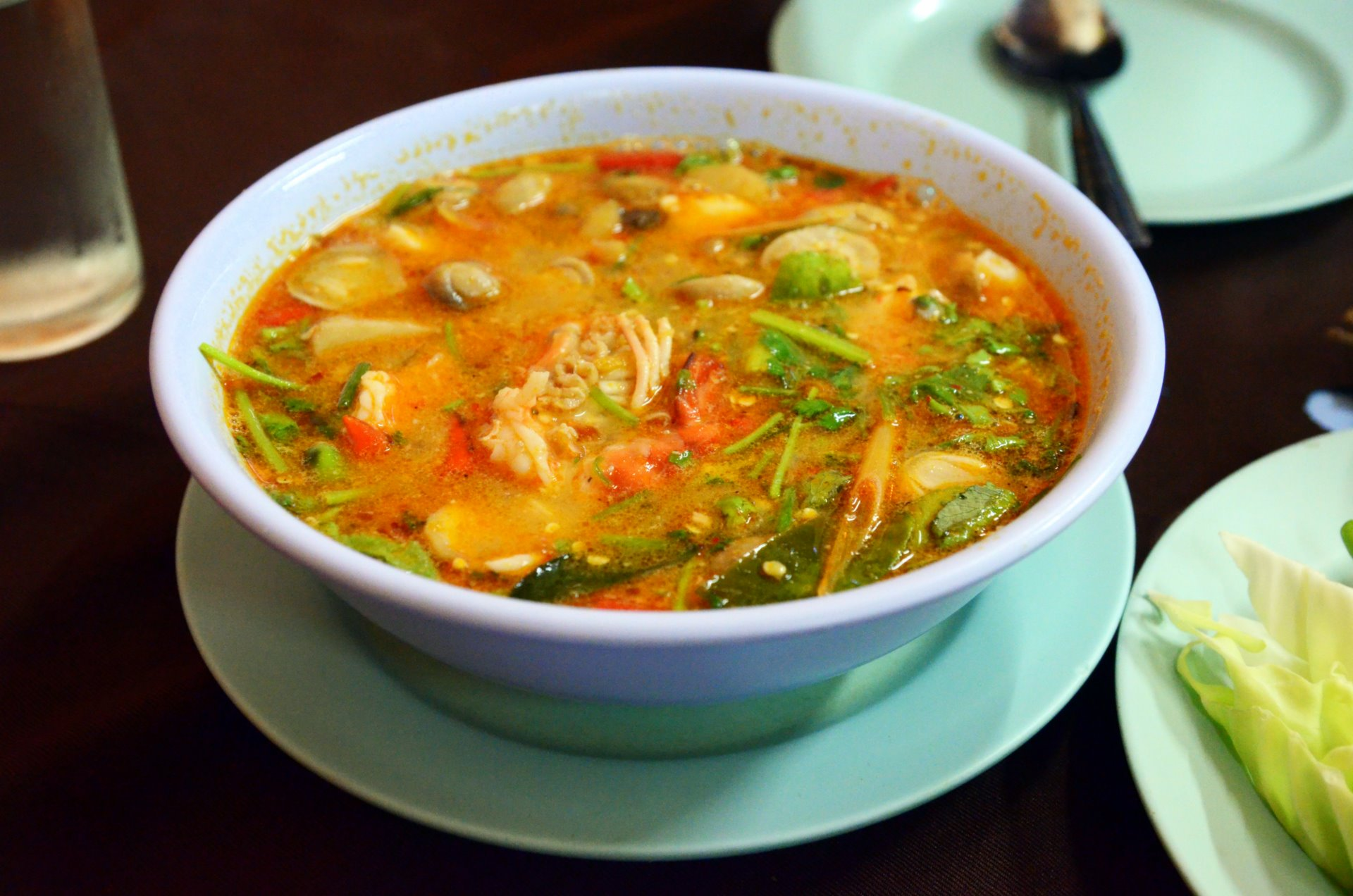
Tom yum kung, national dish of Thailand

- Tajikistan: osh palov, qurutob
- Taiwan: beef noodle soup, minced pork rice
- Tanzania: chipsi mayai
- Thailand: pad thai, pad gaprao, tom yum kung, som tam
- Togo: fufu
- Tonga: 'ota 'ika
- Trinidad and Tobago: doubles, pelau, bake and shark, Roti
  - Tobago: curry crab and dumplings
- Tunisia: couscous, brik/bric
- Turkey: doner kebab, dürüm, kuru fasulye with pilaf, kebap, baklava, simit, kapuska
- Tuvalu: pulaka

=== U ===
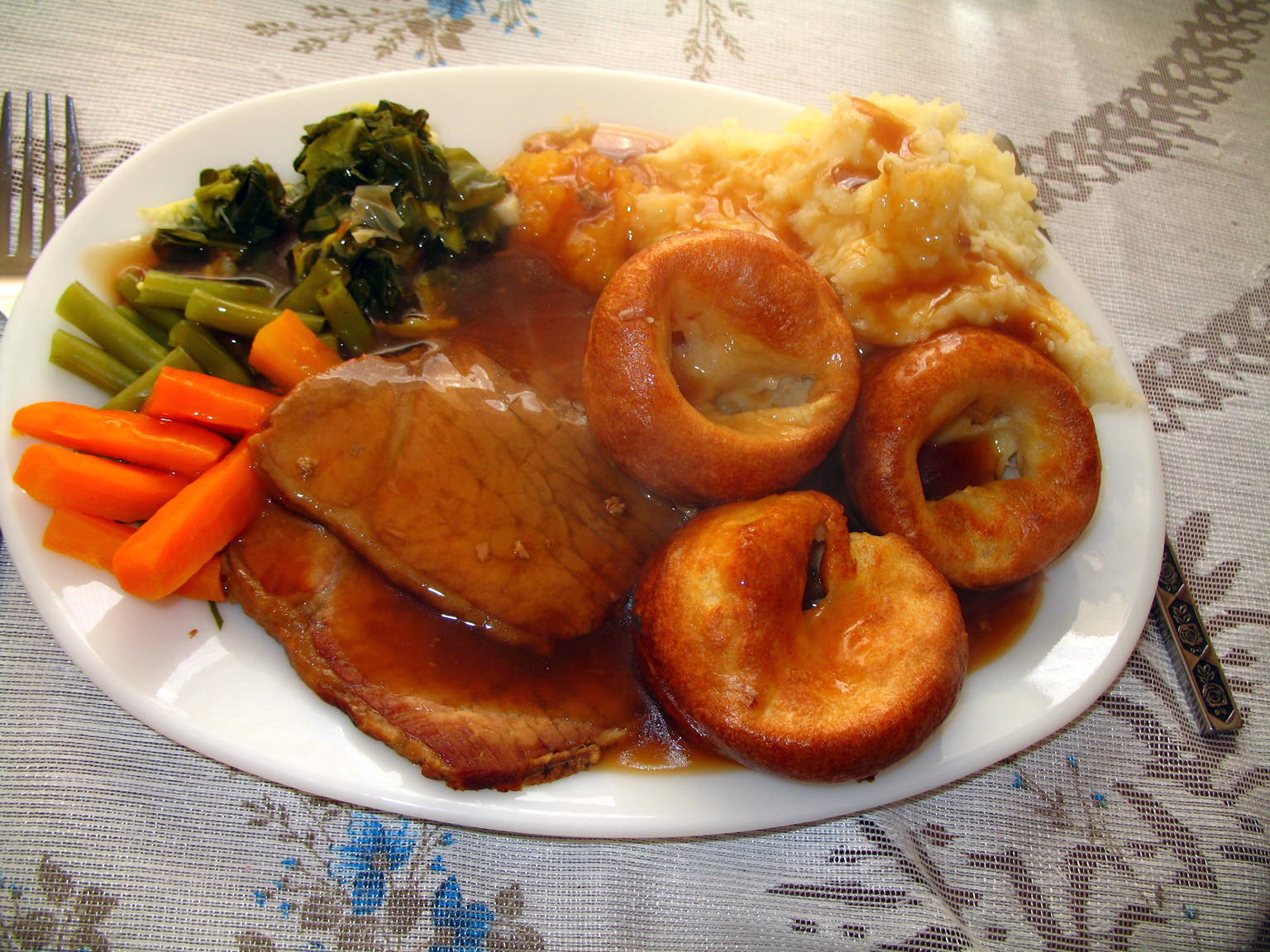
A Sunday roast – in this example, roast beef with mashed potatoes, vegetables is a national dish of the United Kingdom – here with Yorkshire pudding marking this variation as English.

- cuisine of Uganda: matooke
- cuisine of Ukraine: borscht, varenyky
- cuisine of United Arab Emirates: harees, shuwa
- United Kingdom: a "full" fry-up breakfast, Fried chicken, fish and chips Sunday roast (especially roast beef), chicken tikka masala, potato crisps
  - England: Melton Mowbray pork pies, crumpets, custard, apple pie, rhubarb crumble, pudding: (black pudding, steak and kidney pudding, Yorkshire pudding, plum pudding, spotted dick), trifle, roast beef
    - Cornwall: Cornish pasties
    - Devon: Devonshire cream tea, pasty
  - Northern Ireland: Barmbrack, boxty, champ, Ulster fry
  - Scotland: Burns supper of haggis with neeps and tatties, and scotch whisky, Arbroath smokies, kippers, kedgeree, Cullen skink, cock-a-leekie soup, porridge, rumbledethumps, Clootie dumpling, Cranachan, Dundee cake
    - Shetland Isles: Reestit mutton
  - Wales: bara brith, cawl, Glamorgan sausages, laverbread, Tatws Pum Munud, Welsh rarebit, Welsh cakes
- cuisine of United States: apple pie, cheeseburger, hamburger, hot dog, fried chicken, Salisbury steak, turkey, mashed potatoes and gravy (historical)
  - American Samoa: palusami
  - Guam: Kelaguen, Spam
  - Hawaii: Saimin
  - Northern Mariana Islands: Kelaguen
  - Puerto Rico: lechon, mofongo, arroz con gandules
  - United States Virgin Islands: funji
- cuisine of Uruguay: chivito
- Uzbekistan: Uzbek Plov (also spelled palov and sometimes called osh)

=== V ===
- Vanuatu: laplap
- Vatican City: Fettuccine alla Papalina (unofficial)
- Venezuela: pabellón criollo, arepa

=== Y ===
- Yemen: saltah

=== Z ===
- Zambia: nshima
- Zimbabwe: sadza

== Latin American dishes ==
In Latin America, dishes may be claimed or designated as a plato nacional, although in many cases, recipes transcend national borders with only minor variations. Preparations of ceviche are endemic in Peru and Ecuador, while a thin cut of beef known as matambre is considered close to being a national dish in Paraguay. Stews of meat, plantains, and root vegetables are the platos nacionales of several countries in Central America, South America, and the Caribbean: Colombian ajiaco, as well as the sancocho of the Dominican Republic, Colombia, and Panama, are examples of platos nacionales. Janer (2008) observes that this sharing of the same plato nacional by different countries calls into question the idea that every country has a unique national dish that is special to that country; she states that cuisine does not respect national and geopolitical borders.

The identification of Latin American national dishes is stronger among expatriate communities in North America. In Latin American countries, the plato nacional is usually part of the cuisine of rural and peasant communities, and not necessarily part of the everyday cuisine of city dwellers. In expatriate communities, the dish is strongly reclaimed in order to retain the sense of national identity and ties to one's homeland, and is proudly served in homes and restaurants. By this show of national identity, the community can resist social pressures that push for homogenization of many ethnically and culturally diverse communities into a single all-encompassing group identity, such as Latino or Hispanic American.

== Gallery ==
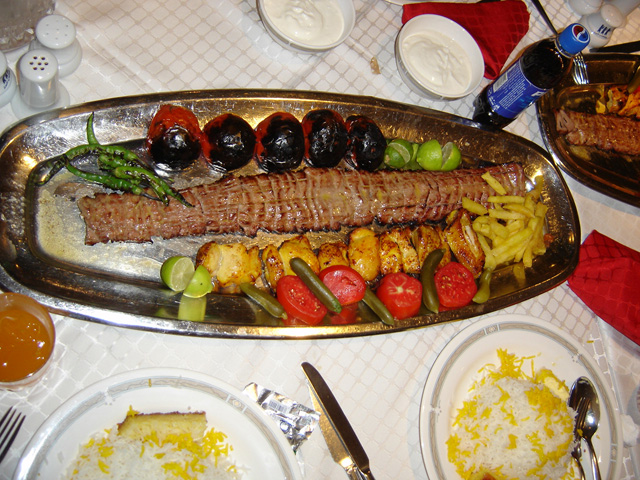
Chelo kabab, a national dish of Iran

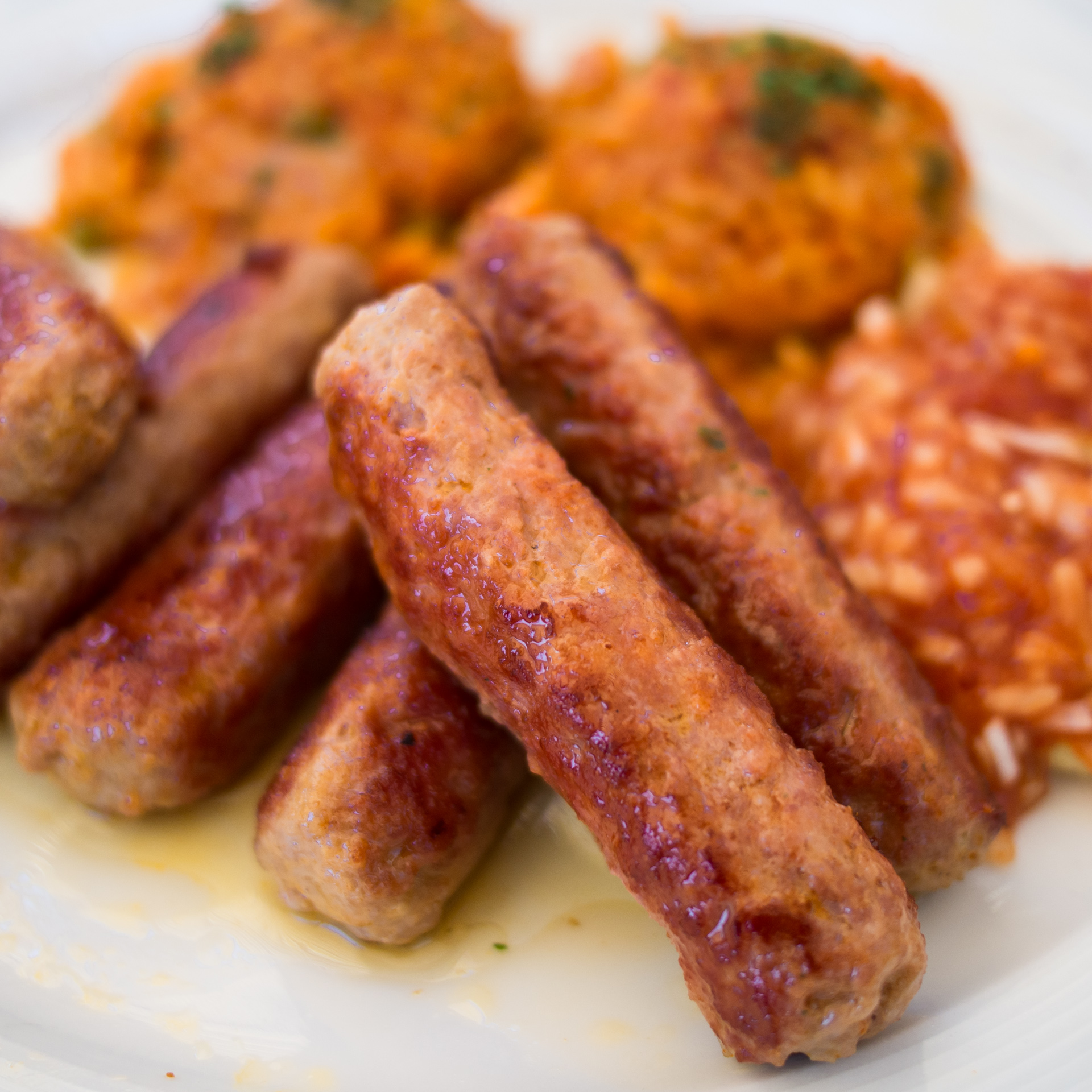
Ćevapčići, considered a national dish in several Balkan states

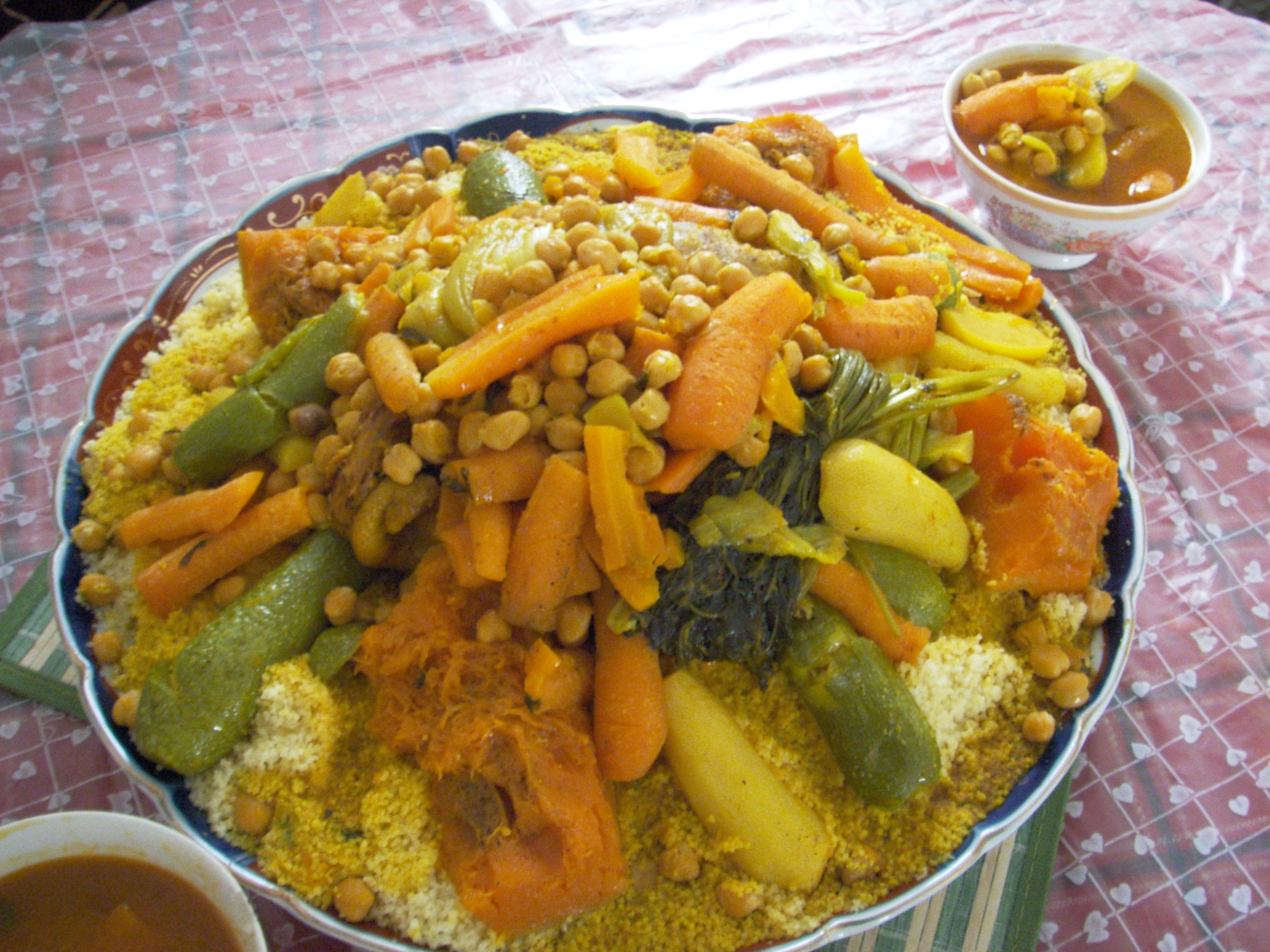
Couscous, national dish of Morocco, Algeria and Tunisia

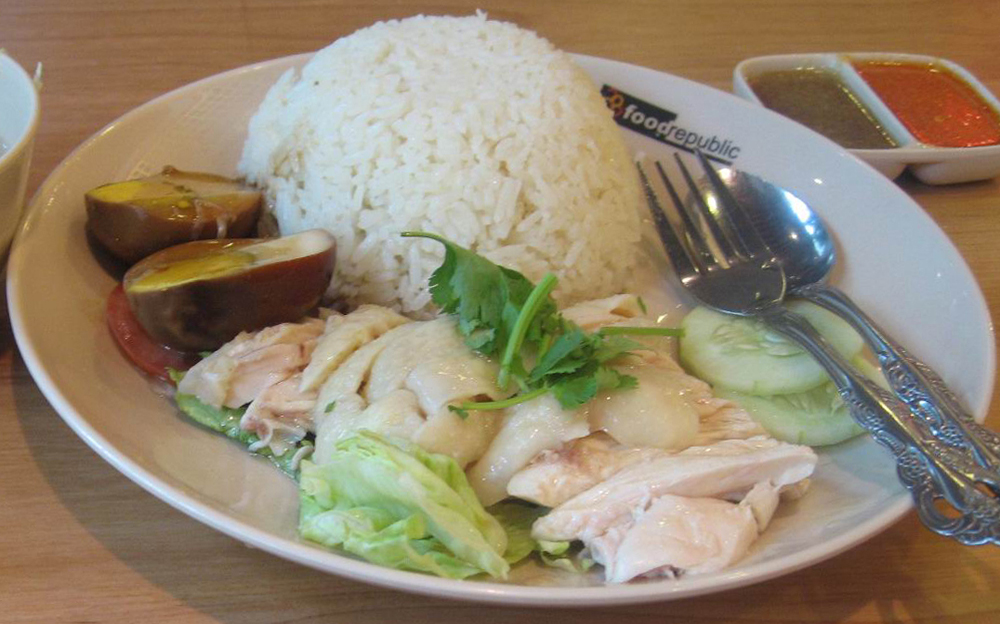
Hainanese chicken rice, a national dish of Singapore

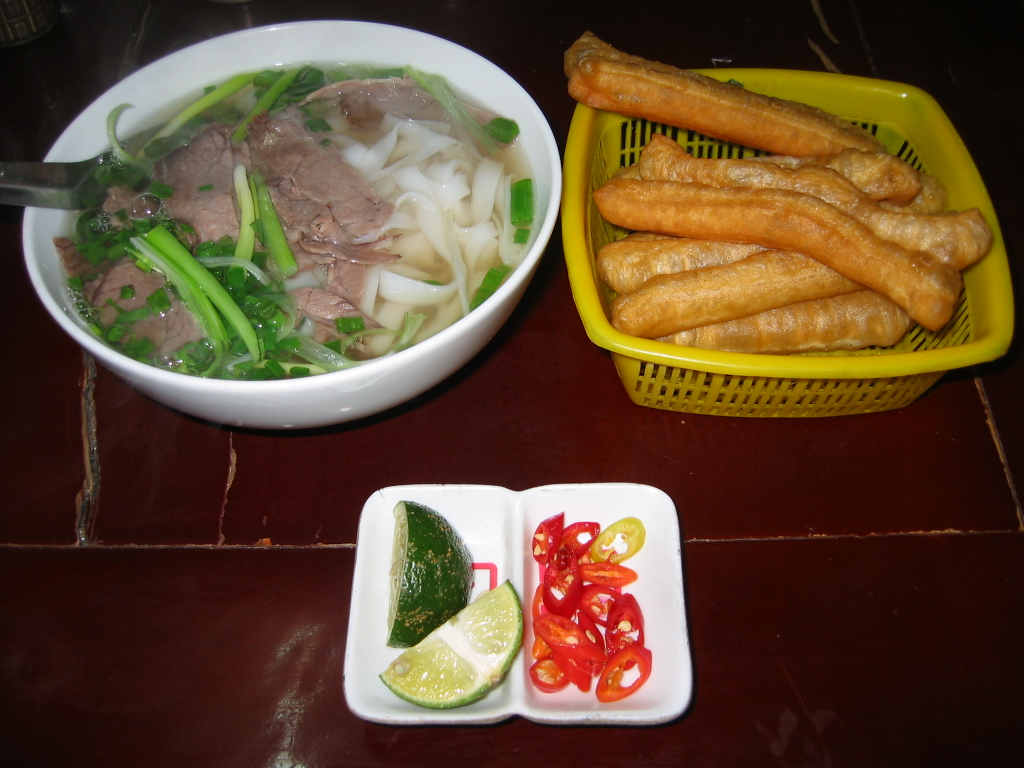
Phở, Vietnamese noodle soup, considered a Vietnamese national dish

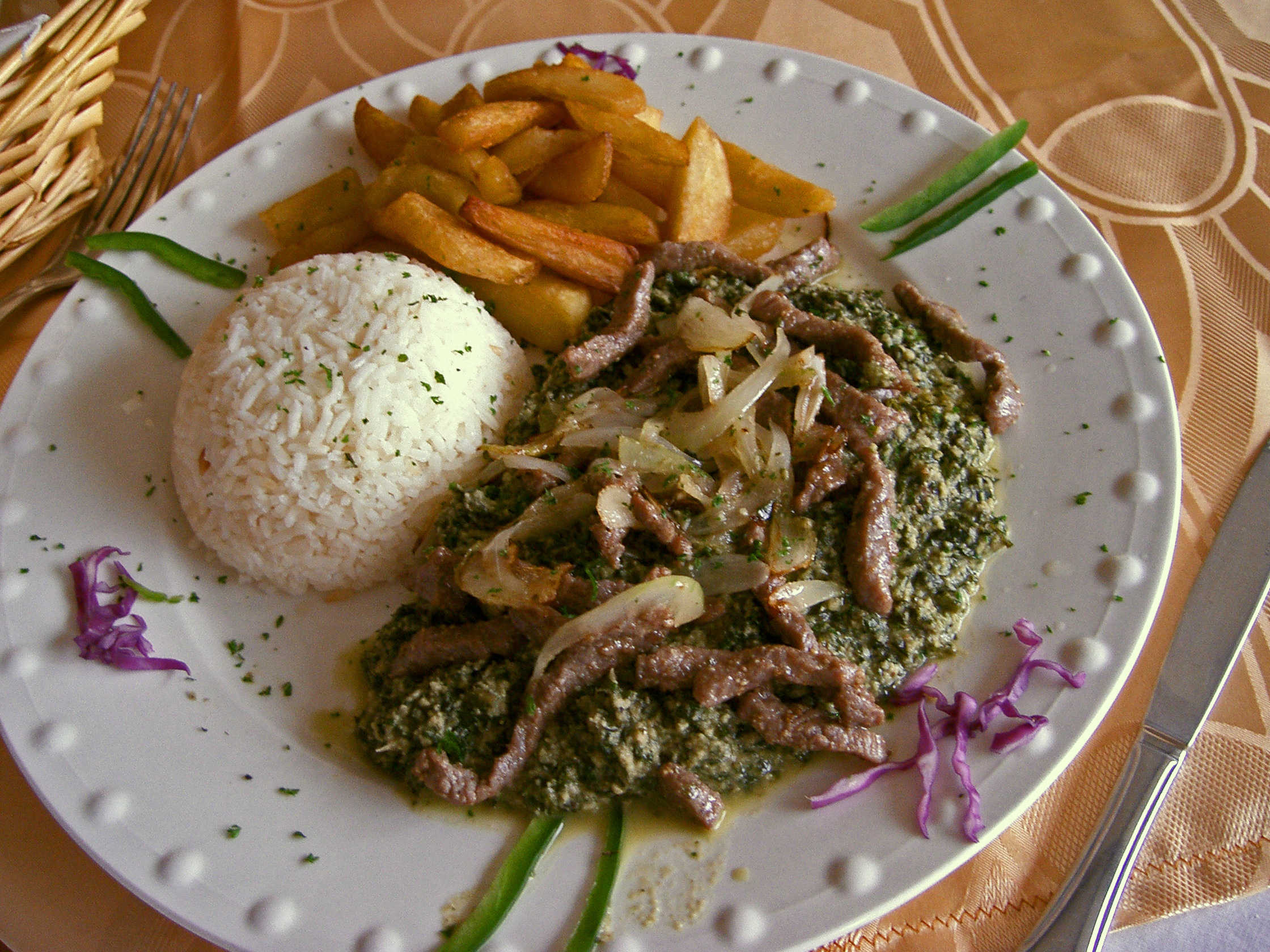
Ndolé from Cameroon

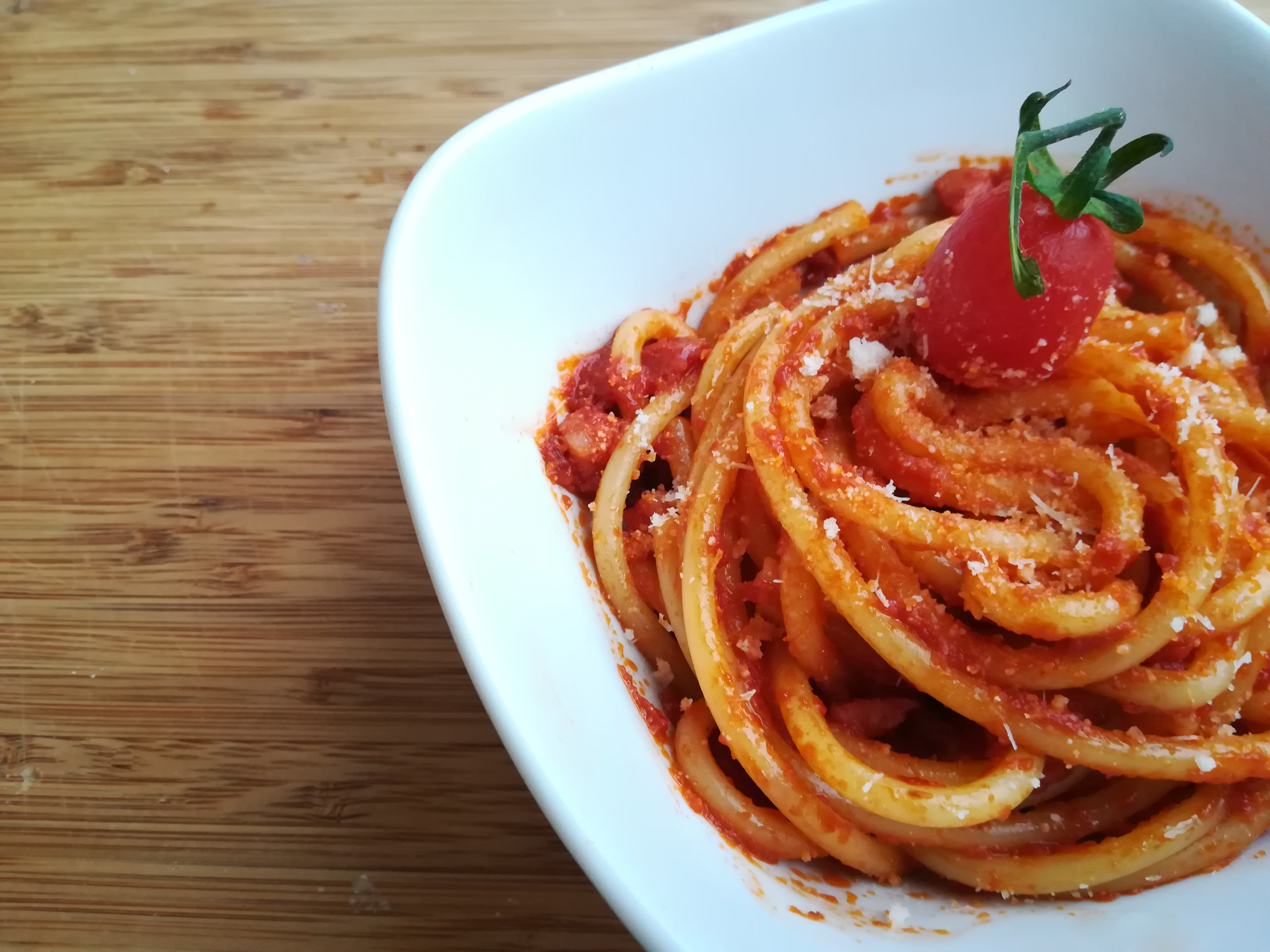
Bucatini with amatriciana sauce. Pasta is considered one of the national dishes of Italy

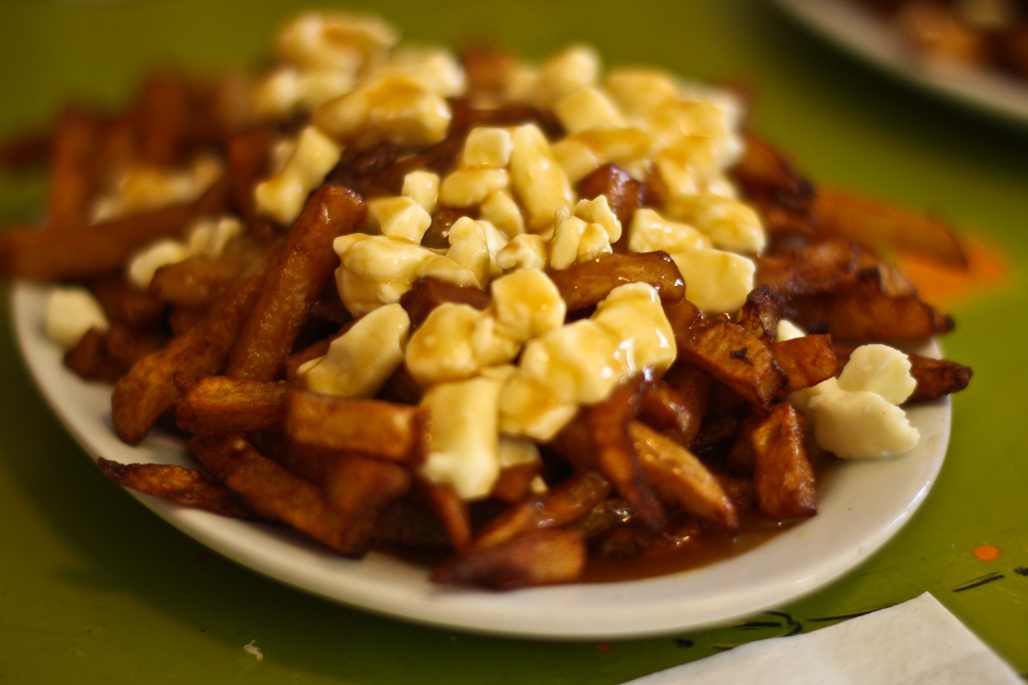
Poutine, considered one of the national dishes of Canada

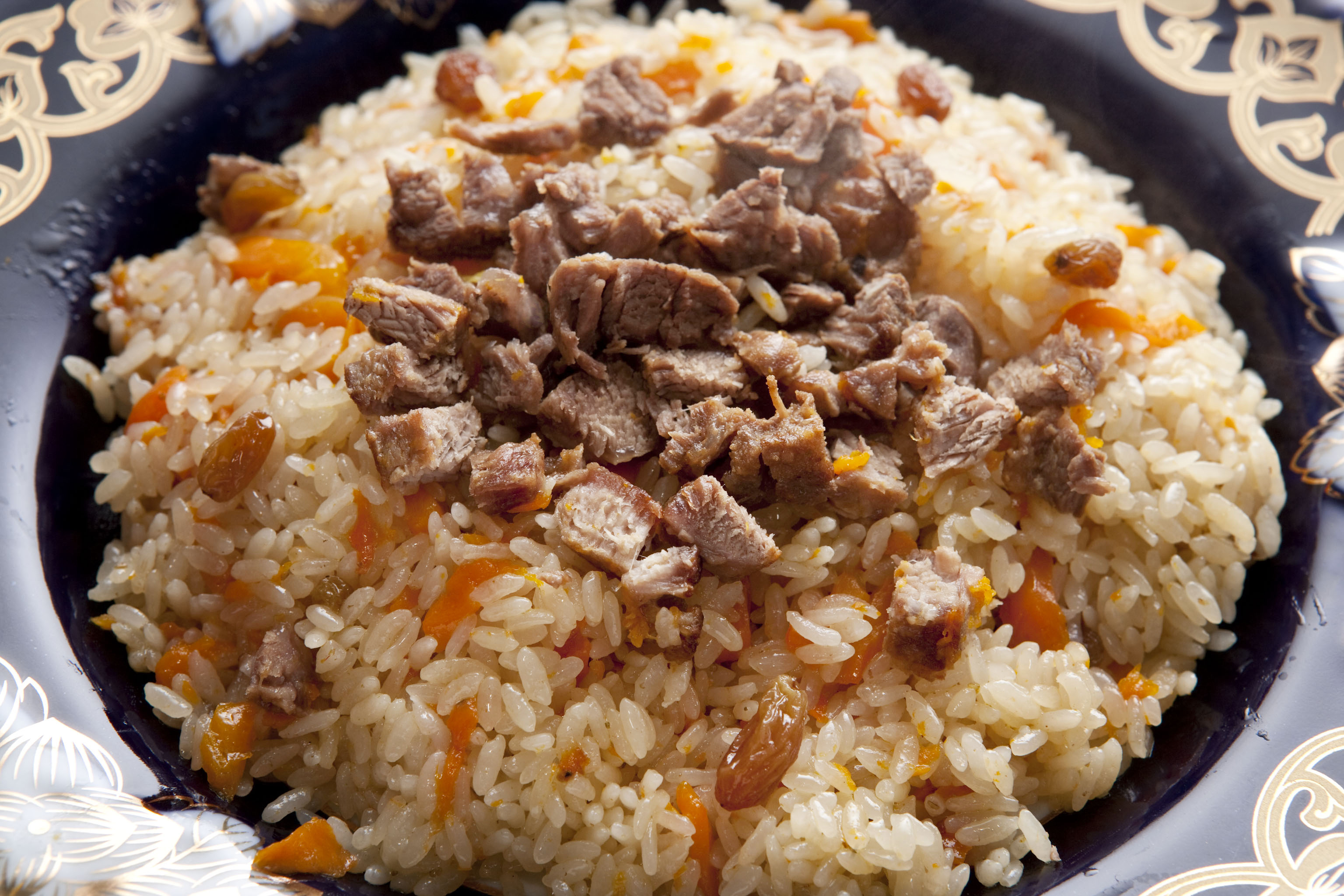
Pilaf (O'sh), a national dish in the cuisines of Central Asia

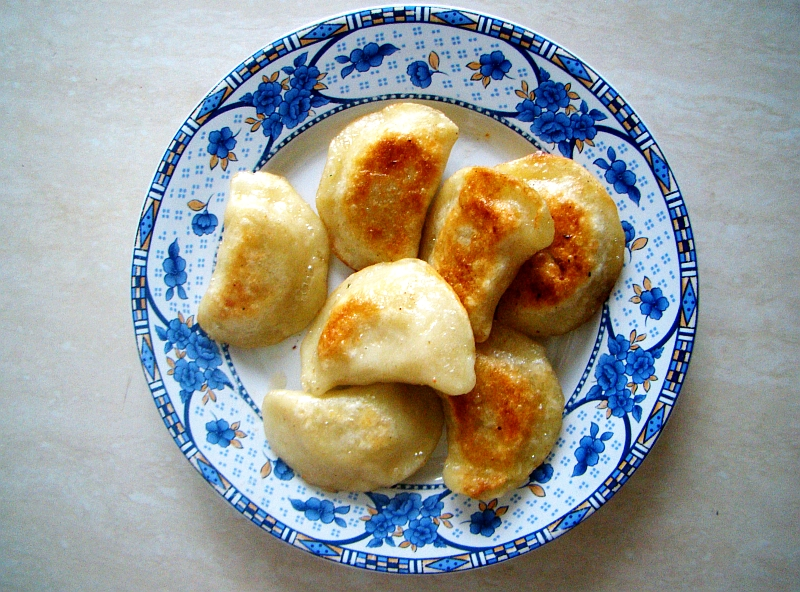
Pierogi ruskie, Ruthenian dumplings of Kresy, a national dish of Poland.

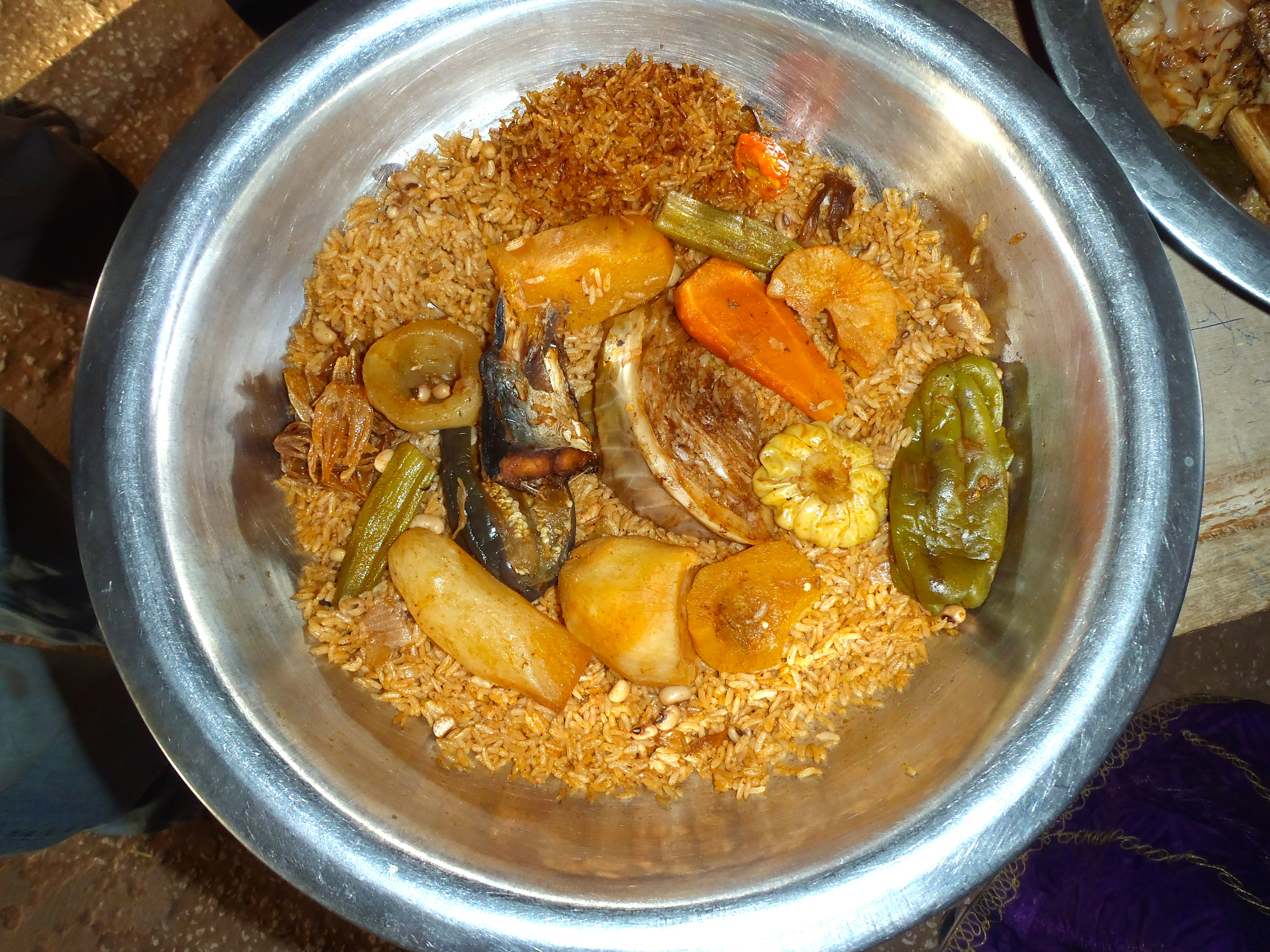
Thieboudienne, Senegal national meal

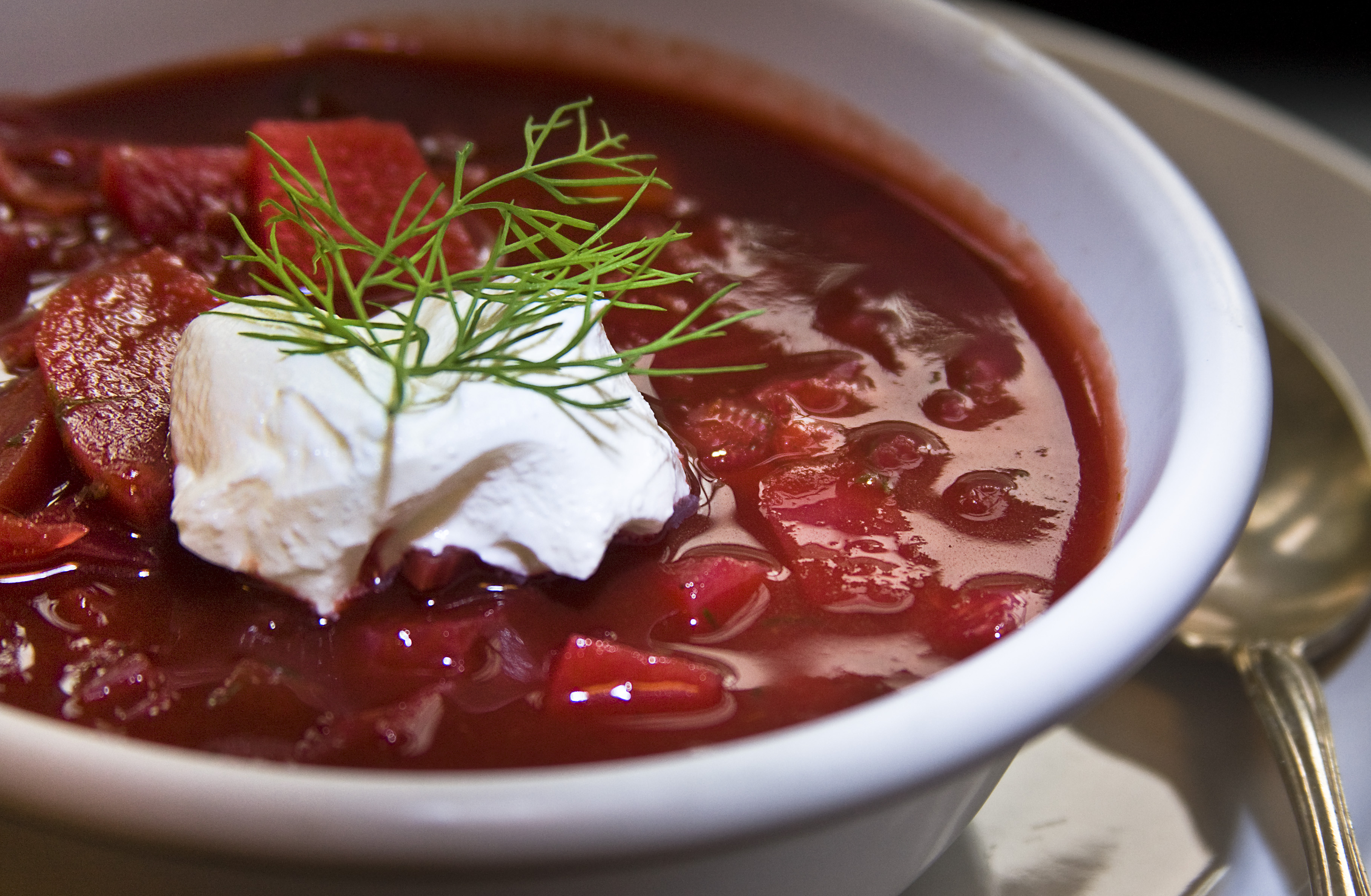
Ukrainian borscht

== Drink ==
=== National drinks ===
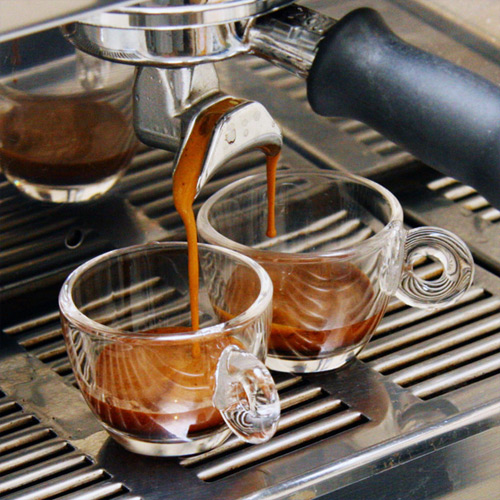
The espresso is a national drink of Italy. Its name comes from the Italian esprimere, which means "to express," and refers to the process by which hot water is forced under pressure through ground coffee.

A national drink is a distinct beverage that is strongly associated with a particular country, and can be part of their national identity and self-image. These drinks can be either alcoholic or non-alcoholic. Alcoholic national drinks might be spirits consumed straight (like vodka in Russia), but more often, they are mixed drinks (such as caipirinhas in Brazil and Singapore Slings in Singapore), beer, or wine. Non-alcoholic national drinks include Coca-Cola in the United States, boba tea in Taiwan, and Thai iced tea in Thailand.

Several factors can qualify a beverage as a national drink:

- Regional ingredients and popularity: The drink is made from locally sourced ingredients and is commonly consumed, such as mango lassi in India, which uses dahi, a traditional yogurt.
- Unique local ingredients: The beverage contains an exotic ingredient that is unique to the region.
- Cultural tradition: The drink plays a significant role in festive traditions and cultural heritage.
- Official promotion: The country actively promotes the drink as a national symbol.

Choosing a single national drink can be challenging for some countries due to their diverse cultures and populations, such as Mexico or India. Conversely, some beverages, like pisco sour, are claimed by more than one country—both Peru and Chile, in this case.

== See also ==
- Index of sociology of food articles
- Gastronationalism
- Traditional food
