= Nauruan cuisine =

Culinary traditions of Nauru

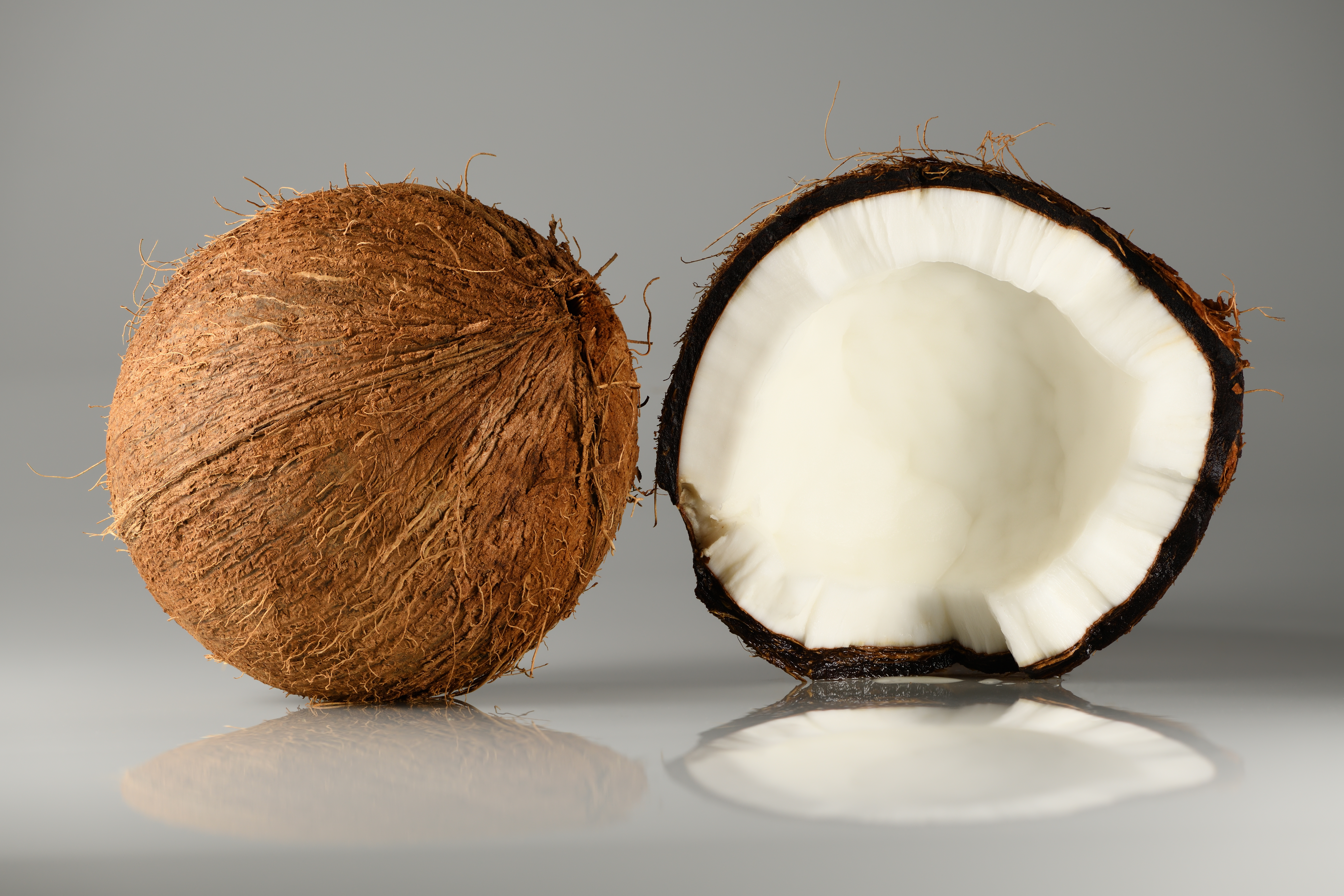
- Coconuts, a staple food in Nauru
- Country or region: Nauru
- National dish: Coconut fish
- National drink: Iced coffee

The cuisine of Nauru is the traditional cuisine of the island state on the Pacific Ocean.

Nauru has the world's highest rate of obesity.

== Basic foods ==
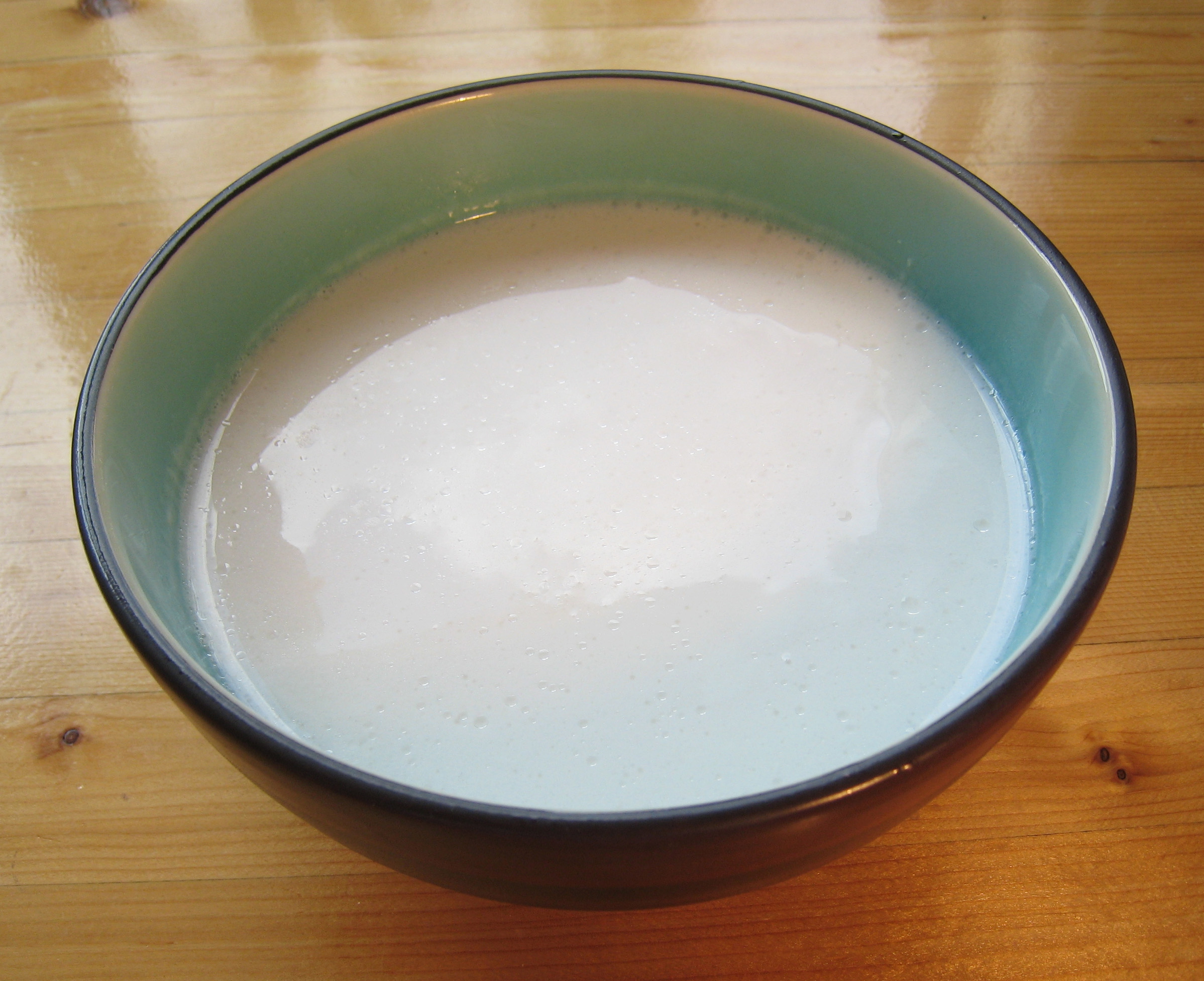
A bowl of coconut milk (canned)

Like its other island neighbours, Nauruans consume a large amount of seafood, as well as foods made from coconuts and pandanus fruits. Coconut milk is also used extensively in Nauru. Coconut fish (raw fish, often tuna, served in coconut milk with seasonings) is a traditional dish.

The native Nauruan names of traditional crops are:

- epo/épo: Pandanus tectorius
- ini: Cocos nucifera

== Influences ==
Nauruan cuisine is greatly influenced by Chinese cuisine. The Chinese are the major foreign community of the country, and there are a number of Chinese restaurants on the island, most notably in Yaren.

Nauruan cuisine also commonly shows strong Western influence, especially from Australia.

== Traditions ==
The majority of Nauruans are Christians, and members of the Nauru Congregational Church. They often celebrate Christmas with Christmas cakes made from banana and coconut.

Some desserts, such as coconut mousse, are consumed on special occasions.
