= Matambre =

Thin cut of beef in South American cuisine

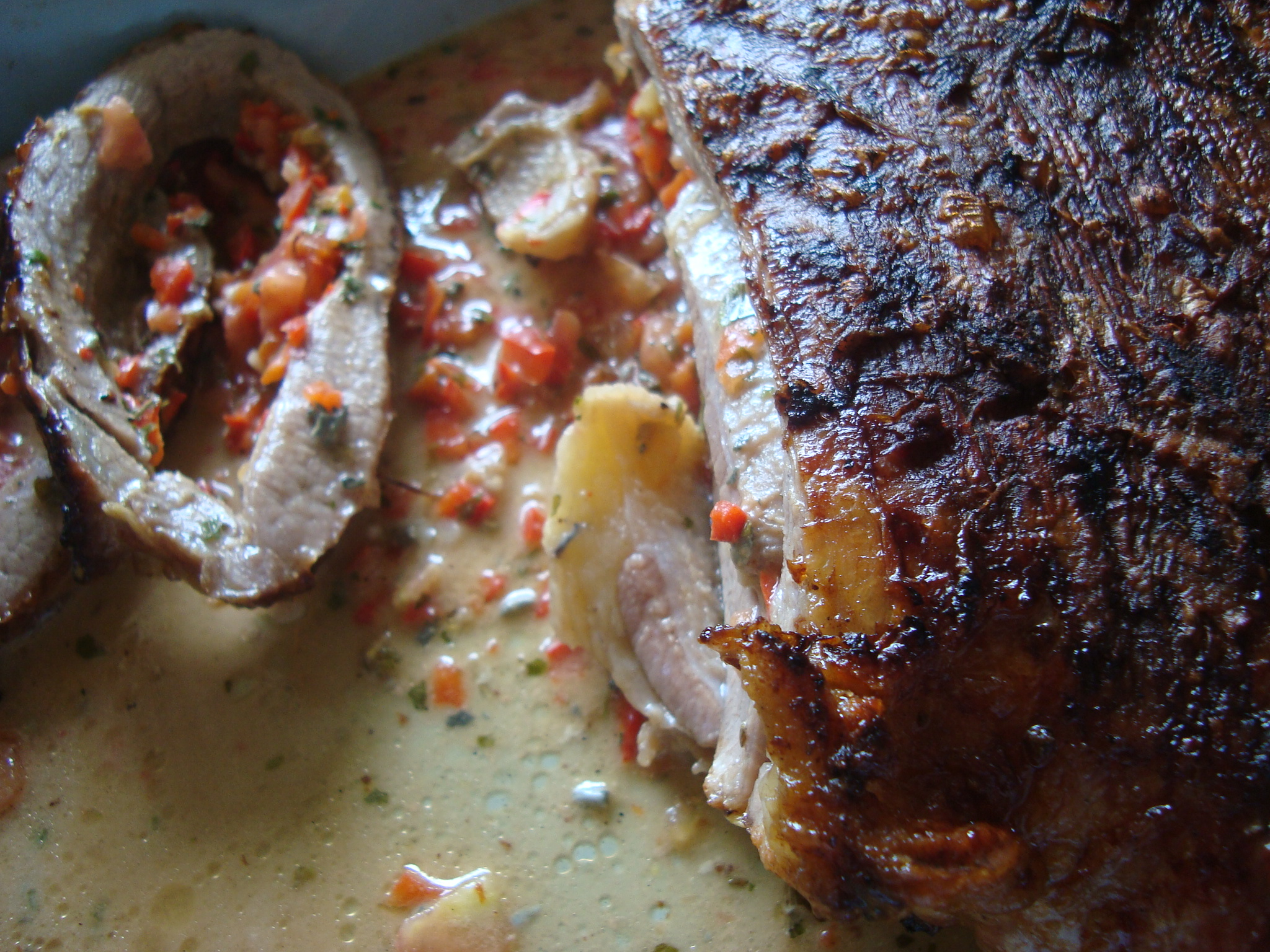
A matambre relleno

Matambre is the name of a very thin cut of beef in Argentina, Uruguay, Rio Grande do Sul and also Paraguay. It is a rose-colored muscle taken between the skin and the ribs of the steer, a sort of flank steak. It is not the cut known normally in the U.S. as flank steak. Some people refer to it as the "fly shaker", because it is the muscle used by the animal to twitch to repel flies and other flying insects.

== Overview ==
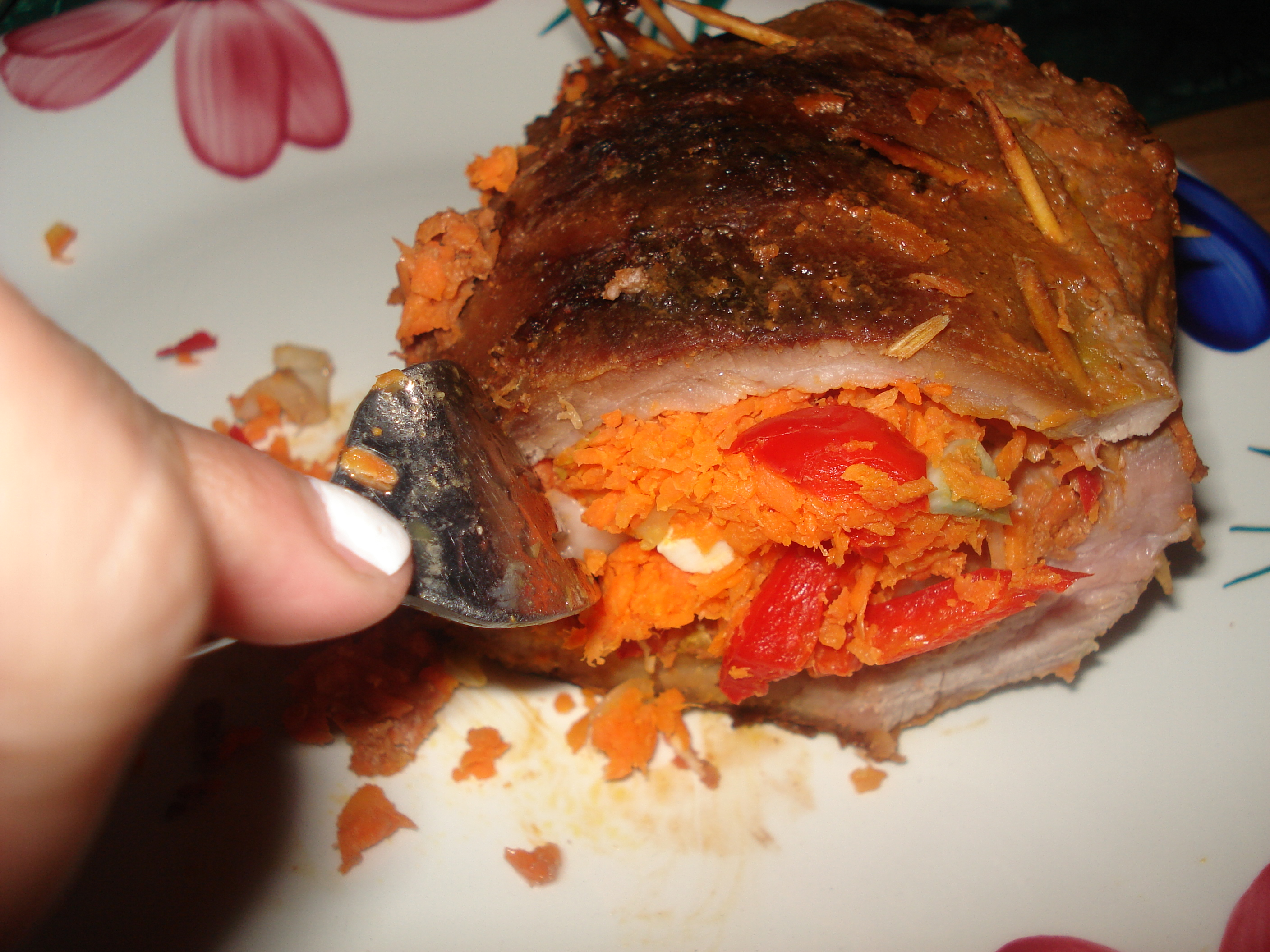
Cross section of a matambre relleno

The same word (or matambre arrollado or matambre relleno) is also used for a dish made of a matambre meat roll stuffed with vegetables, peppers, ham, hard-boiled eggs and herbs, then boiled or oven-roasted. It is served sliced—with the fillings making a colourful display—either hot or cold. It is often eaten with chimichurri sauce. It is a rather fatty meat and is usually eaten with vegetables. Pork matambre is also used.

The name matambre is formed from the combination of "matar" and "hambre" ("hunger killer").

== Cut ==
Matambre is cut from the side of the cow, between the skin and the ribs. The scientific name for the muscle is cutaneous trunci. It is a thin rose-colored muscle, also known in packing houses as "fly shaker" or "elephant ear". It is also known as the "twitch" muscle because the animal makes it twitch or tremble to repel flying insects like flies. It is very thin and lends itself for rolling up with different stuffings.

== Argentine variations ==
In Argentina, the matambre is sometimes served as a steak, but this is not the typical serving method. The more common method is known as "matambre arrollado" (stuffed, or filled matambre). The ingredients for this dish vary from province to province, but most common include whole carrots, hard-boiled eggs, and plenty of black pepper. These ingredients are then rolled up inside of the matambre sheet and sewn or pinned together to keep the rolled matambre from coming unrolled. It is then boiled in milk, or sometimes water, and roasted in the oven. After it is removed from the oven and cooled, it is sliced into thin pieces of lunch meat and served in a toasted French roll with mayonnaise, and sometimes Argentine chimichurri, as a condiment. In Uruguay, and to a lesser extent in Argentina, matambre is marinated in milk, baked flat in the oven, and covered with the marinade, with the addition of lightly beaten eggs and cheese at the end of the cooking period. It is called "matambre a la leche" (matambre in milk). Another method of serving matambre is "matambre a la pizza" which is prepared similarly, but instead of being rolled it is topped with pizza ingredients like tomato sauce and mozzarella.

== See also ==
- Argentine cuisine
- Roulade
- Farsu magru
- List of stuffed dishes
