= Grilled cold noodles =

Street food popular in Chinese culture

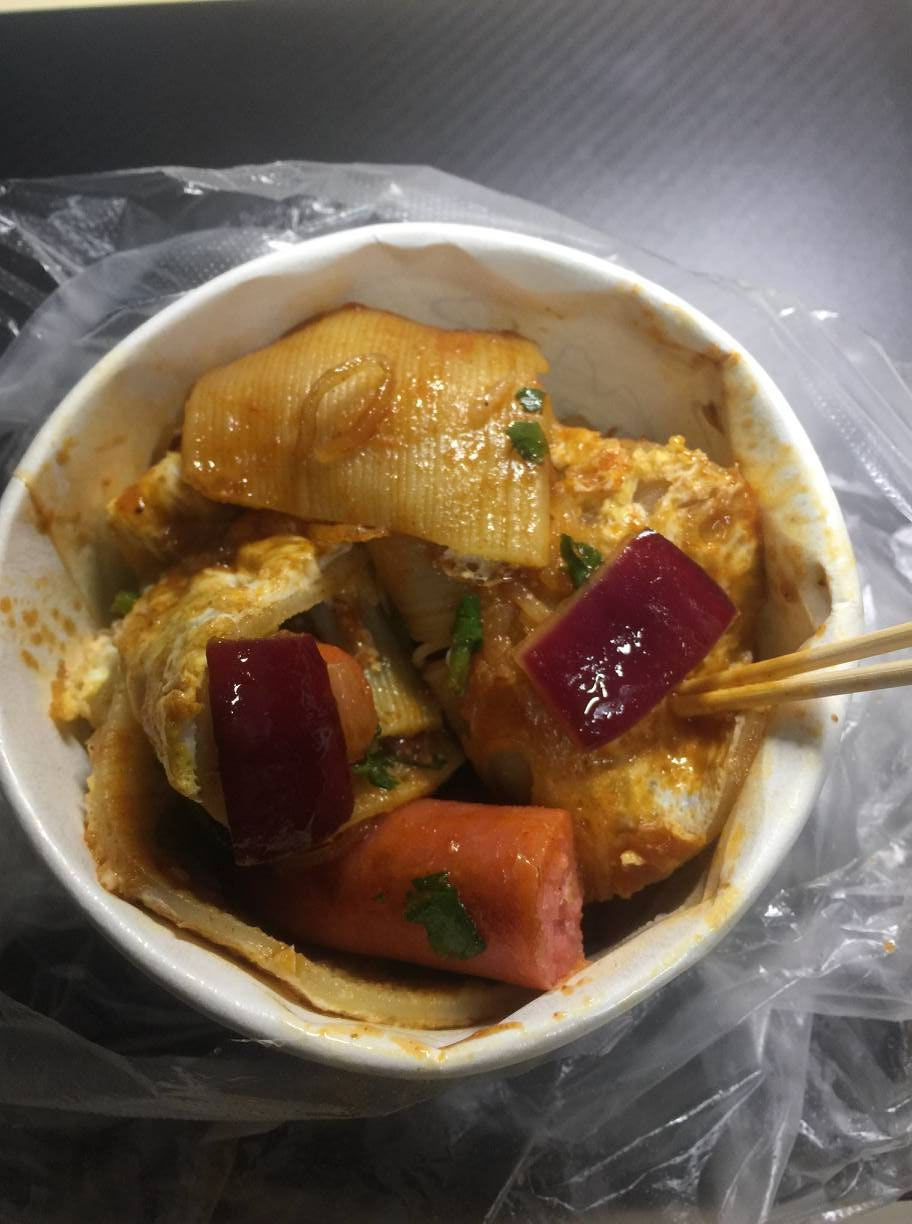
Grilled cold noodles

Grilled cold noodles (Chinese: 烤冷面; pinyin: kǎolěngmiàn) is a local specialized snack of the Chinese province of Heilongjiang. It is also used as a side dish, usually sold at night markets or roadside stands rather than in restaurant chains.

Grilled cold noodles are usually cooked with noodles that somewhat resemble pieces of paper, and with eggs, onions, and other auxiliary materials, The main condiment is sweet bean sauce or gochujang.

Traditionally, there are three different ways to cook the dish: grilling, teppanyaki and frying.

== Name ==
Cold noodles in Chinese cuisine are referred to as liángmiàn (凉面, "chilled noodles"). The term lěngmiàn (冷面, "cold noodles") is mainly associated with Korean-style cold noodles (naengmyeon), which are popular in Northeast China, especially the Yanji-style cold noodles (延吉冷面), a dish of the ethnic Korean communities of the region.

Although kǎolěngmiàn contains the word lěngmiàn, the dish is not directly derived from Korean cold noodles. Rather, it developed in Northeast China from starch noodle sheets used in the production of Korean-style cold noodles in the region. As these sheets began to be mass-produced and sold cheaply, street vendors used them to create a grilled snack cooked on charcoal stoves or iron griddles.

Vendors commonly market the dish under names such as "Northeast grilled cold noodles" (东北烤冷面), "Heilongjiang grilled cold noodles" (黑龙江烤冷面), and sometimes "Harbin grilled cold noodles" (哈尔滨烤冷面), despite the dish not having originated in Harbin. It is also sometimes marketed as "Korean grilled cold noodles" (朝鲜烤冷面 / 韩国烤冷面) because of its association with Korean-style cold noodles (lěngmiàn) in the name, even though grilled cold noodles themselves did not originate in Korea.

== History ==
There are two main theories as to the birthplace of grilled cold noodles. Some people believe that the dish originated in Mishan, while others believe that it started in Mudanjiang.

According to legend, a man called Gai Guofeng (盖国峰) who sold snacks at the backdoor of Second Middle School of Mishan City liked to grill cold noodles for himself as a dish to go with wine. Unexpectedly, students of the Second Middle School of Mishan City found that the dish was very delicious, and it became very popular in Mishan.

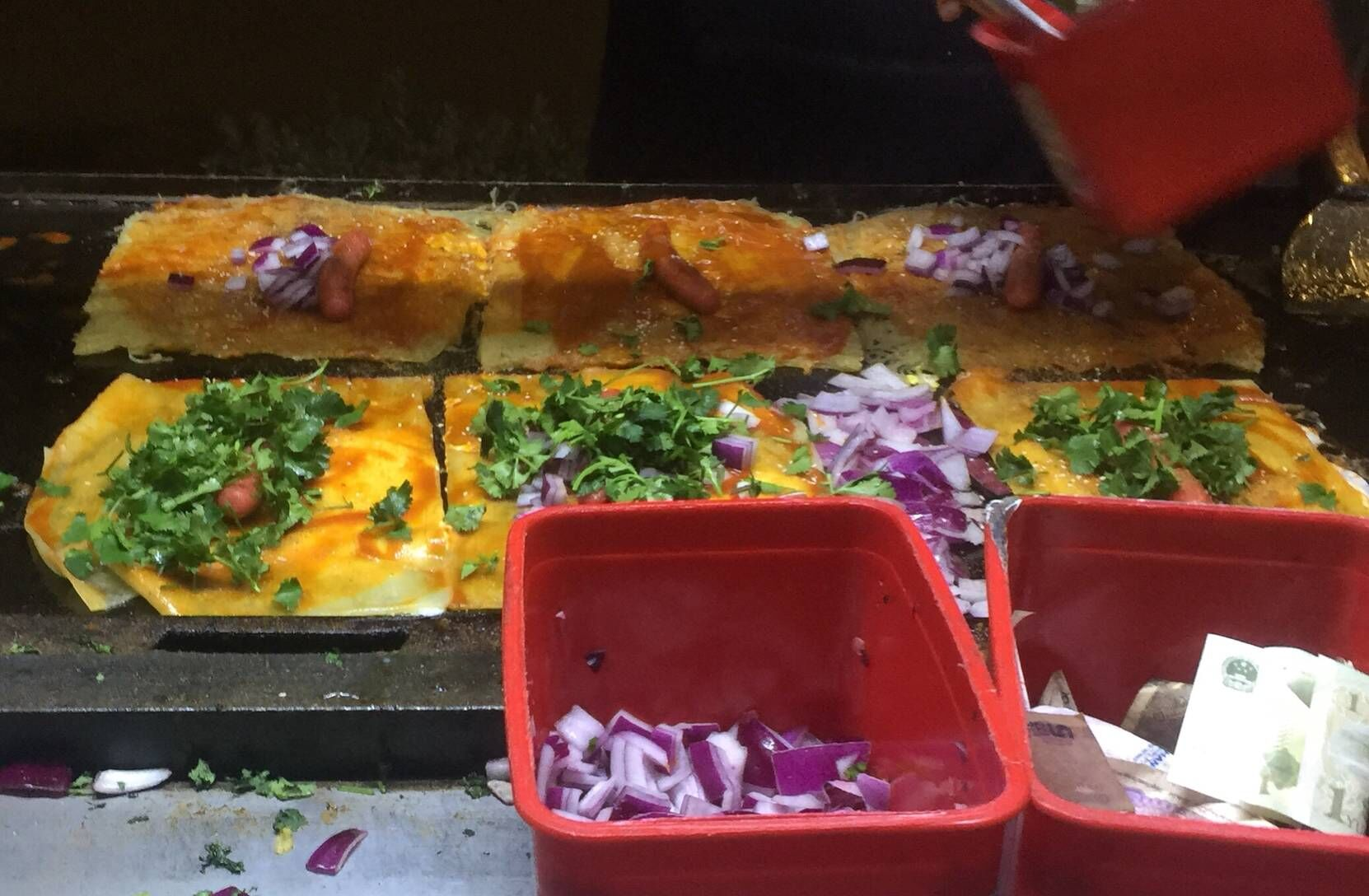
Grilled cold noodles cooked using teppanyaki

However, the original cold noodle dish was not soft enough, and was a little hard to chew. After the use of softer noodles, grilled cold noodles was gradually accepted by people all around China. However, grilled cold noodles are still known for their chewiness. The chewy texture comes from gluten.

== Variations ==
- Grilled: The noodles and sauce are put in a grilling basket.
- Fry: Popular primarily in Mishan. The noodles are fried and then brushed with sauce.
- Teppanyaki: This is the most common way to cook the dish using Teppanyaki cold noodles with onion, eggs and sausage.
