= Slovenian cuisine =

Culinary traditions of Slovenia

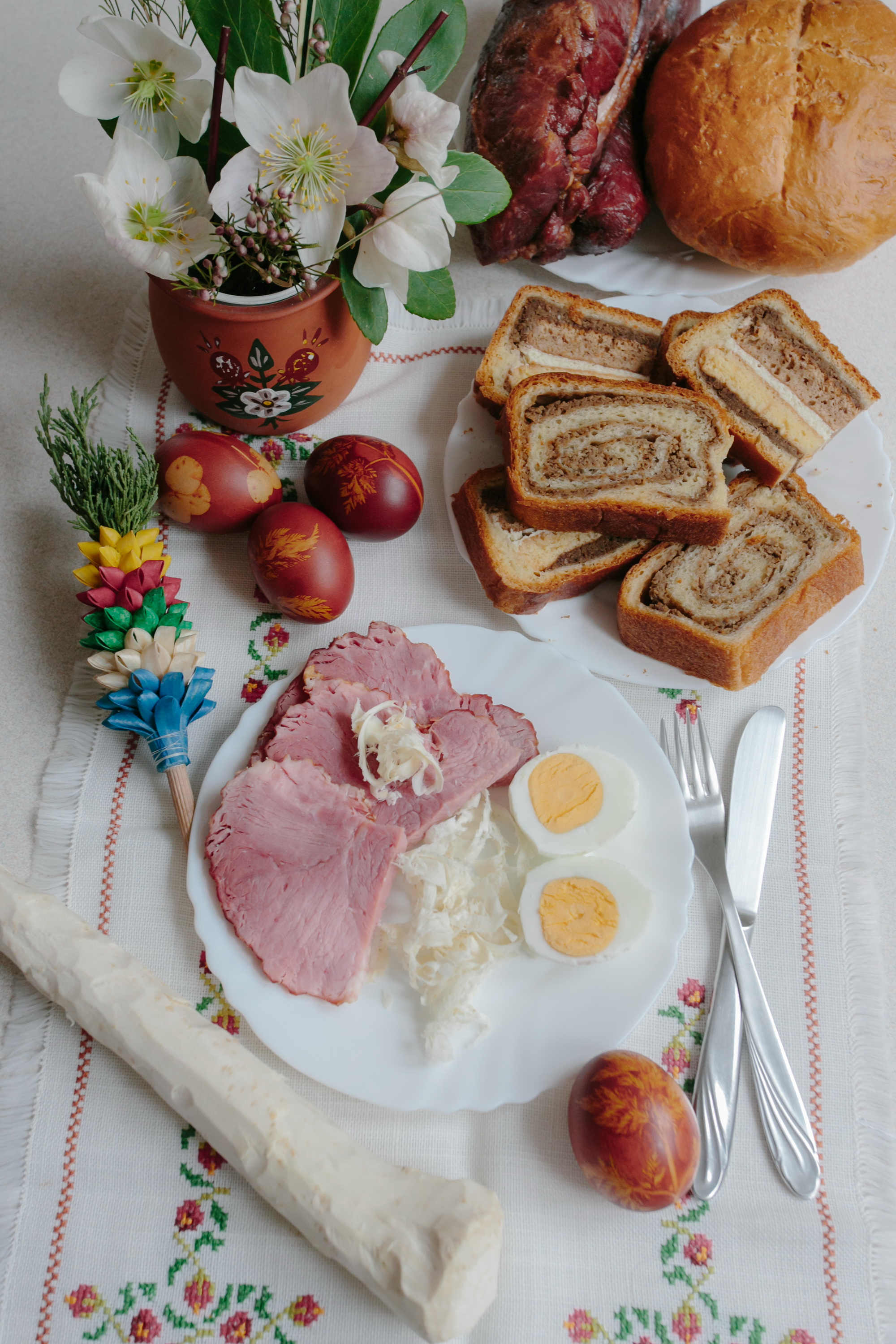
Potica pastry as part of traditional Slovenian Easter breakfast

Slovenian cuisine (Slovene: slovenska kuhinja) is influenced by the diversity of Slovenia's landscape, climate, history and neighbouring cultures. In 2016, the leading Slovenian ethnologists divided the country into 24 gastronomic regions. The first Slovene-language cookbook was published by Valentin Vodnik in 1798.

== Foods and dishes ==
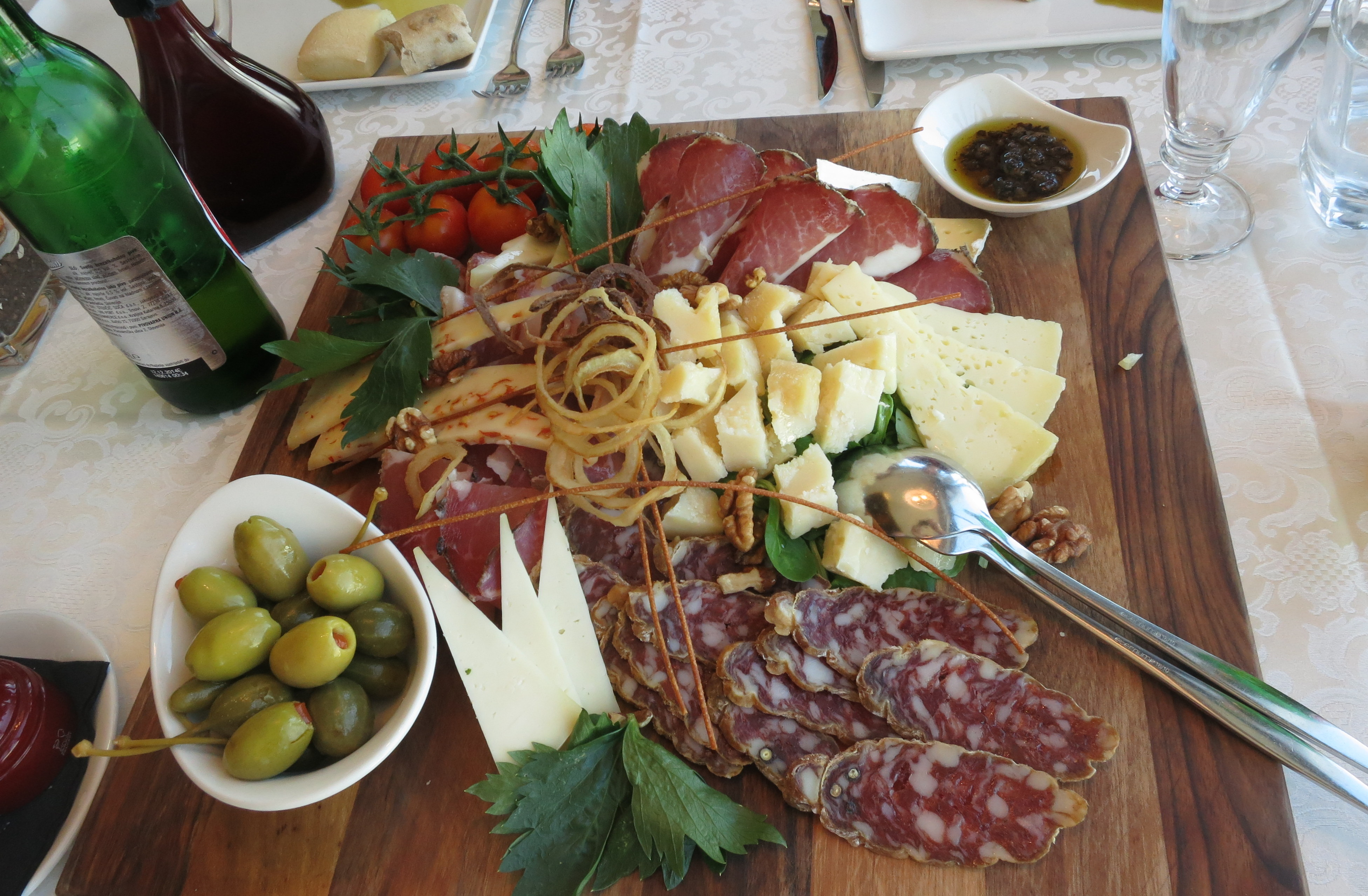
Plate of various sorts of Slovenian cheese and meat together with garnish

Soups are a relatively recent invention in Slovenian cuisine, but there are over 100. Earlier, there were various kinds of porridge, stew and one-pot meals. The most common soups without meat were lean and plain. A typical dish is aleluja, a soup made from turnip peels and a well-known dish during fasting. The most common meat soup is beef soup with noodles, which is often served on Sunday as part of a Sunday lunch (beef soup, fried potatoes, fried steak and lettuce). On feast days and holidays, there is often a choice of beef noodle soup or creamy mushroom soup. Pork is popular and common everywhere in Slovenia. Poultry is also often popular. There is a wide variety of meats in different parts of Slovenia. In White Carniola and the Slovenian Littoral, mutton and goat are eaten. On St. Martin's Day, people feast on roasted goose, duck, turkey, or chicken paired with red cabbage and mlinci. In Lower Carniola and Inner Carniola, they used to eat roasted dormouse and quail. Until the crayfish plague in the 1880s, the noble crayfish was a source of income and often on the menu in Lower Carniola and Inner Carniola.

Dandelion is popular as a salad ingredient in Slovenia and has been gathered in the fields for centuries. Even today, dandelion and potato salad is highly valued. Since it can be picked only for a short time in early spring, much is made of it. Families go on dandelion-picking expeditions, and pick enough for a whole week. In the Middle Ages, people ate acorns and other forest fruits, particularly in times of famine. Chestnuts were valued, and served as the basis for many dishes. Walnuts and hazelnuts are used in cakes and desserts. Wild strawberries, loganberries, blackberries, and bilberries were a rich source of vitamins. Mushrooms have always been popular, and Slovenians like picking and eating them. Honey was used to a considerable extent. Medenjaki, which come in different shapes, are honey cakes, which are most commonly heart-shaped and are often used as gifts.

== Protected foodstuffs and food products ==
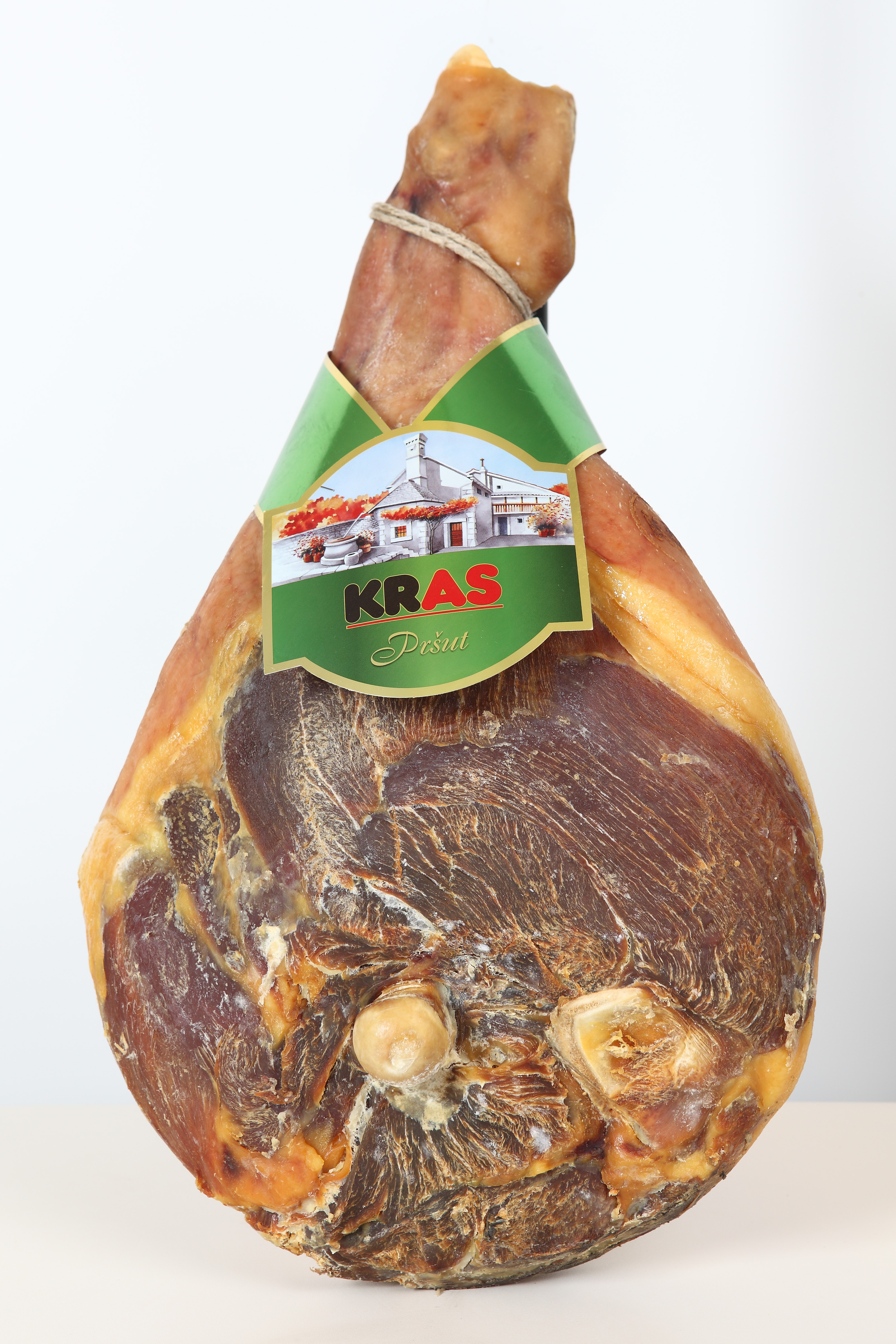
Prosciutto (pršut) from Karst

As of January 2023, 24 Slovenian foods and food products are protected at the European level:

- prleška tünka, a product from Prlekija in eastern Slovenia, made of minced lard and pork.
- Ptuj onion (ptujski lük), a sort of onion of a cordate shape, with red inspiration, whereas the edge has a more intensive purple hue.
- Extra virgin olive oil from the Slovenian Istria (ekstra deviško oljčno olje Slovenske Istre), a slightly bitter and spicy oil with a strong fruit aroma that contains a large amount of oleic acid and biphenols.
- Nanos cheese (nanoški sir), made of cow milk, hard, with small holes in the size of peas, a little sweet and spicy.
- Kočevje forest honey (kočevski gozdni med), produced in the wider Kočevje area.
- zgornjesavinjski želodec, an air-dried meat product from the Upper Savinja Valley, made of high-quality bacon and pork meat, stuffed in a pig stomach.
- šebreljski želodec, produced in the areas around Cerkno and Idrija, made of high-quality bacon and pork meat, stuffed in a pig stomach.
- Tolminc cheese (sir Tolminc), made of raw cows' milk in the area of Tolmin, tastes sweet and spicy.
- Karst prosciutto (kraški pršut), produced in the traditional way on the Karst Plateau in southwestern Slovenia.
- Karst cured neck meat (kraški zašink), a cylindrically shaped meat product from the cured pork neck meat in a casing.
- Bovec cheese (bovški sir), firm sheep cheese from area around Bovec near Soča river.
- Styria - Prekmurje pumpkin oil (štajersko-prekmursko bučno olje), dark-coloured pumpkin oil derived from pumpkin seed.
- Karst honey (kraški med), honey gathered exclusively on the Karst Plateau.
- Mohant, cows'-milk soft cheese with strong smell, piquant, sometimes bitter taste.
- Slovenian honey (slovenski med), honey gathered exclusively on the territory of Slovenia.
- Prekmurje ham (prekmurje ham), ham from Prekmurje.
- Salt from Piran (piranska sol), salt gathered manually from salt fields on the Slovenian coast near Piran.
- Carniolan sausage (kranjska klobasa), usually cooked sausage from pork and bacon.
- Istra Prosciutto** (istrski pršut), uncooked, unsmoked, and dry-cured ham from Istria.
- Styria Hop (štajerski hmelj) is a small genus of flowering plants in the family Cannabaceae, needed for beer production.
- Kamnik eggs (jajca izpod Kamniških planin), eggs from area under Kamnik Alps in central Slovenia.
- meat from boškarin cattle** (meso istrskega goveda - boškarina), meat from specific Istrian cattle.

** shared with Croatia

== Traditional Slovenian dishes ==
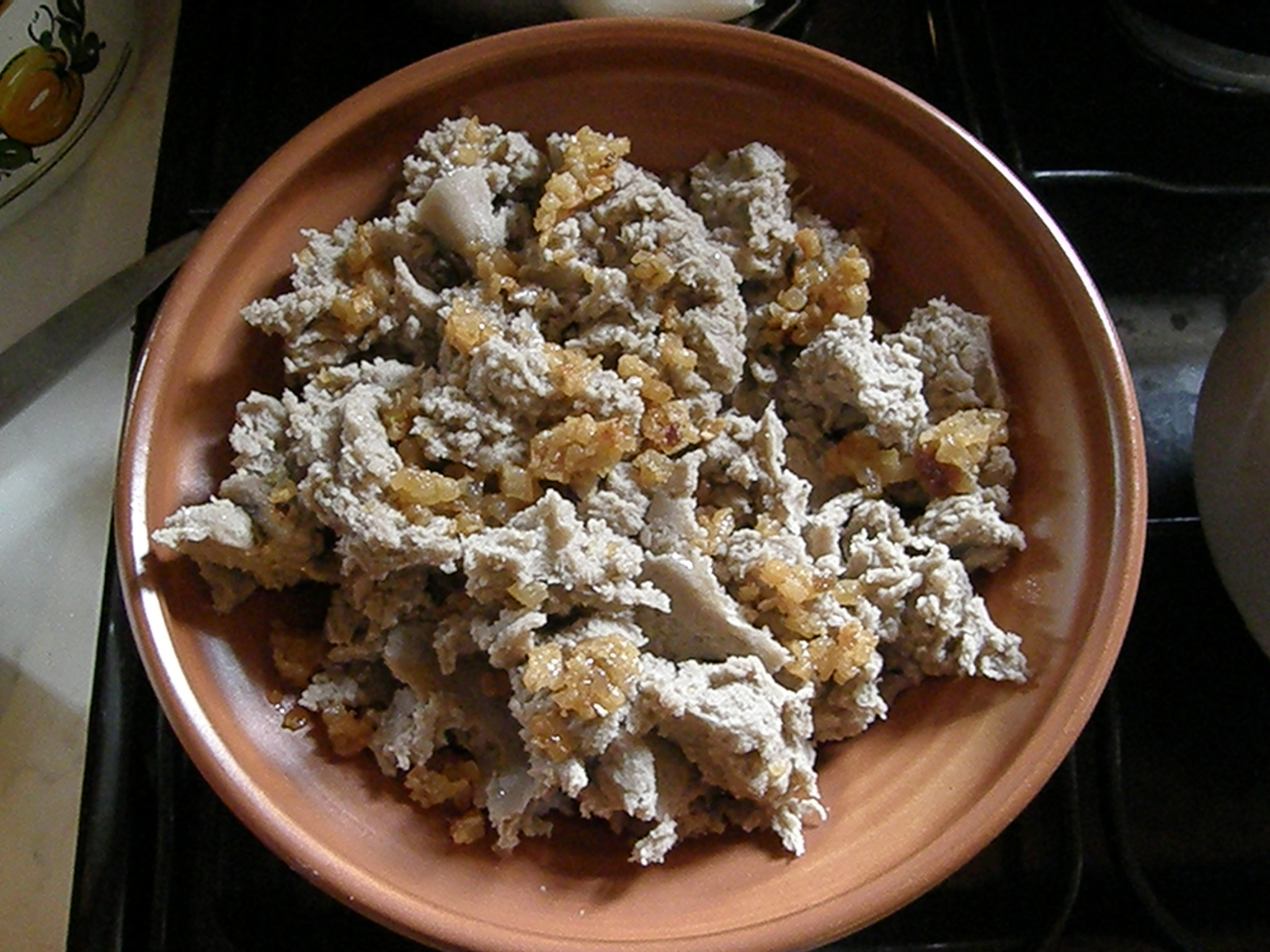
Ajdovi žganci with cracklings

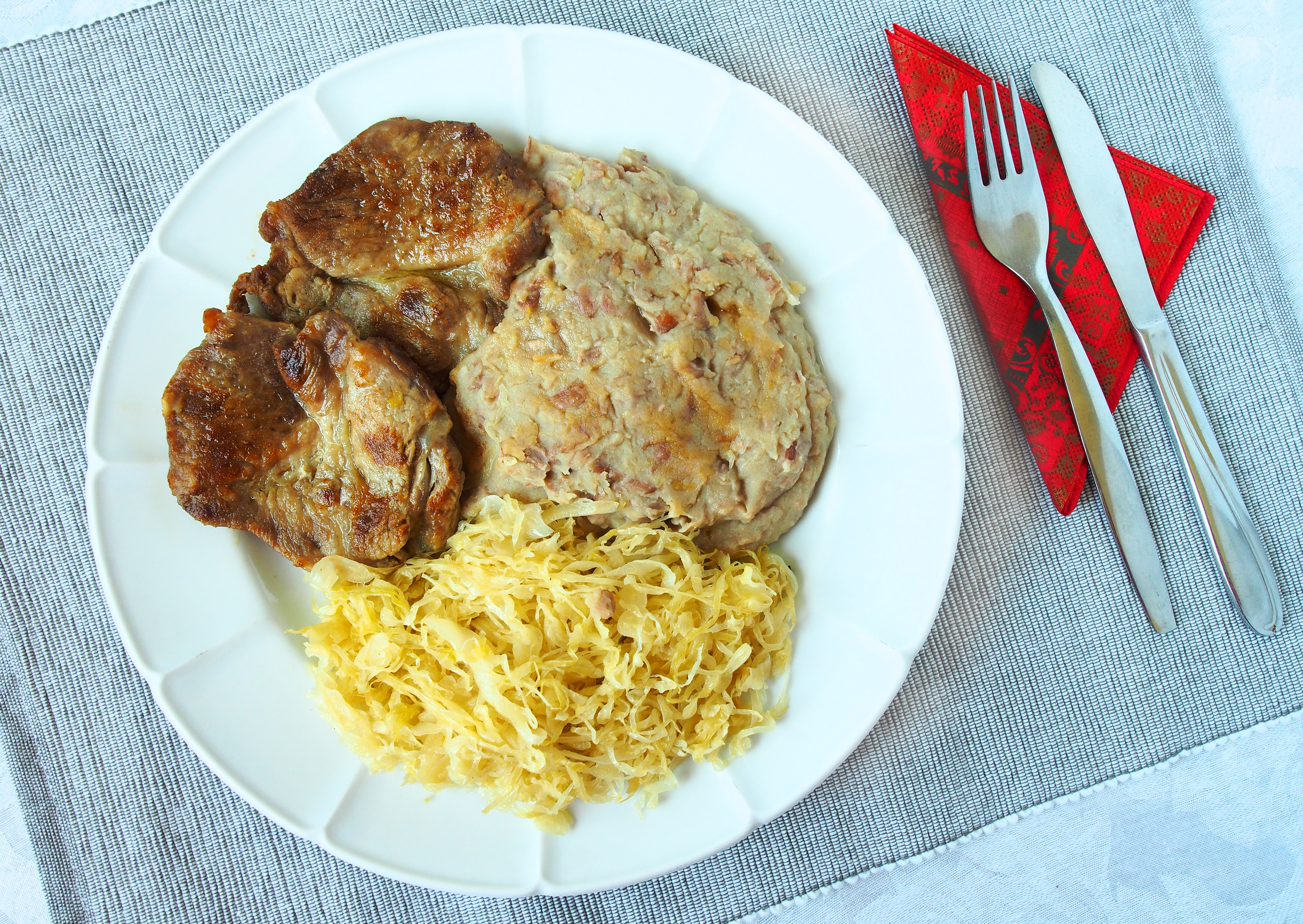
Matevž with roast meat and Sauerkraut

- Ajdovi žganci
- Belokranjska povitica
- Bujta repa
- Funšterc
- Kmečka pojedina
- Kranjska klobasa
- Matevž
- Mavželj
- Mežerli
- Mineštra (minestrone)
- Obara (stew)
- Pirh
- Potica (nut roll)
- Prekmurska gibanica
- Ričet
- Špehovka
- Vipavska jota

=== Soups and stews ===
- Bakalca
- Bobiči
- Bograč
- Jota, Vipavska kisla juha, Vipava sour soup
- Mineštra
- Prežganka is the Slovenian national soup, made of flour, caraway seeds and beaten eggs
- Šara
- Štajerska kisla juha is a sour soup that originates from Lower Styria. It is prepared at the feast of koline (pig slaughter) from the pork pettitoes and parts of the pig's head.

=== Vegetarian dishes ===
- Ajdovi žganci, žganci is a dish in Slovenian cuisine. It is similar to polenta, although prepared with finer grains. Balthasar Hacquet (1739–1815) mentions that žganci was served with sauerkraut in Upper Carniola.
- Aleluja
- Bezgovo cvrtje
- Čompe
- Fritaja (see also frittata) is a Croatian and Slovenian dish. Both are specialties in Istria. They are especially common in the springtime, as at that time there are many plants and vegetables such as wild asparagus, wild hops, herbs, chicory, tomatoes, young garlic sprouts and spices available to add to egg. Fritaje are many times prepared throughout the year with ham, mushrooms, sausages, bacon, white or red wine.
- Idrijski žlikrofi
- Jabolčna čežana
- Kaša is commonly eaten in Eastern Europe. At least a thousand years old, kasha is one of the oldest known dishes in Eastern European Slavic cuisine.
- Krapi
- Maslovnik
- Matevž
- Medla
- Mešta
- Močnik is made from cereals such as buckwheat, maize, wheat, millet, rye, or oats in either milk, cream or soured cream.
- Njoki
- Smojka
- Štruklji

=== Meat dishes ===
- Budelj
- Bujta repa
- Bunka (food)
- Furešna
- Jetrnice (liver sausage)
- Kranjska klobasa (Carniola sausage)
- Krvavice (black pudding)
- Mavta
- Mavželj
- Meso v tünki
- Mežerli
- Povijaka
- Prata
- Pršut (prosciutto)
- Šivanka
- Švacet
- Vampi (tripe)
- Zaseka
- Želodec (stomach)

=== Desserts and pastries ===
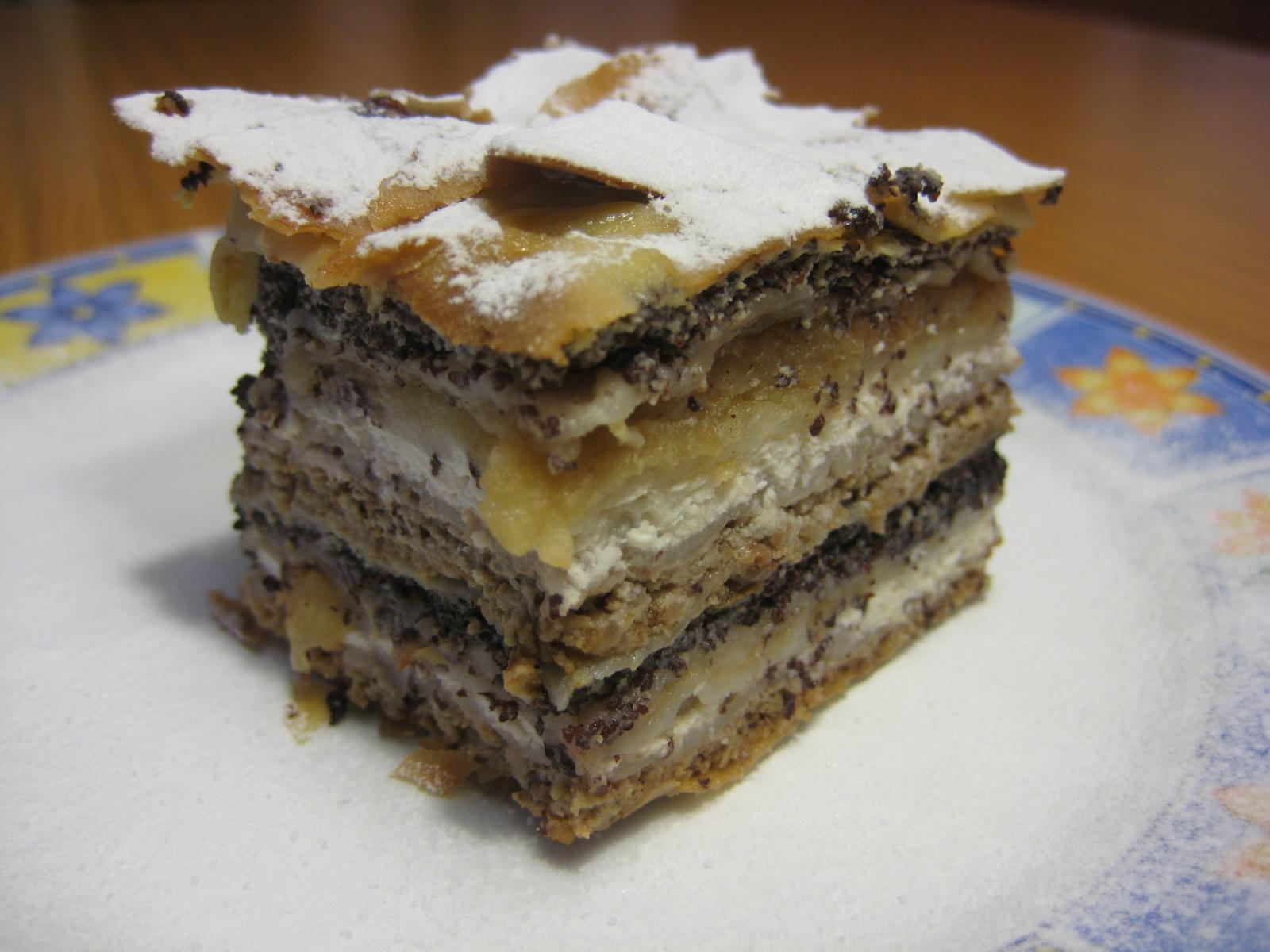
Prekmurska gibanica

- Bobi
- Buhteljni
- Cmoki
- Kremsnita
- Krhki flancati
- Krofi
- Kvasenica
- Miške
- Mlinci
- Ocvirkovica
- Pinca
- Pogača
- Posolanka
- Povitica or potica (nut roll)
- Prekmurska gibanica
- Šarkelj
- Škofjeloški kruhek
- Špehovka (bacon roll)
- Vrtanek
- Zlevanka

=== Drinks ===
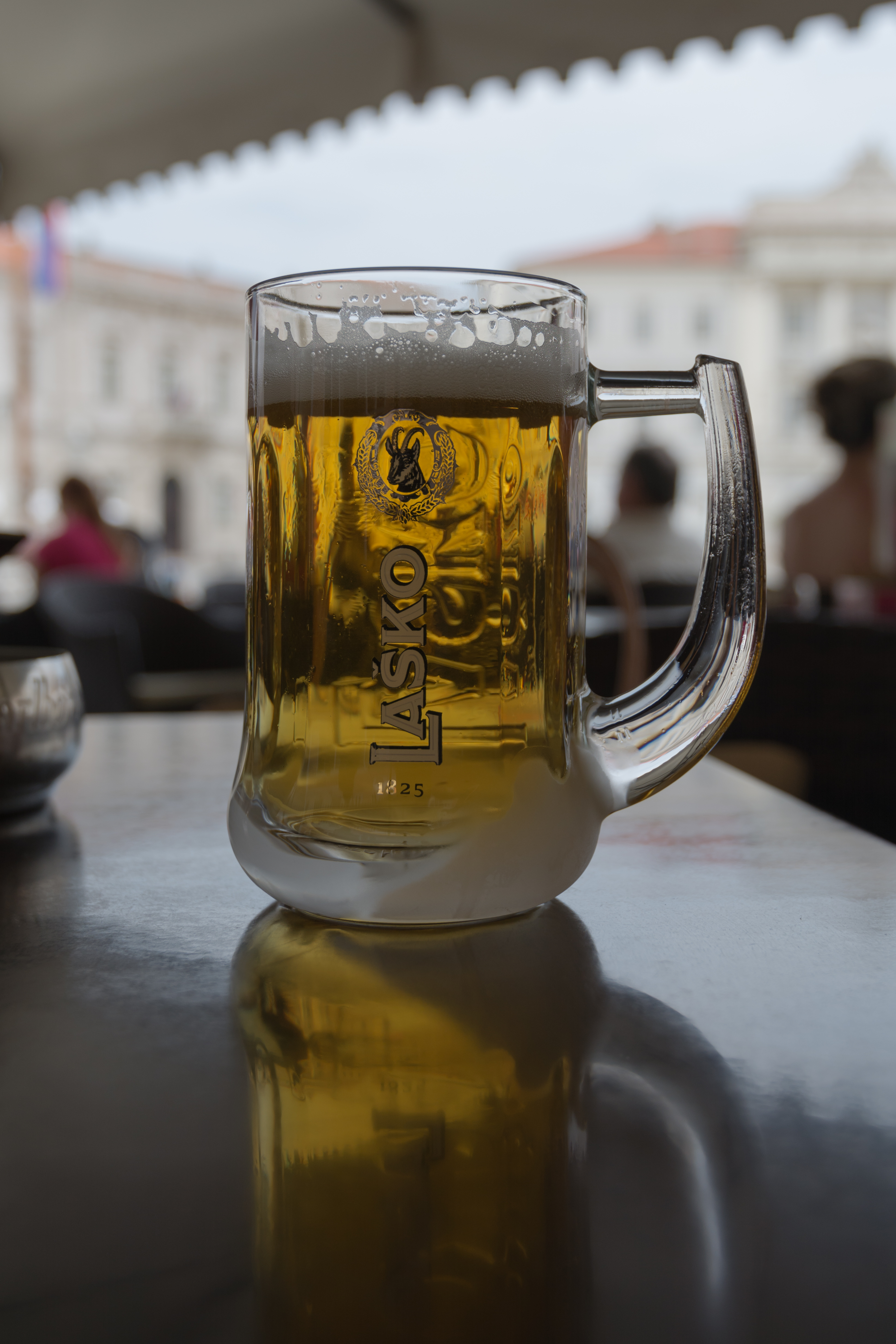
A Laško beer

- Brinjevec
- Borovničke
- Jabolčnik (apple wine)
- Češnjevec (cherry brandy)
- Cviček (Slovenian wine from Dolenjska region)
- Teran (Slovenian wine from Primorska region)
- Kislo mleko (sour milk)
- Šabesa
- Slivovka, slivovica
- Tolkovec
- Tropinovec
- Pinjenec (buttermilk)
- Union beer
- Laško/Zlatorog beer
