= List of sour soups =

Sour soup
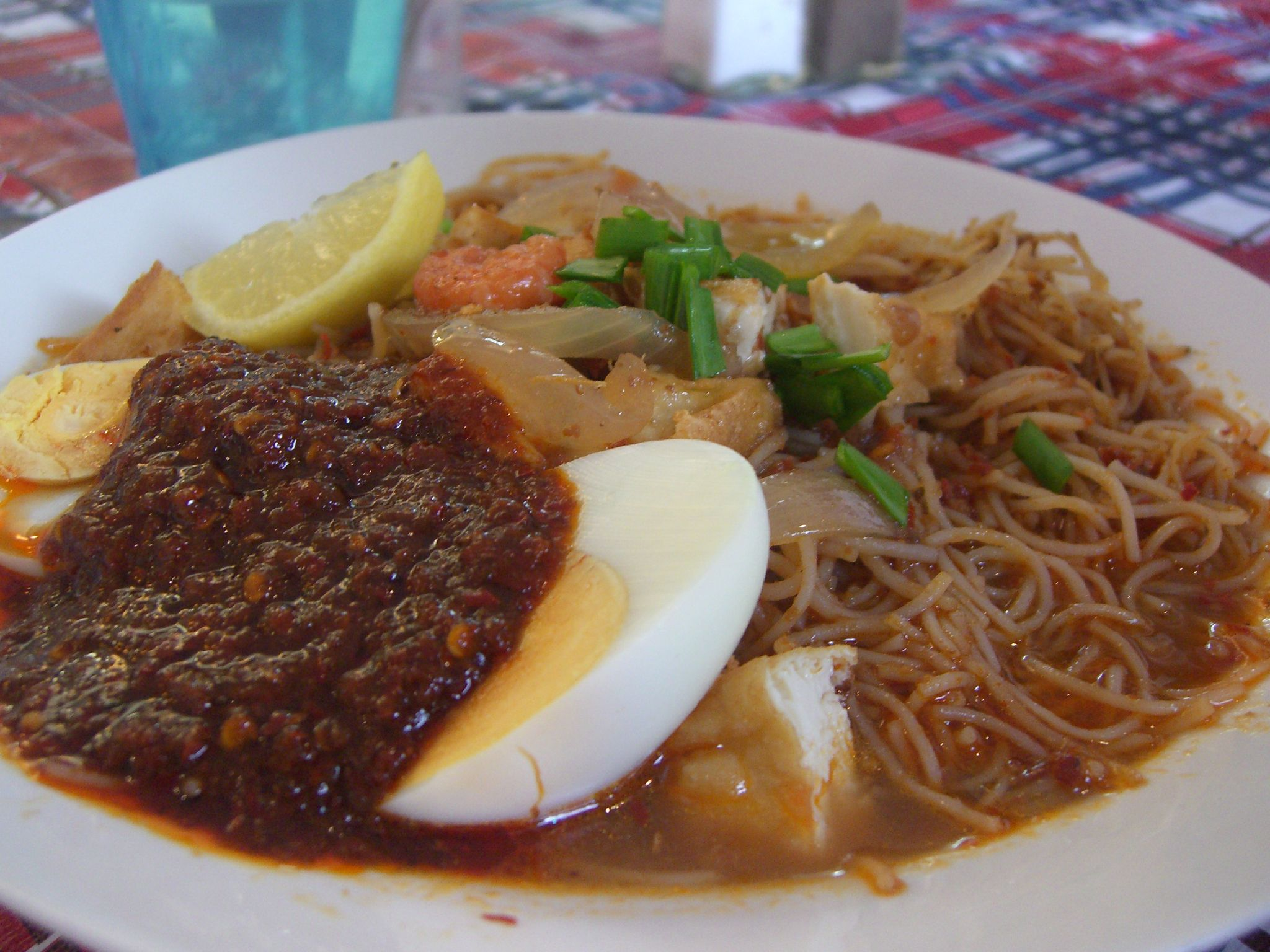
- Spicy sour soup flavoured with tamarind, dried shrimps, and salted soy beans
- Type: Soup
- Variations: Many

Various sour soups, named for their characteristic sour taste, are known in cuisines throughout East Asia, Southeast Asia, and Eastern Europe.

== Asian origin ==
- Samlar machu, a Khmer term for a category of sour soups.
- Canh chua (literally "sour soup") is a sour soup indigenous to the Mekong River region of southern Vietnam.
- Sinigang, Philippine sour soup
- Hot and sour soup
- Tom kha kai
- Tom yum
- Lemon rasam - an Indian sour soup made with lemon juices
- Dunt dalun chin-yei - drumstick sour soup (cuisine of Burma)
- Sayur asem
- Ikan kuah kuning - an Indonesia sour fish soup
- Sour soup fish - a Guizhou cuisine in southern China

== Slavic origin ==
- Beet borscht cooked in Eastern Europe has an appreciable sour taste due to the addition of sour beet (or fermented beet juice) or sour cream.
- Borschts without beets are generally sour.
- Kapusniak, Ukrainian and Polish soup made from sour cabbage (sauerkraut), millet and potatoes in meat broth.
- Sour shchi, a sour cabbage soup in Russian cuisine.
- Rassolnik, a traditional Russian soup made with pickled cucumbers.
- Sorrel soup
- Solyanka, a thick, spicy and sour soup in the Russian and Ukrainian cuisine.
- Okroshka, a cold Russian soup traditionally made with kvass.
- Sour rye soup, known as żur in Belarus and Poland, or kyselo in Slovakia and the Czech Republic.
- Jota (Slovenian cuisine)
- Styrian sour soup (Slovenian cuisine)
- Vipava sour soup (Slovenian cuisine)

== Romania and Moldova ==
- Borș, term from the historic region of Moldavia for sour soups or fermented wheat bran, essential ingredient to cook Ciorbă.

== See also ==
- Lime soup (Sopa de lima) from Mexico's Yucatan peninsula
- List of soups
