= Cotechino =

Type of Italian sausage

Cotechino (/ˌkoʊtɪˈkiːnoʊ, -teɪˈ-/, Italian: [koteˈkiːno]) is a large Italian pork sausage requiring slow cooking; usually it is simmered at low heat for several hours. Its name comes from cotica ('rind'), but it may take different names depending on its various locations of production. Traditionally, it is served with lentils or mashed potatoes. Lentils are the common choice on New Year's Eve, because their shape is said to resemble coins and thus to be a sign of prosperity in the coming year.

It is prepared by filling the natural casing with rind, pork meat (usually secondary cuts), and fat mixed with salt and spices; in industrial production, nitrites and nitrates are added as preservatives. Some similar sausages exist in the Italian cooking tradition, for example musetto and zampone which are made with different cuts and parts of the pig, musetto being made with meat taken from the pig's muzzle, and zampone, which is encased in the lower part of a pig's trotter, partly boned and with the rind stitched together at the top.

== Varieties of cotechino ==
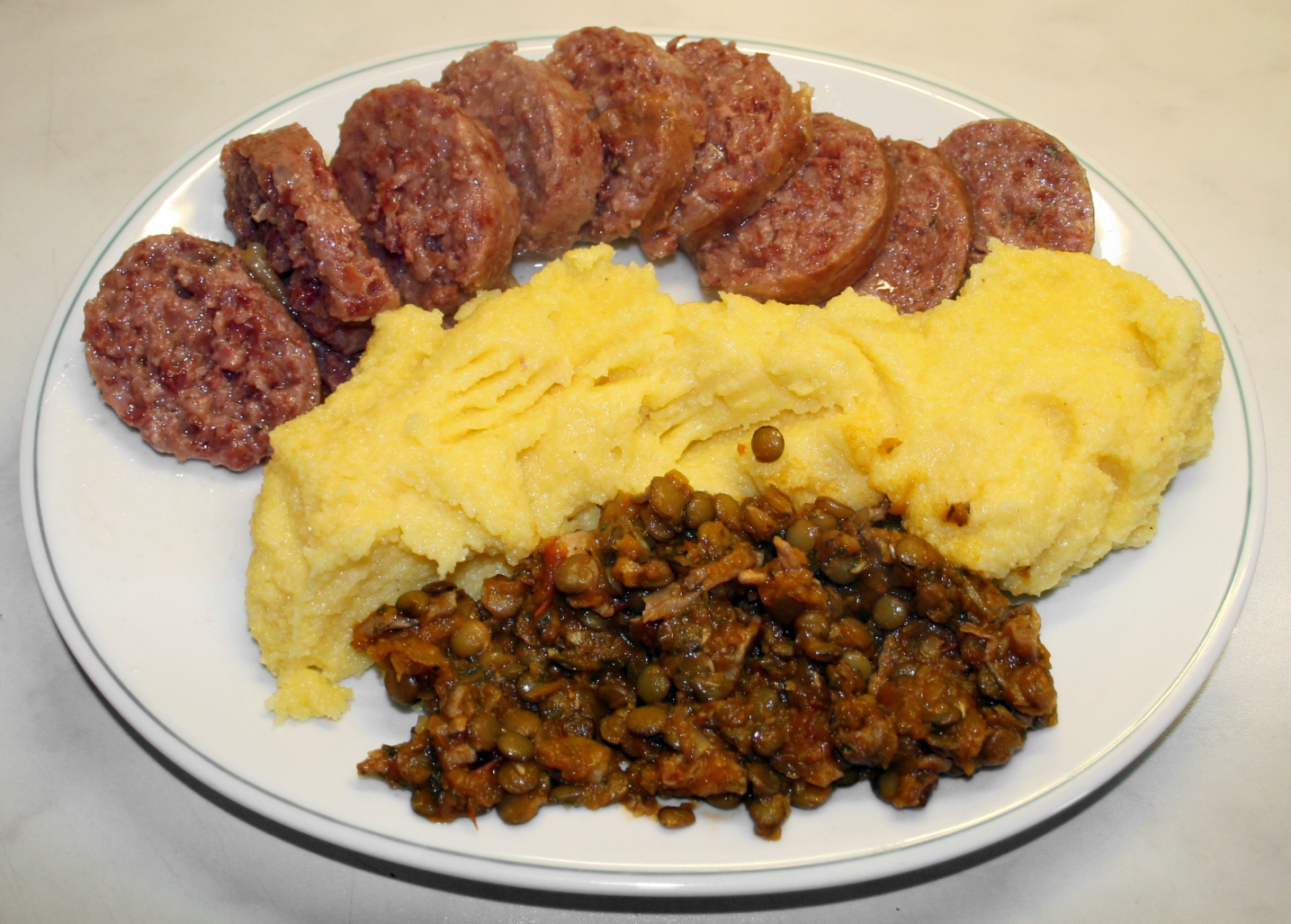
Boiled cotechino Modena (top) served with polenta and lentils (bottom)

Cotechino Modena has PGI status, meaning its recipe and production are preserved under Italian and European law.

Six Italian regions have so far declared cotechino a traditional food:

- Emilia-Romagna: see above (cotechino Modena)
- Lombardy: cotechino (Cremona, Bergamo, Mantua, Pavia)
- Molise: cotechino
- Trentino: pork cotechino
- Veneto/Friuli-Venezia Giulia: recognises seven different products: coeghin nostran of Padua; coessin co la lengua of Vicenza, coessin of Vicenza, coessin of Val Leogra, coessin in onto of Vicenza, coessin co lo sgrugno, cotechino di puledro and musetto of Friuli-Venezia Giulia
- Irpinia: cotechino pezzente

== See also ==
- Cotechino Modena
