= Kung Pao chicken =

Spicy stir-fried dish

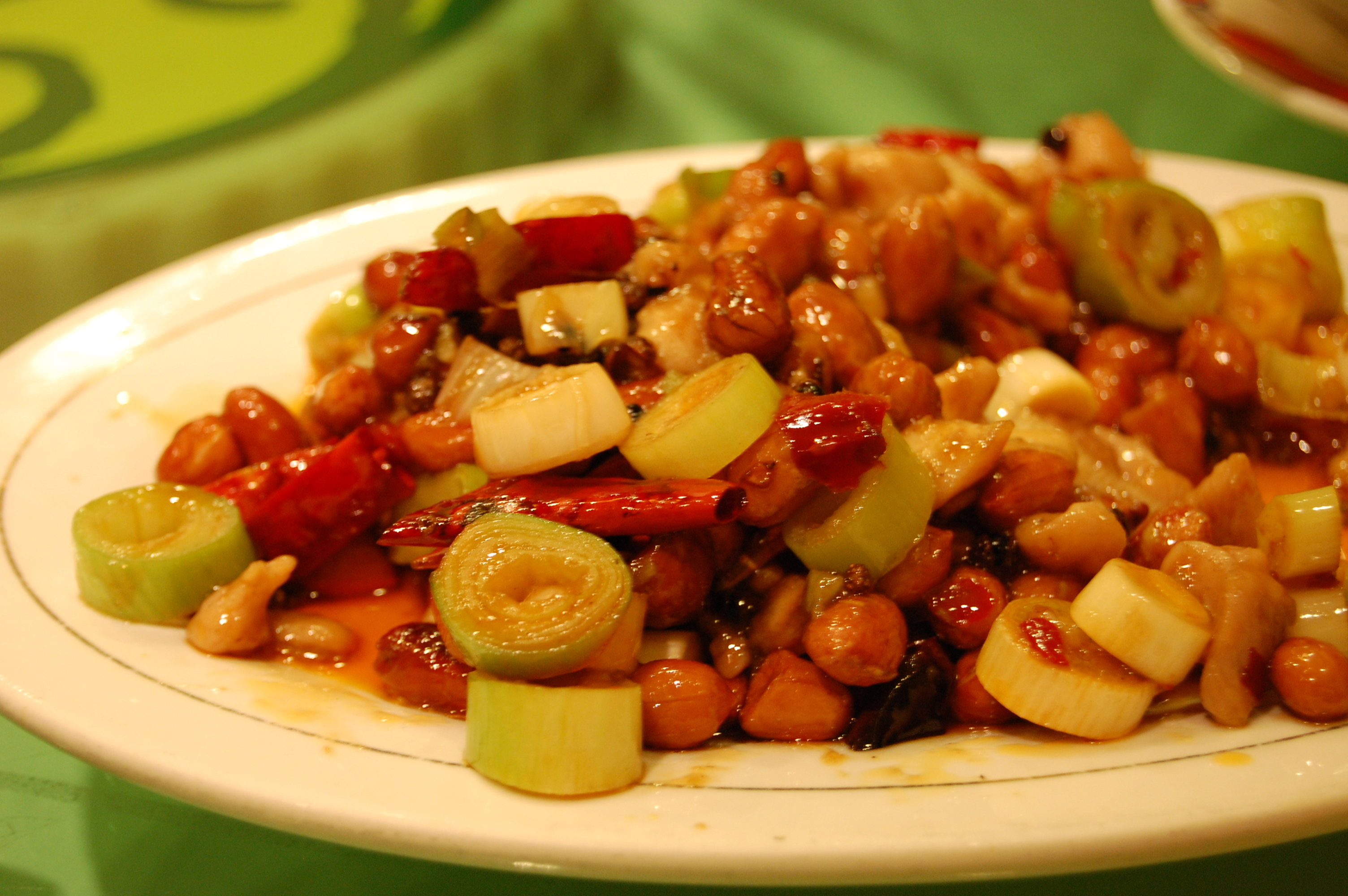
- A Sichuan version of Kung Pao chicken
- Type: Stir-fry
- Course: Main
- Place of origin: China
- Region or state: Sichuan
- Associated cuisine: Sichuan cuisine
- Invented: Mid-to-late 19th century
- Main ingredients: Cubed boneless chicken, chili peppers, peanuts
- Variations: Guizhou, Anhui

Chinese name
- Traditional Chinese: 宮保雞丁
- Simplified Chinese: 宫保鸡丁
- Literal meaning: Palace Guardian chicken cubes
Transcriptions
Standard Mandarin
- Hanyu Pinyin: Gōngbǎo jīdīng
- Bopomofo: ㄍㄨㄥ ㄅㄠˇ ㄐㄧ ㄉㄧㄥ
- Wade–Giles: Kung^{1}-pao^{3} chi^{1}-ting^{1}
- Tongyong Pinyin: Gong-bǎo ji-ding
- IPA: [kʊ́ŋ.pàʊ tɕí.tíŋ]
Yue: Cantonese
- Yale Romanization: gūng bóu gāi dīng
- Jyutping: gung1 bou2 gai1 ding1
- IPA: [kʊŋ˥ pɔw˧˥ kɐj˥ tɪŋ˥]

Kung Pao chicken (Chinese: 宮保雞丁; pinyin: Gōngbǎo jīdīng; Wade–Giles: Kung^{1}-pao^{3} chi^{1}-ting^{1}; Zhuyin Fuhao: ㄍㄨㄥ ㄅㄠˇ ㄐㄧ ㄉㄧㄥ), also transcribed Gong Bao or Kung Po, is a spicy, stir-fried Chinese dish made with cubes of cooked chicken, peanuts, vegetables and chili peppers, and Sichuan peppercorns. From its origins in Sichuan cuisine, the dish's popularity has spread throughout China, spawning a number of regional variations—some of which are less spicy than the classic version.

== History ==
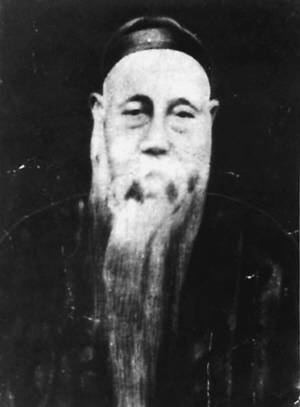
Ding Baozhen, the Qing dynasty official in Sichuan after whom the dish is named

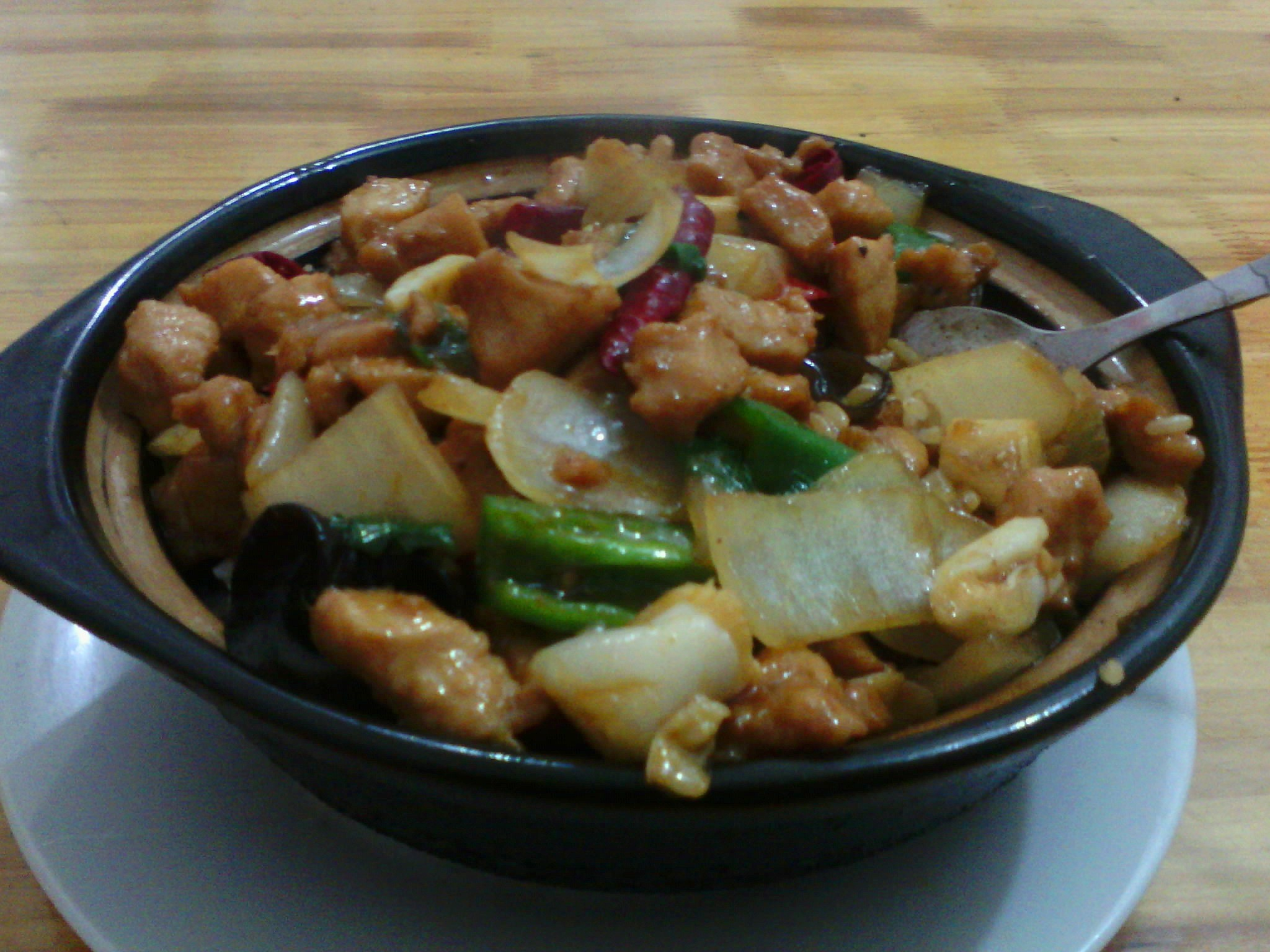
The Anhui version of Kung Pao chicken

=== Qing dynasty ===
The dish's origins are uncertain, but it is believed to be named after Ding Baozhen (1820–1886), a late Qing dynasty official and governor of Sichuan Province. His title was Taizi Shaobao, which is one of the Gongbao (Chinese: 宮保; pinyin: Gōngbǎo; Wade–Giles: Kung^{1}-pao^{3}; lit. 'Palace Guardian(s)'). The name Kung Pao chicken is derived from this title, while the use of the character 丁 dīng in the name of the dish is a pun on his surname Dīng, a moderately common Chinese surname that can also be read to mean "small cube" (like the cubes the chicken is diced into for the dish).

=== Cultural Revolution ===
During the Cultural Revolution, the dish's name became politically incorrect because of its association with the imperial system. The dish was renamed "spicy chicken" (simplified Chinese: 糊辣鸡丁; traditional Chinese: 糊辣雞丁; pinyin: húlà jīdīng) by Maoists until its political rehabilitation in the 1980s under Deng Xiaoping's reforms.

== Versions ==
=== Sichuan version ===
The original Sichuan version uses chicken as its primary ingredient. In this original version, diced chicken is typically mixed with a prepared marinade. Shaoxing wine is used to enhance flavor in the marinade. The wok is seasoned and then chili peppers and Sichuan peppercorns are flash-fried to add fragrance to the oil. In Sichuan, or when preparing Sichuan-style Kung Pao chicken, usually Sichuan-style chili peppers such as facing heaven pepper or seven stars pepper (Chinese: 七星椒; pinyin: qīxīngjiāo) are used. Smaller, thinner Sichuanese varieties may also be used. Sichuan peppercorns are then added; while Kung Pao chicken does not belong to the numbing-spicy mala flavor profile (Chinese: 麻辣味型; pinyin: málà wèixíng), a small amount of fresh toasted Sichuan peppercorns are traditionally used to balance the heat of the chilis. Then the chicken is stir-fried and chopped welsh onion, along with peanuts, are added. Kung Pao chicken starts off with fresh, moist, unroasted peanuts. These are often used instead of their pre-roasted versions. The peanuts are dropped into the hot oil at the bottom of the wok, then deep-fried until golden brown before the other ingredients are added.

Variants exist that use other meats in place of chicken, such as "Kung Pao shrimp" (Chinese: 宮保蝦; pinyin: Gōngbǎo xiā) and "Kung Pao frog legs" (Chinese: 宮保田雞; pinyin: Gōngbǎo tiánjī).

=== Guizhou version ===
The neighboring province of Guizhou, southeast of Sichuan, has a variant of Kung Pao chicken based on the ciba fermented chili paste (Chinese: 糍粑辣椒 cíbā làjiāo) of Guizhou cuisine. Some literature even lists Guizhou as the origin of this dish. Like the Sichuan version, the dish features marinated cubes of chicken; while the Guizhou marinade is largely the same as the Sichuan version's, the chicken cubes are larger and typically skin-on. Further, rather than flash-frying whole peppers in oil before stir-frying, a large quantity of the ciba chili paste is fried in the wok until the oil is stained. The chicken is then stir-fried in the resulting sauce with garlic, ginger, and green garlic or green onion.

=== Western versions ===
Versions commonly found in the West, called Kung Pao chicken, Kung Po, or just chicken chili and garlic, consist of diced, marinated chicken, stir-fried with orange or orange juice, ginger, garlic, chicken broth, sugar, cooking oil, corn starch, and salt and pepper to taste. Many other vegetables may be added, such as onion, bell pepper or carrots. The dish often includes or is garnished with whole roasted peanuts. Instead of chicken, Western variations sometimes substitute other proteins such as pork, duck, fish, shrimp, or tofu.

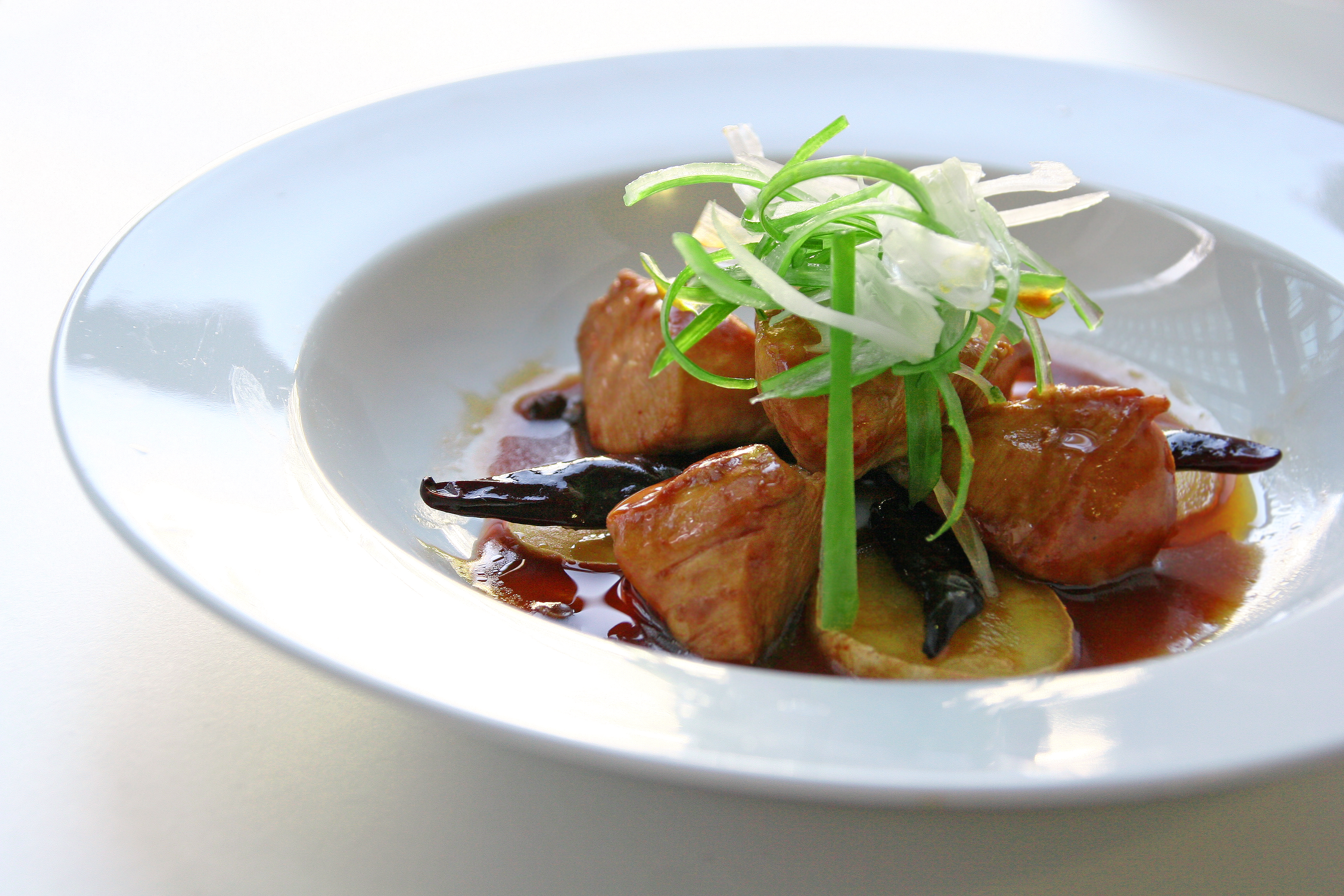
Another version of Kung Pao chicken

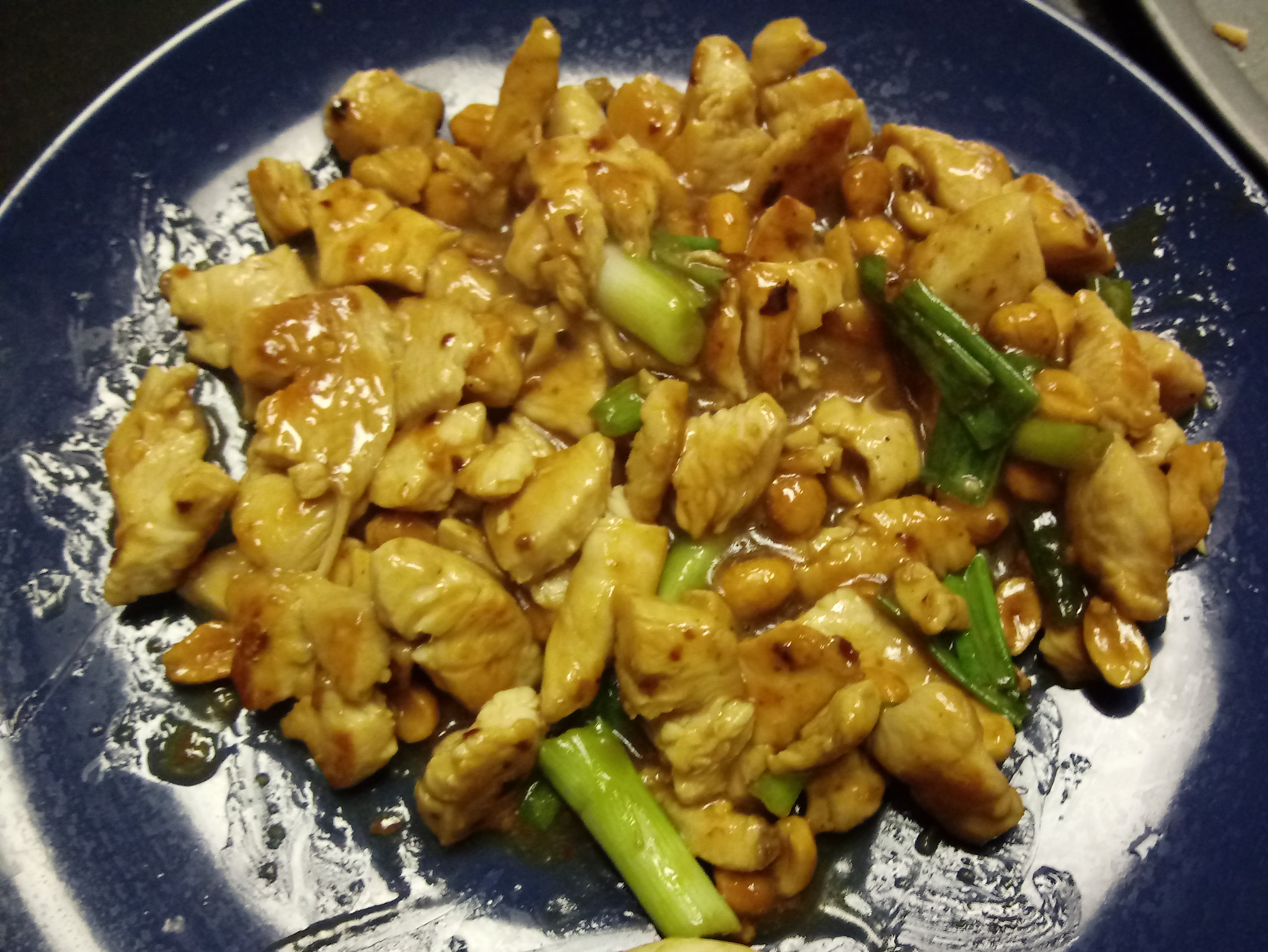
A plate of homestyle Kung Pao chicken in Fresno, California

== See also ==
- List of chicken dishes
- List of Chinese dishes
- gunpowder chicken, a very similar dish whose name may be inspired by the sound of this dish's name
