= Siwawa =

Chinese dish

A siwawa (Chinese: 丝娃娃; pinyin: sī wá wá "swaddled baby", also known as "Guiyang spring rolls" or "silk doll") is a Chinese dish, native to and a local specialty of Guizhou, consisting of a paper-thin glutinous rice pancake that is small enough to fit easily in one's palm, wrapped around fillings of julienned fresh, fermented, or stir-fried vegetables such as shredded cucumber, pickled turnip, fried soybeans, crushed chilis, shredded kelp, shredded potato, pickled radish, mung bean sprouts, fishmint, pickled fiddleheads, and jueba bracken roots. Some vendors include cui shao (Chinese: 脆哨) as a filling. The dish traditionally is a common street food or hawker food but eventually started to appear at events such as weddings. It is one of the most well-known of Guizhou's traditional snack foods but is also eaten as a formal meal.

Spicy and sour-flavoured sauces known as zhanshui (Chinese: 蘸水) are commonly incorporated into wraps or used as dipping sauces. One popular sauce recipe includes a combination of ingredients such as stock, dried chili pepper flakes, and sesame oil.

The dish's name, "baby in swaddling clothes," is derived from its appearance. Strips of ingredients are wrapped in a rice pancake, resembling a wrapped infant. It also resembles an uncooked egg roll and is sometimes considered "a member of the spring roll family".

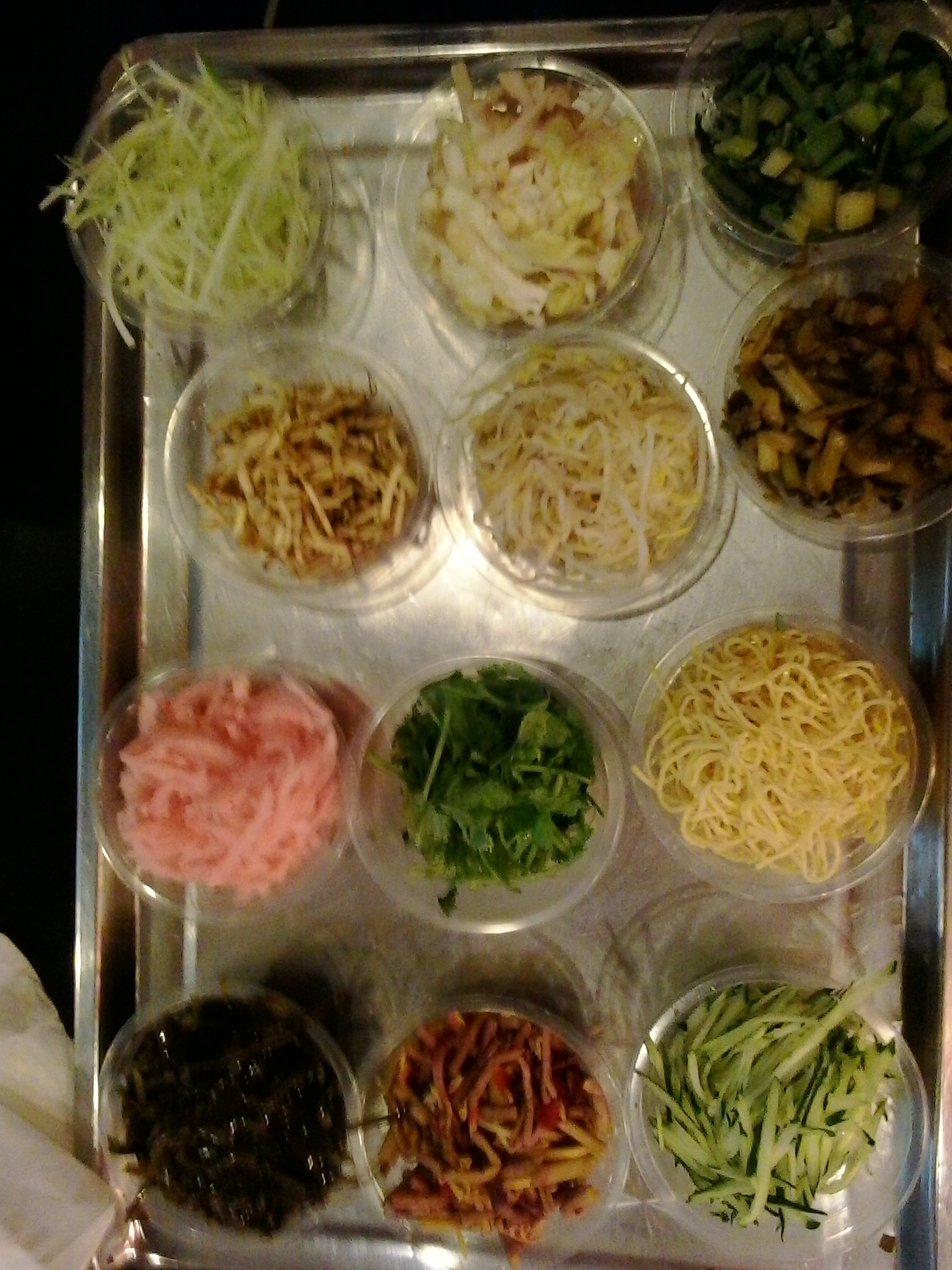
Ingredients for siwawa

== See also ==
- Guizhou cuisine
