= Bujta repa =

Slovenian pork dish

Bujta repa (sour turnip hot pot or pork with pickled grated turnips) is a Slovene national dish. It was mostly made in Prekmurje, the northeastern part of Slovenia. The expression bujta comes from the verb form bujti (to kill). The dish was originally relished in winter at pig slaughter or koline.

It was prepared from fatty parts of the pig's head, neck, and skin, and sour turnips. Bujta repa needed to be fatty and well-larded. There was a rule that no steam should be seen rising from the dish. The colder the greasier, they believed. Now this custom is out of practice since less lard is used.

== See also ==
- Slovenian cuisine
