= Guizhou cuisine =

Chinese cuisine

- Traditional Chinese: 貴州菜
- Simplified Chinese: 贵州菜
Transcriptions
Standard Mandarin
- Hanyu Pinyin: Guìzhōu cài

Qian cuisine
- Chinese: 黔菜
Transcriptions
Standard Mandarin
- Hanyu Pinyin: Qián cài

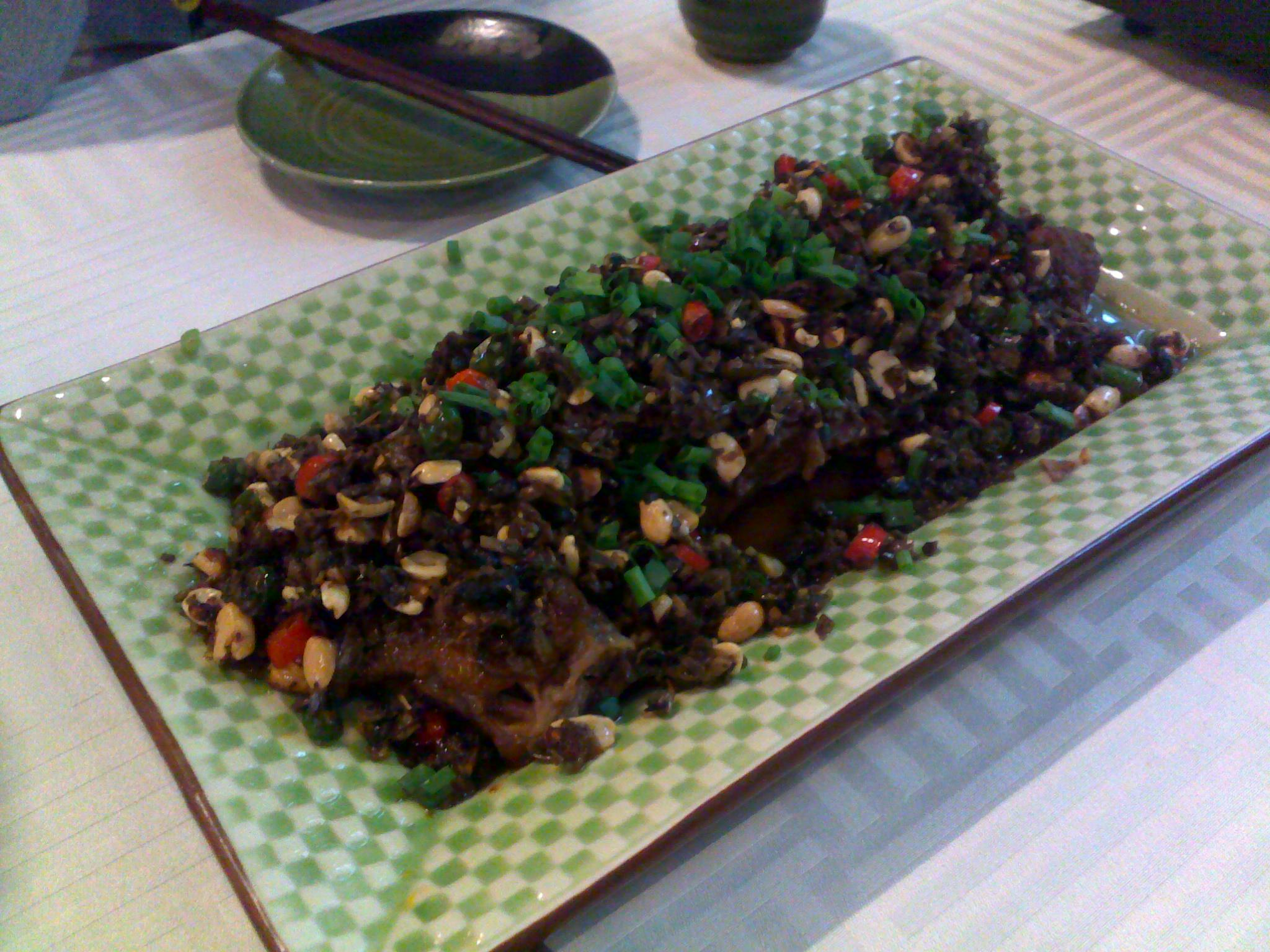

Guizhou cuisine, or Qian cuisine, consists of cooking traditions and dishes from Guizhou Province in southwestern China. Guizhou cuisine shares many features with Sichuan cuisine and Hunan cuisine, especially in bringing the sensation of spiciness and pungency. What makes Guizhou cuisine unique is the emphasis of a mixed sour-and-spicy taste, as compared to the numbing-and-hot sensation (麻辣; má là) featured in Sichuan cuisine and the dry-hot taste (干辣; 乾辣; gān là) featured in Hunan cuisine. There is an ancient local saying, "Without eating a sour dish for three days, people will stagger with weak legs". The saying reflects how Guizhou people love local dishes with a sour taste. The combination of sour and spicy flavours is also found in Shaanxi cuisine. Guizhou cuisine differs from Shaanxi cuisine in that it lacks the emphasis on the salty taste, which is a common trait found in most northern Chinese cuisines. In addition, the unique sourness featured in Guizhou cuisine comes from the local tradition of fermenting vegetables or grains, and not from using vinegar products.

Guizhou cuisine comprises many local varieties and dishes from ethnic minorities, such as the Miao people. Some famous local cuisines are represented by large cities like Guiyang, Zunyi, and Liupanshui.

Guizhou cuisine has matured since the beginning of the Ming dynasty.

== Features ==
Guizhou is famous for producing high-quality Chinese liquor, baijiu. One of the most famous and expensive baijiu in China, Maotai, is from Guizhou. Guizhou cuisine also features dishes specially cooked to match the flavour of locally produced liquor, such as preserved vegetables and steamed cured meat.

Guizhou cuisine features various pickled vegetable, or yancai (腌菜; 醃菜; yān cài). The pickled vegetables bring the sour sensation. Fresh vegetables are dried without exposure to sunlight after being cleaned. Afterwards, they are salted and sealed in containers for four or five days to allow proper fermentation. Pickled cabbage and radish are served as side dishes, commonly with wheat and rice noodle dishes.

The sour soup broth (酸汤; 酸湯; suān tāng), representative of Guizhou cuisine with unique sourness, is a cooking heritage from the Miao people. It is the secret to create the famous Guizhou dish 'fish in sour soup'. The broth is normally made from the fermentation of rice, rice wine, wild tomatoes, red pepper, garlic and ginger.

Spicy dipping sauce (蘸水; zhàn shuǐ) is crucial in daily dining of Guizhou people. It is made by mixing chili pepper, garlic, ginger, green scallion, sesame oil or soy sauce, according to personal preference. One unique ingredient used in Guizhou dipping sauce is Houttuynia (折耳根/鱼腥草; 折耳根/魚腥草; zhéěrgēn/yúxīng cǎo), which is loved by local people but not commonly accepted by other Chinese with its distinct taste.

Various types of spiciness in Guizhou cuisine come from the art of using chili peppers in different ways by locals. Hu-la (糊辣; hú là) is created by heat-drying crushed chili pepper. Ciba-la (糍粑辣; cíbā là) refers to both the uncooked mashed chili pepper paste and the chili sauce by simmering the paste in oil. Zao-la (糟辣; zāo là) is made by preserving minced chili pepper with ginger and garlic. Laoguo-la (烙锅辣; 烙鍋辣; lào guō là) is spice-flavored chili flakes. The renowned chili sauce brand Lao Gan Ma originated in Guizhou.

== Notable dishes ==
Name	Chinese	Pinyin	Picture	Notes
fried rice with egg and zao-la	糟辣蛋炒饭			Fried rice with egg with zao-la chili sauce
guai-lu fried rice	怪噜炒饭	/guài lū chǎo fàn/		free-style fried rice with Houttuynia, Chinese bacon, pickled vegetables and other vegetables of choice
sour soup fish	酸汤鱼			Not to be confused with 酸菜鱼, a famous Chongqing Dish.
Guizhou-style spicy chicken/laziji	辣子鸡	/là zǐ jī/		Slightly different from the Sichuan styled version.
stir-fried Houttuynia with Chinese bacon	腊肉炒折耳根	/suān tāng yú/		Chinese bacon/腊肉 can be replaced with Weining ham/威宁火腿, a type of locally produced smoked premium ham.
crispy whole fish with zao-la	糟辣鱼	/zāo là yú/		
braised trotter in brown sauce				
stir-fried Qingyan tofu	青岩豆腐	/qīng yán dòu fǔ/		Pronounced as /qīng ái dòu fǔ/ in local Guiyang accent, significantly different from standard pinyin.
Siwawa (Guiyang spring roll)	丝娃娃	/sī wá wá/		
love tofu	恋爱豆腐裹 (also written as “恋爱豆腐果”)	/liàn ài dòu fǔ guǒ/		baked tofu stuffed with chili
changwang noodles	肠旺面	/cháng wàng miàn/		egg noodles with chili oil, pig's intestine and blood
cui-shao	脆哨	/cuì shào/		Deep fried diced pork, but very different comparing to cracklings. Usually marinated with soy sauce, vinegar and sugar or sweet wine. Can be added to siwawa, changwang noodles and many more. Also as a casual snack.
