= Prežganka =

Slovenian national soup

- Type: Soup
- Place of origin: Slovenia
- Main ingredients: Flour, caraway seeds, eggs

Prežganka ("browned" soup with eggs) is the Slovenian national soup made of flour, caraway seeds and beaten eggs. The brown color comes from browning the flour in oil or butter. Instead of the flour, breadcrumbs can be used.

Prežganka is a traditional dish from Upper Carniola region.

== See also ==
- List of soups
- Slovenian cuisine
