= Styrian sour soup =

Slovenian cuisine

- Type: Sour soup
- Place of origin: Slovenia
- Region or state: Lower Styria
- Main ingredients: Pork parts, potatoes, onions, garlic, marjoram, thyme, parsley, black pepper, salt, apple or wine vinegar

Styrian sour soup (Slovene: Štajerska kisla juha) is a sour soup that originates from Lower Styria.

Styrian sour soup was a staple at koline, the biggest secular festival, and become a synonymous with late-night parties. It was typically served at nuptials after midnight.

== See also ==
- Slovenian cuisine
