= Funšterc =

Slovenian national culinary dish

- Alternative names: Knapovsko sonce, knapovska torta
- Type: Omelette
- Place of origin: Slovenia
- Main ingredients: Flour, water, eggs

Funšterc (egg omelette) is a Slovenian national dish also known as knapovsko sonce (coalminer's sun) or knapovska torta (coalminer's cake) or šmorn. It is a traditional dish from the Central Sava Valley. In the past it was especially popular among coal miners and their families due to its basic ingredient - egg. Egg belonged to non-standard dishes because of low living standard of the population. The omelette must have been thick and round, but also tender and puffy. It was yellow like the sun, which the coal miners could not see while working underground. They took funšterc into coal pits and ate it on their break, but only at special days.

The dish is prepared by mixing white flour with water, eggs and salt. This mixture is then poured into a baking tin and baked.

== Variations ==
- In the spring dandelion or spring lettuce was added.
- Sometimes beans and potatoes were added.
- With elderberry flowers and apples.

== See also ==
- Slovenian cuisine
