= Mavželj =

Mavželj (minced pork filling in net) is a soup eaten mostly in Slovene Carinthia and in Upper Carniola. It is made by cooking a pig's head in a soup. Pieces of brain and meat are then taken from the head and formed into balls wrapped in a "net". In the past, the preparation of these balls, known as mavželjni, was much more popular than today, and potters would make special earthen baking moduls to help make them. The dish was mainly eaten on holidays, serving the mavželjni in the soup.

== See also ==
- Kransky
- List of pork dishes
- Slovenian cuisine
