= Štruklji =

Traditional Slovene dish

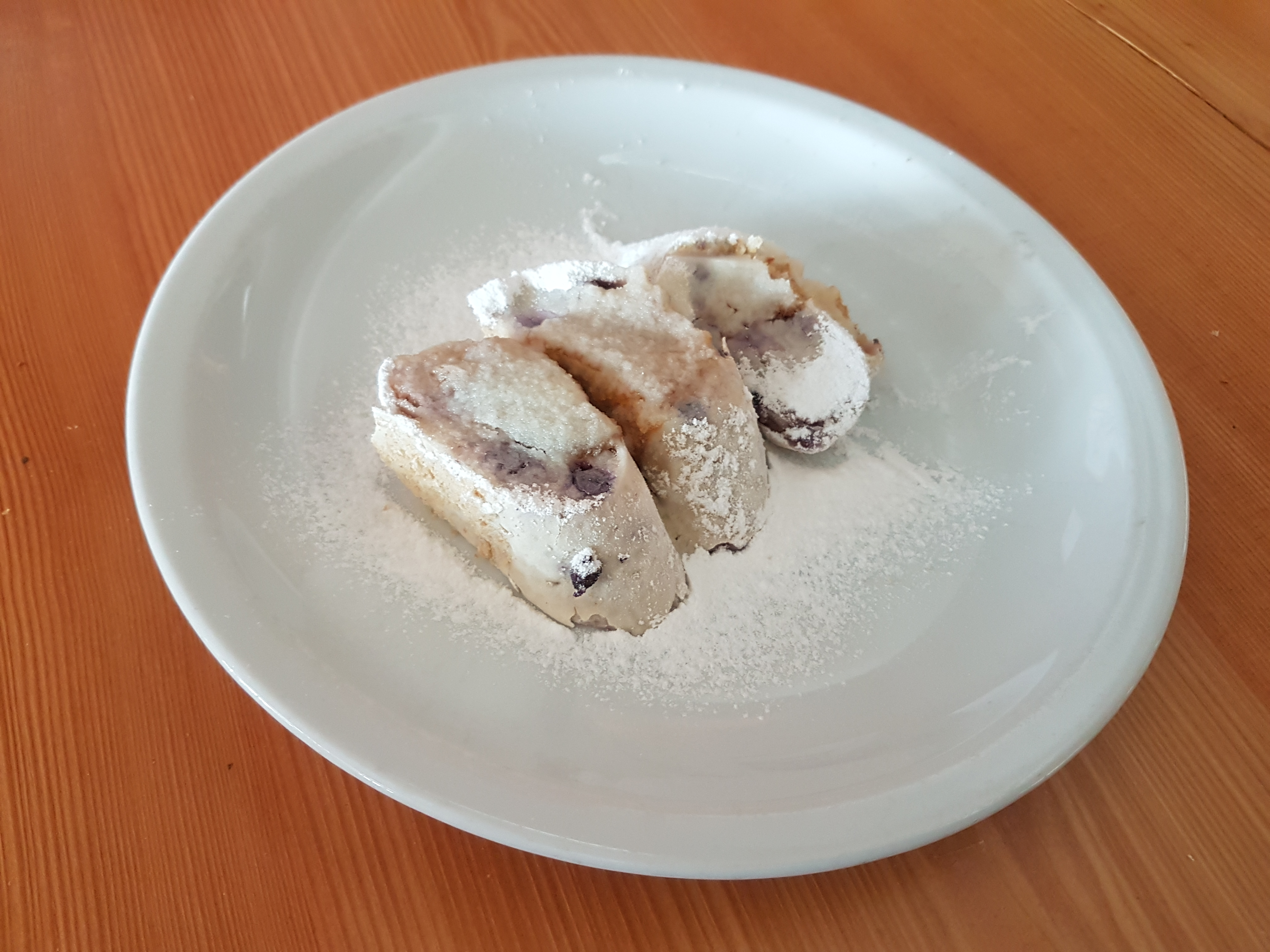
- Štruklji
- Type: pastry
- Course: side dish or dessert
- Place of origin: Slovenia
- Serving temperature: warm or cold
- Main ingredients: dough (buckwheat, wheat), filling (apple, walnut, poppy seed)
- Variations: sweet or savoury

Štruklji is a traditional Slovene dish, composed of dough and various types of filling. The dish comes in the form of rolled dumplings, which can be steamed, boiled, or baked, and can have a wide range of fillings. Štruklji has been traditionally reserved for special occasions, but is now one of the most characteristic everyday dishes in households all across Slovenia. It is closely related to Zagorski štrukli, a traditional Croatian dish.

== History ==
The first recorded preparation of štruklji is said to be in 1589, when a chef at a manor in Graz wrote down the recipe for cooked štruklji with tarragon filling. It became a festive dish for the urban middle class in the 17th century, and spread to rural households two centuries later. It was incorporated into everyday cuisine at the beginning of the 20th century.

Variants:

- Kobariški štruklji
- Bovški Krafi

== Ingredients and preparation ==
The most common ingredients of the pastry are flour – most commonly wheat or buckwheat – mixed with egg, oil, warm water, and salt. These are then mixed together and the dough rolled out into a thin layer. The filling can be either sweet or savoury; the most common fillings are apple, walnut, poppy seed, ricotta, or tarragon. The filling is then spread onto the sheet of dough, and the dough then rolled up.

Alternatively, štruklji can be made by mixing ricotta into the ingredients above and cooking the dough.

Štruklji can be steamed, boiled in water, fried, or baked. Štruklji is often served with either meat and gravy, or a sauce of breadcrumbs.
