= Cotechino Modena =

Type of Italian sausage

Cotechino Modena or cotechino di Modena (Italian: [koteˈkiːno di ˈmɔːdena]; spelled cotecchino or coteghino in some major dialects, but not in Italian) is a sausage made with pork, fatback, and pork rind recognised as a product with a protected geographical indication (PGI), originating in the city of Modena, Italy. Zampone Modena or zampone is closely related and also obtained PDO status.

Cotechino dates back to around 1511 to Gavello in Mirandola, where, whilst besieged, the people had to find a way to preserve meat and use the less tender cuts, so they made cotechino. Mirandola developed its own specialty enveloped in a hollowed out pig's trotter, named zampone.

By the 18th century it had become more popular than the yellowish sausage which was available at the time, and in the 19th century entered mass production in and around the area.

Cotechino is often served with lentils alongside polenta or mashed potatoes, especially around New Year.

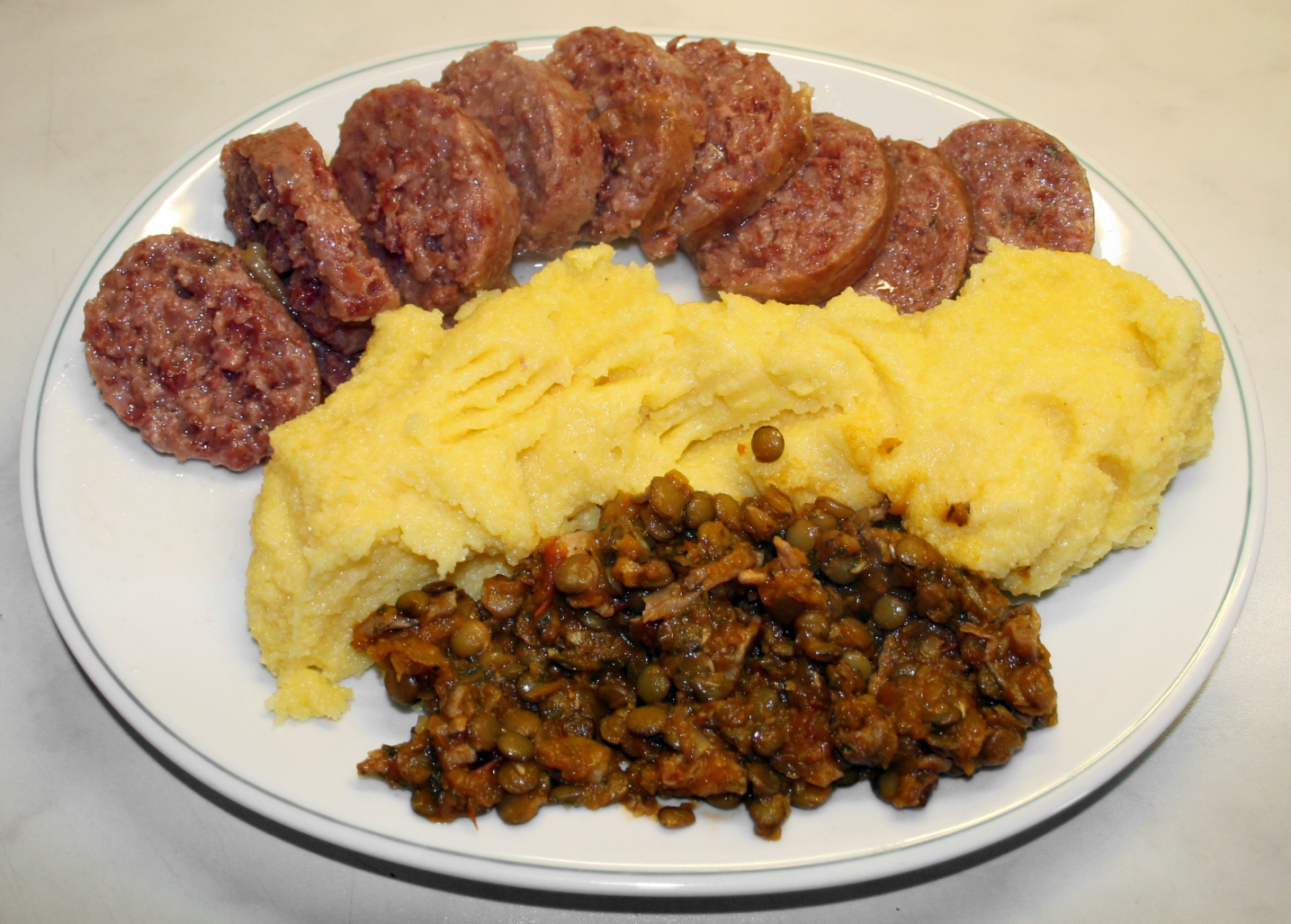
Boiled cotechino Modena (top) served with polenta and lentils (bottom)

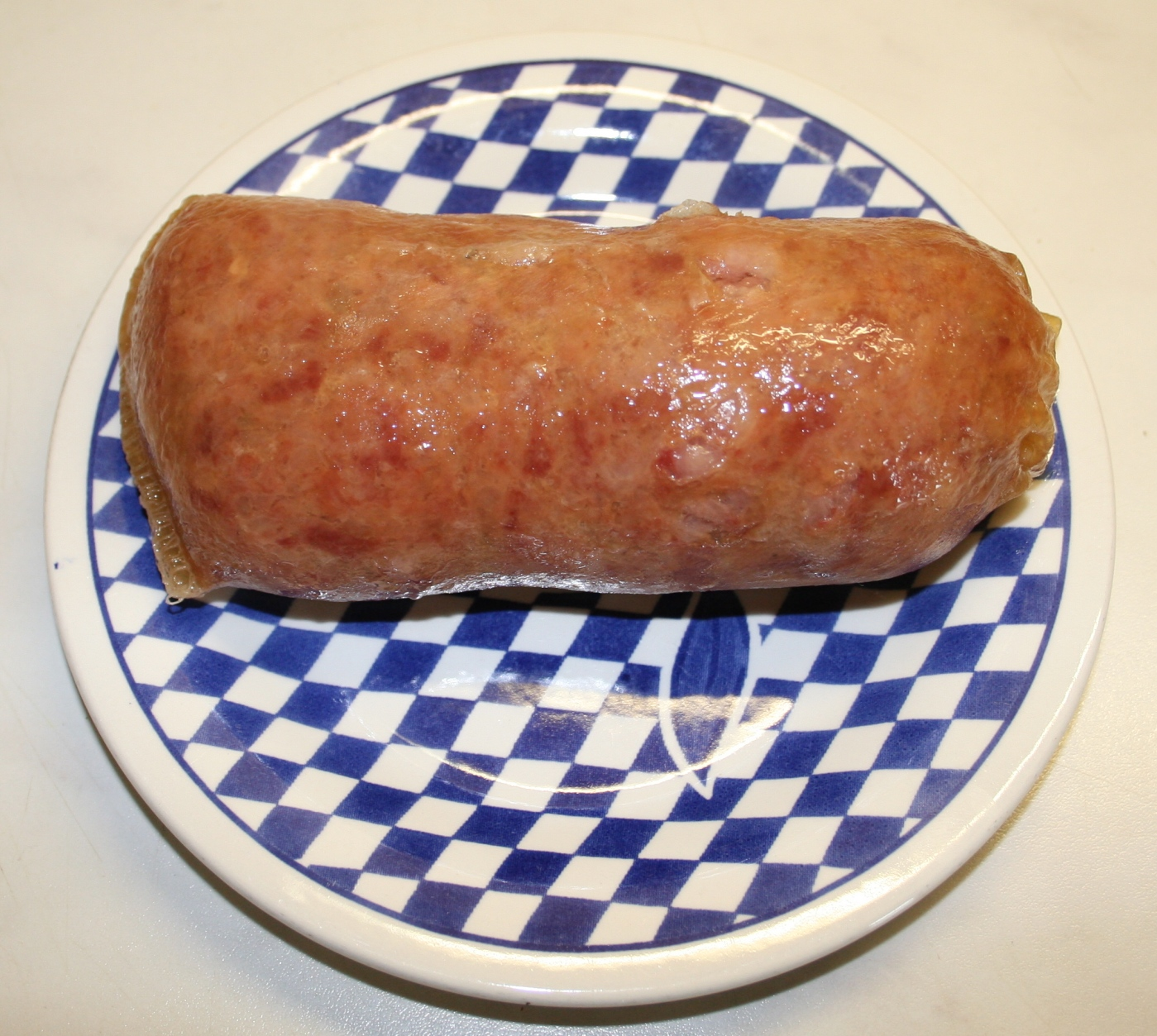
Cooked cotechino Modena

== See also ==
- Cotechino
