= Idrijski žlikrofi =

Slovenian dumplings originating from Idrijski

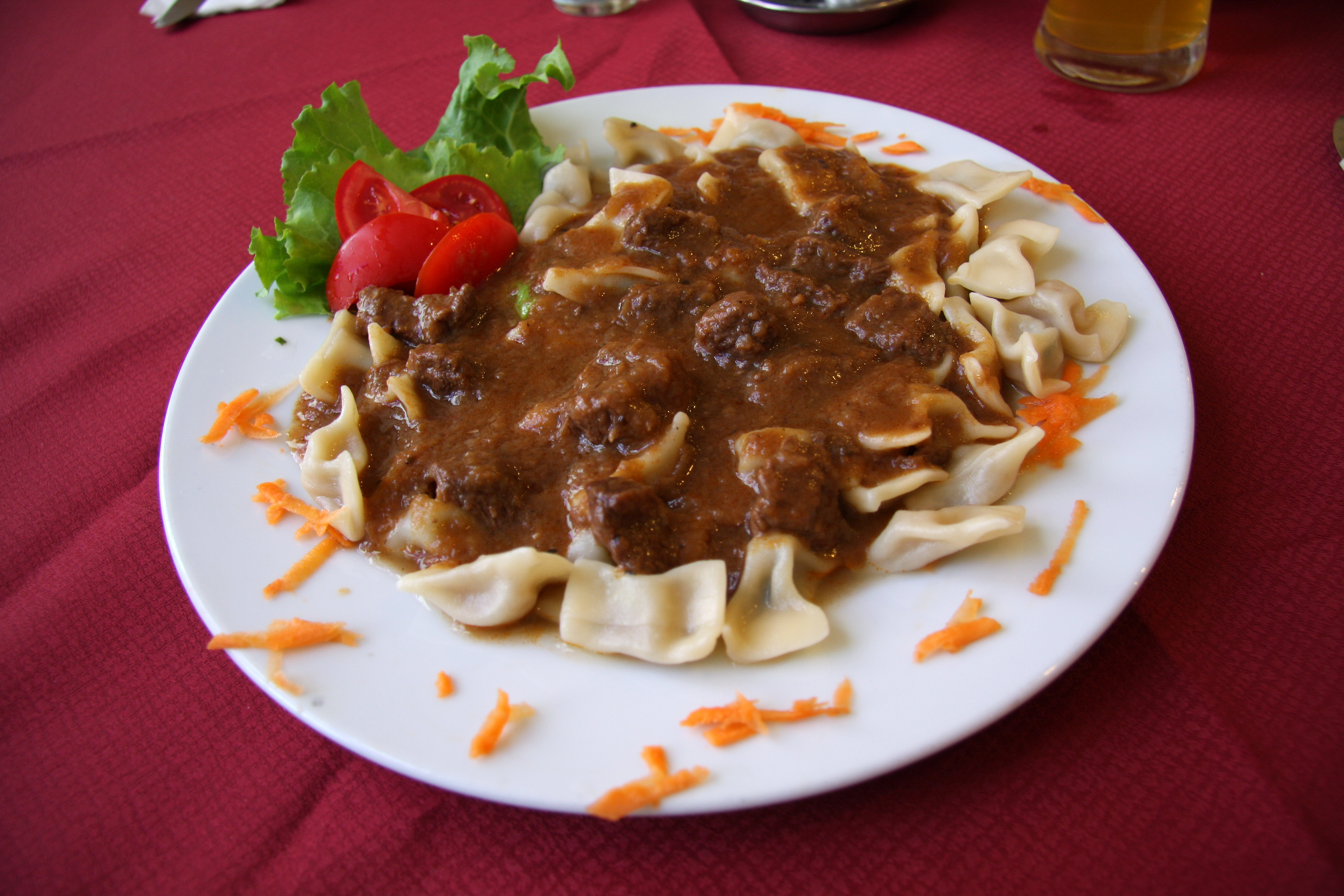
- Type: Dumplings
- Place of origin: Slovenia
- Region or state: Idrija
- Main ingredients: Flour, eggs, potatoes, lard
- Other information: TSG

Idrijski žlikrofi are traditional Slovenian dumplings that originate from Idrija. They are made from dough with potato filling and are often served either as a side dish to meat or on their own, in which case they are topped with breadcrumbs. The recipe dates back to the mid 19th century and remains one of the most popular Slovenian dishes. Žlikrofi were awarded an EU protected geographical status in 2010 as Traditional Speciality Guaranteed, the first Slovenian dish to do so.

== Protection regime ==
- Traditional specialities guaranteed (TSG) in the European Union
