= Vrtanek =

Slovenian braided bread

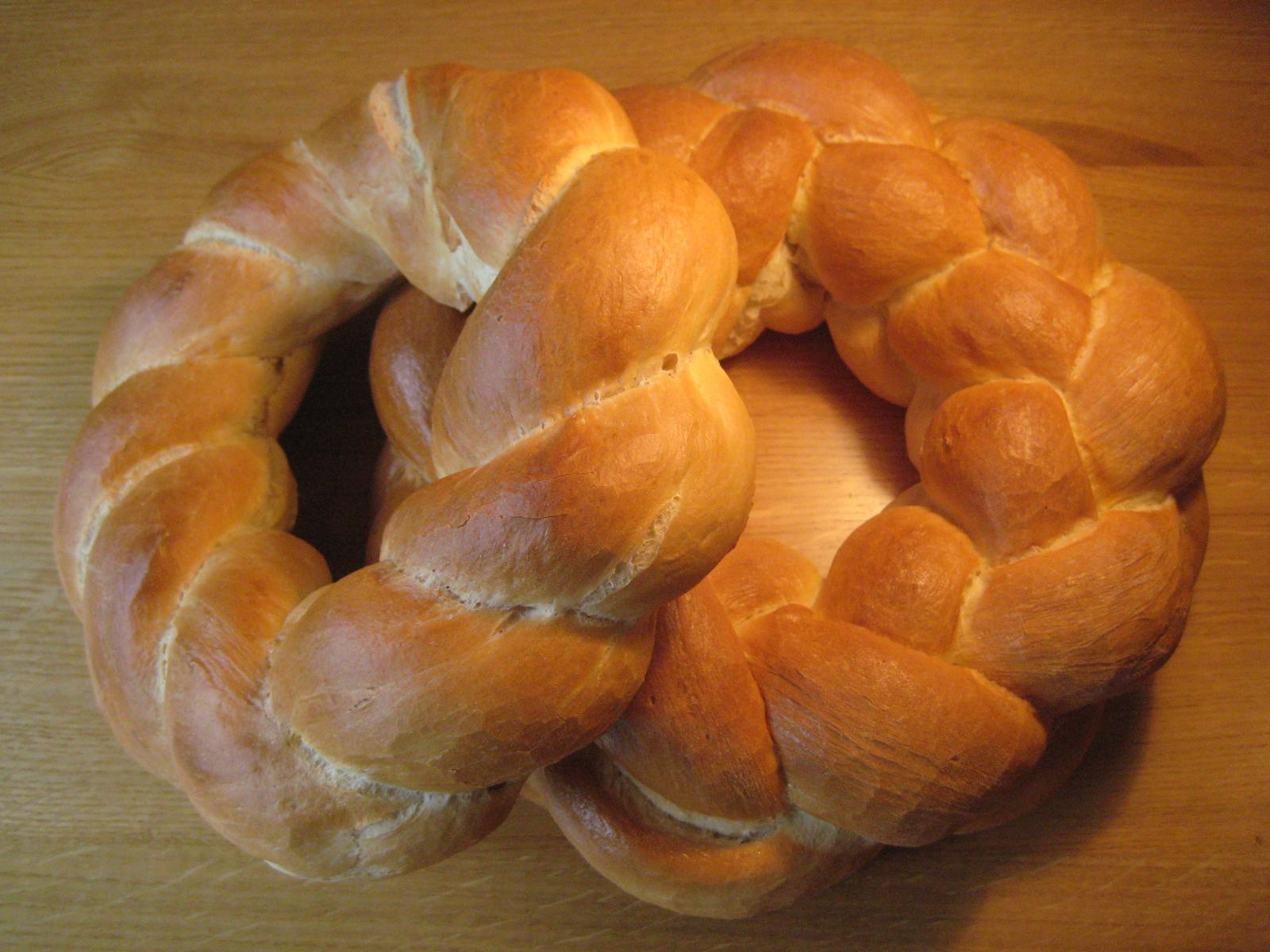
- Alternative names: Perec
- Type: Plaited bread
- Place of origin: Slovenia

Vrtanek (also called perec) is a type of bread associated with Prekmurje, Slovenia. According to Protestant church reports dating to 1627 it was local custom for members of parish to give vrtanek as a gift for christenings and weddings. It was a typical feast food made for celebrations of the harvest. The same braided, round loaf is recorded as torta panis in 1698. In modern times it's a festive loaf appropriate for many types of celebrations, public events and large receptions.
