= Matevž =

Potato and bean purée from Slovenia

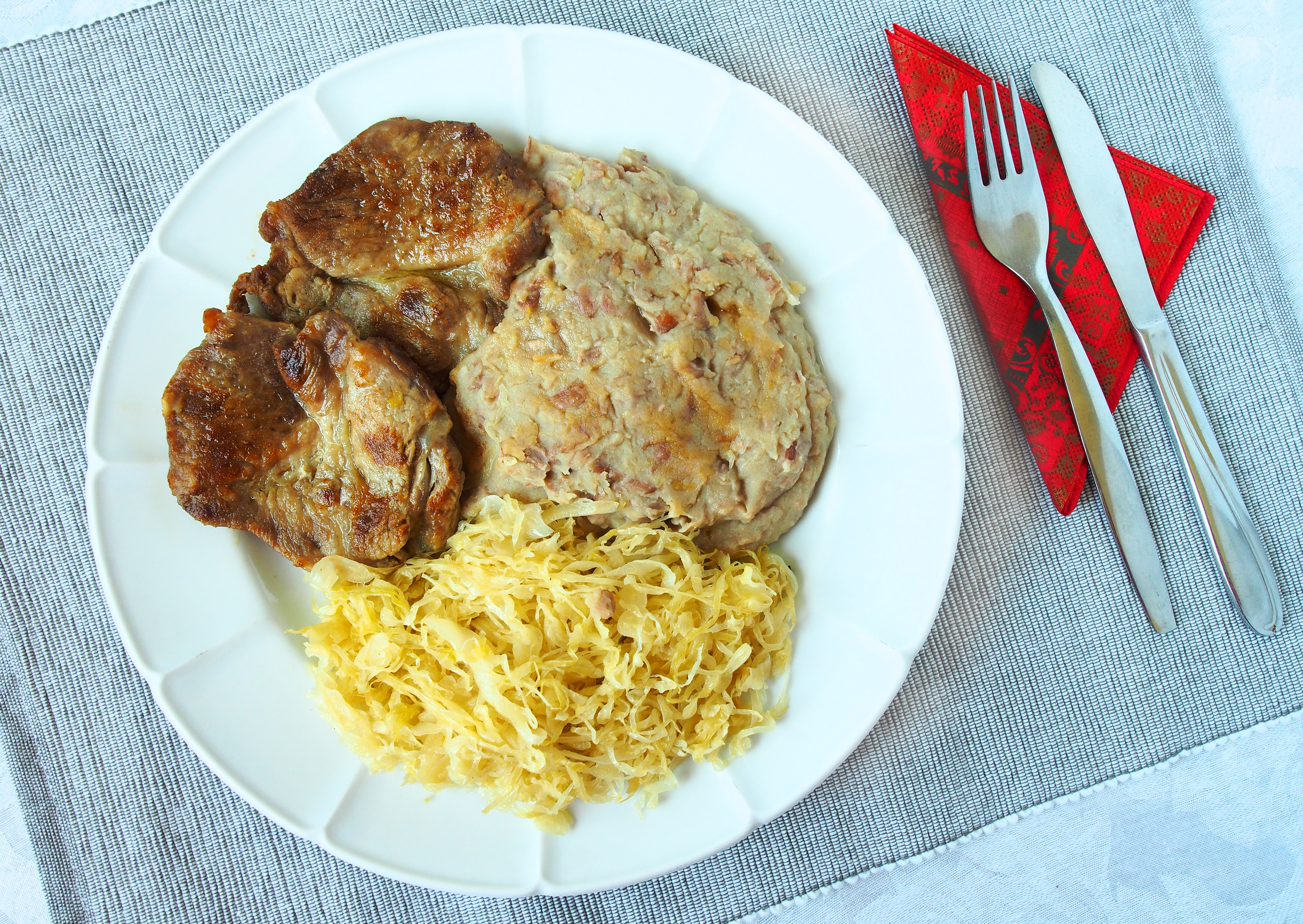
Matevž

Matevž (puréed beans with cracklings) is a Slovene national dish. The dish is typical of central Slovenia, especially of the Kočevje region. It is made of beans and potatoes. Its origins come from the 19th century. Originally, the lower social classes ate it as a main course. The dish is also known as krompirjev mož 'potato mush' (cf. Gottschee German muož 'mush'), belokranjski mož 'White Carniola mush', or medved (literally, 'bear'). The term matevž is a derivative from male name Matej or Matevž (Matthew). Matej or Matevž word origins to many other dialectical expressions: to have matevža means to have a hangover.

It is mostly served as a side dish. It is usually eaten with sauerkraut or turnips.

== See also ==
- List of legume dishes
- Slovenian cuisine
