= Žganci =

Dish in Slovenian and Croatian cuisine

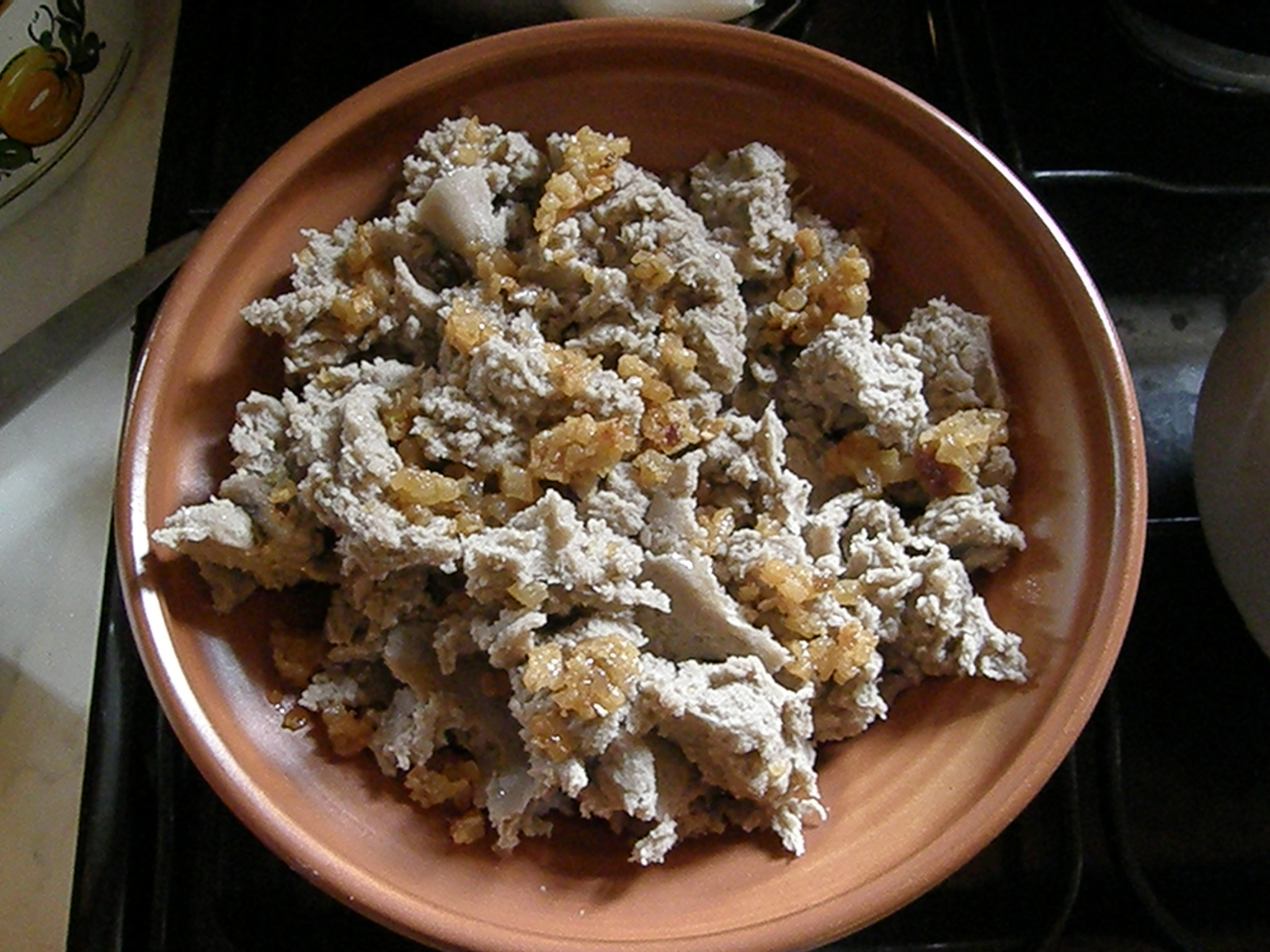
Ajdovi žganci with cracklings

Žganci is a traditional dish made from buckwheat, cornmeal, or wheat flour. It is considered a national dish of Slovenia, particularly in its buckwheat form known as ajdovi žganci.

Regional variations of the dish are also found in Northern Croatia, especially in Zagorje, Međimurje, and Turopolje, where it is considered part of local rural cuisine rather than a national staple.

Žganci is often compared to polenta, although it differs in texture and preparation.

== Preparation ==
The dish is made from buckwheat flour in Slovenia (Slovene: Ajdovi žganci) and cornmeal in Croatia (Croatian: Kukuruzna krupica), cooking oil and salt, which is cooked for fifteen minutes on a low boil. Softer žganci is called Styrian style in Slovenia. Žganci can be served with milk (žganci z mlekom/žganci s mlijekom), honey, lard and cracklings, or runny yogurt. A savory version is served with meat as part of a main dish.

== Žganci in Slovenia ==
Žganci was a typical everyday meal of the central and Alpine parts of Slovenia. Its popularity and common use is implied in the following witticism from the 19th century: "Žganci are the pedestal of Carniola." This attitude implies its crucial meaning for the survival of the population. Freshly boiled žganci could be served as breakfast or lunch, or warmed-up or toasted for dinner or breakfast the following day. Belsazar Hacquet (1739–1815) mentions that žganci was served with sauerkraut in Upper Carniola. The oldest preparation method explains the word žganci. The word žganci is derived from the Slovenian verb žgati 'to burn, to toast'.

== See also ==
- Ga'at
- Grits
- Farina (food)
- Frico
- Hasty pudding
- List of maize dishes
- List of porridges
- Mămăligă
- Masa
- Mush
- Nshima
- Pap
- Pudding corn
- Schmarrn
- Sadza
- Ugali
- Upma
