= Njoki =

Njoki is a given name and surname. Notable people with the name include:

== Given name ==
- Njoki Muhoho, Kenyan producer and filmmaker
- Njoki Susanna Ndung'u, Kenyan lawyer and judge
- Njoki Ngumi, Kenyan filmmaker and doctor
- Njoki Wainaina, Kenyan gender and development consultant
- Njoki Wamai, Kenyan academic

== Surname ==
- Irene Mrembo Njoki (born 1975), Kenyan politician
- Mary Njoki (born 21989), Kenyan businesswoman
