= Ajdovi žganci =

Slovenian cuisine

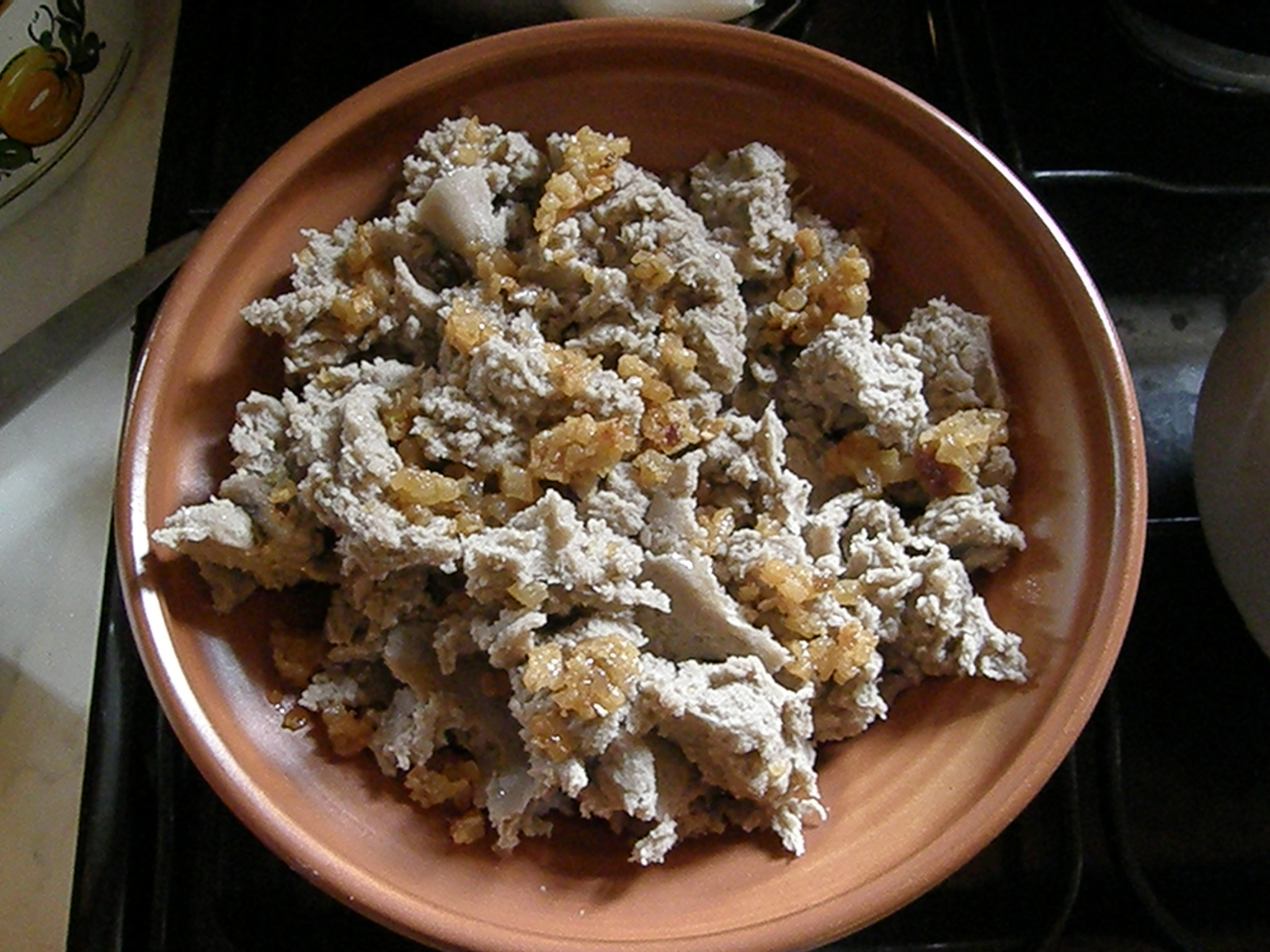
- Ajdovi žganci with cracklings
- Type: žganci
- Place of origin: Slovenia
- Main ingredients: buckwheat, water, salt, cracklings, oil or grease

Ajdovi žganci is a sort of žganci. Translated to English, it would be referred to as "buckwheat mush" or "buckwheat spoonbread". It is a national Slovene dish. Balthasar Hacquet (1739–1815) mentions that žganci was served with sauerkraut in Upper Carniola. The oldest preparation method explains the word žganci. The word žganci is derived from the Slovenian verb žgati meaning "to burn" or "to toast". Ajdovi žganci are served together with obaras, meat sauces, milk, sauerkraut, black pudding, or various sausages and soups. The ingredients may vary through different regions.

In general the main ingredients are:

- buckwheat flour
- water
- salt
- cracklings
- oil or grease

In some cases potatoes are mixed in.

== See also ==
- List of buckwheat dishes
