= Cui shao =

Chinese pork snack

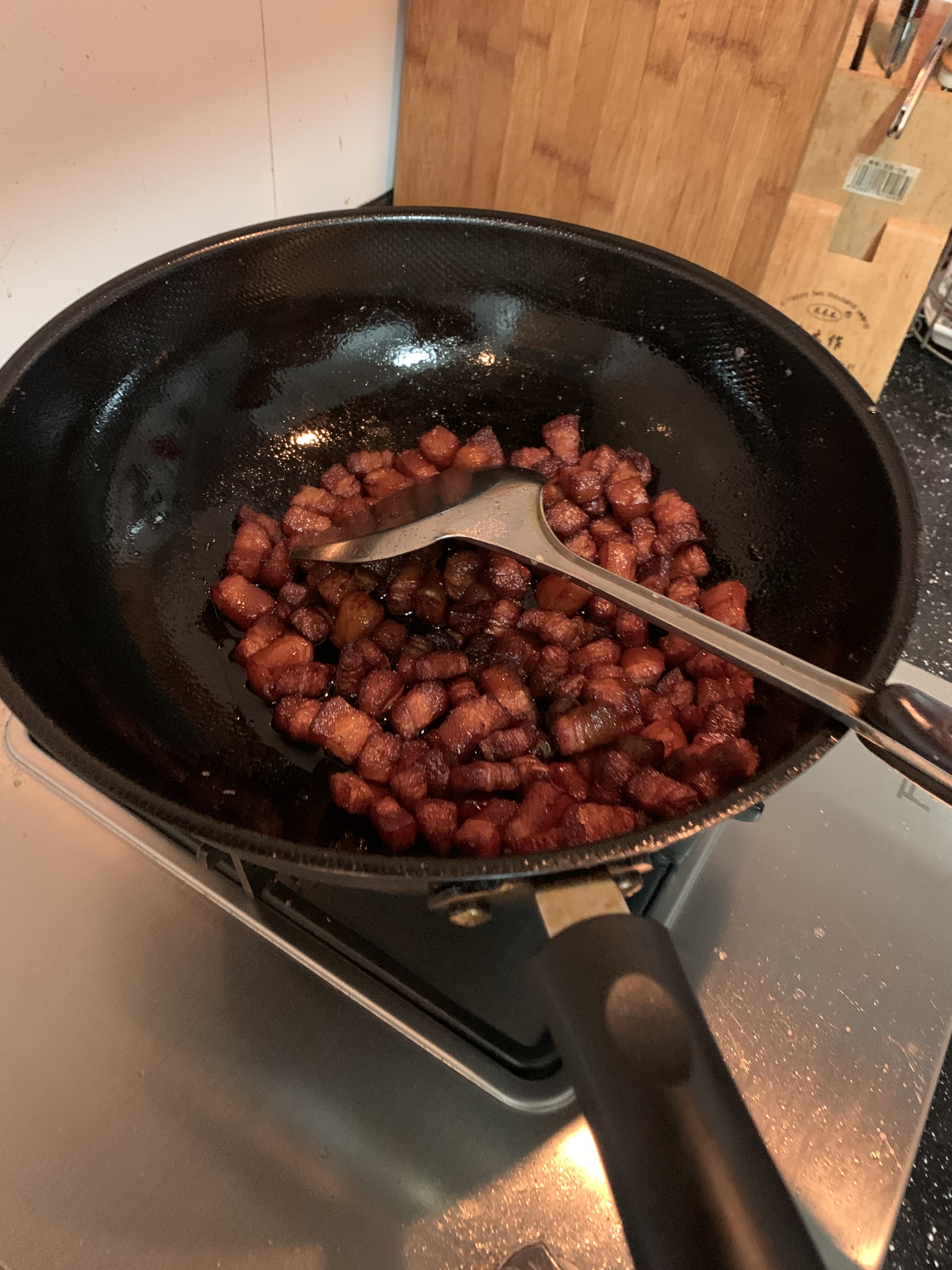
cooking cui-shao

Cui shao (Chinese: 脆哨; pinyin: cuì shào) is a type of crackling from Guiyang, Guizhou province, China consisting of pork from which most of the fat has been rendered.

The name "cui shao" comes from the sound that the snack makes when bitten into. Some people believe that this name is a mispronunciation caused by the inability of Guiyang accent speakers to distinguish between the characters "哨/shao" and "臊/sao." However, the name "cui shao" has already been widely accepted by the local people.
