= Polenta =

Italian porridge, usually of cornmeal

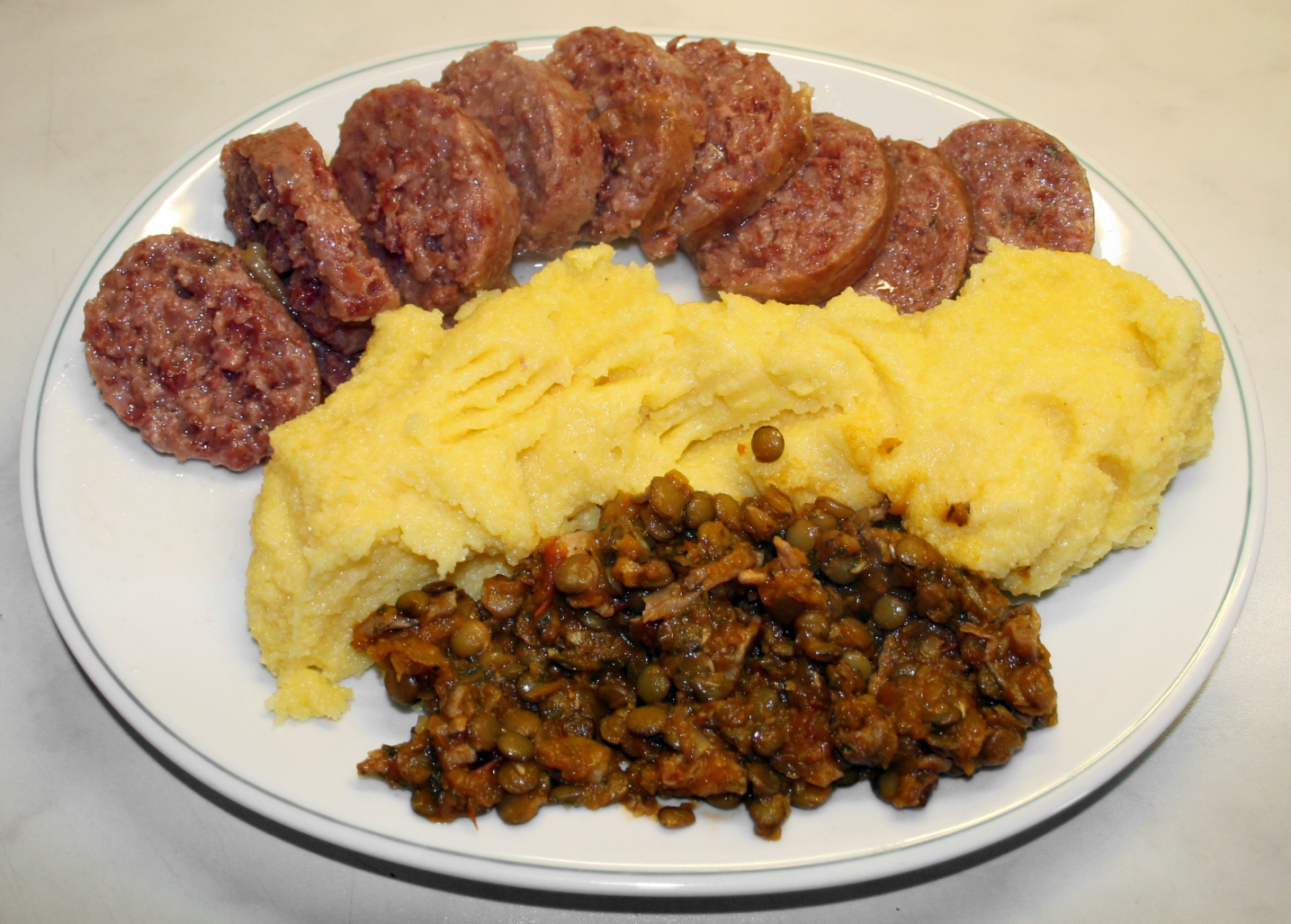
- Polenta served with boiled cotechino Modena (top) and lentils (bottom)
- Type: Porridge
- Place of origin: Italy
- Region or state: Northern and central Italy
- Main ingredients: Yellow or white cornmeal, liquid (water, soup stock)

Polenta (/pəˈlɛntə, poʊˈ-/, Italian: [poˈlɛnta]) is an Italian dish of boiled cornmeal that was historically made from other grains. It may be allowed to cool and solidify into a loaf that can be baked, fried or grilled.

The variety of cereal used is usually yellow maize, but often buckwheat, white maize or mixtures thereof may be used. Coarse grinds make a firm, coarse polenta; finer grinds make a soft, creamy polenta. Polenta is a staple of both northern and, to a lesser extent, central Italian, Swiss Italian, southern French, Croatian, Slovenian, Serbian, Romanian and, due to Italian migrants, Brazilian, Uruguayan, and Argentinian cuisines. It is often mistaken for the Slovene-Croatian food named žganci. Its consumption was traditionally associated with lower classes, as in times past cornmeal mush was an essential food in their everyday nutrition.

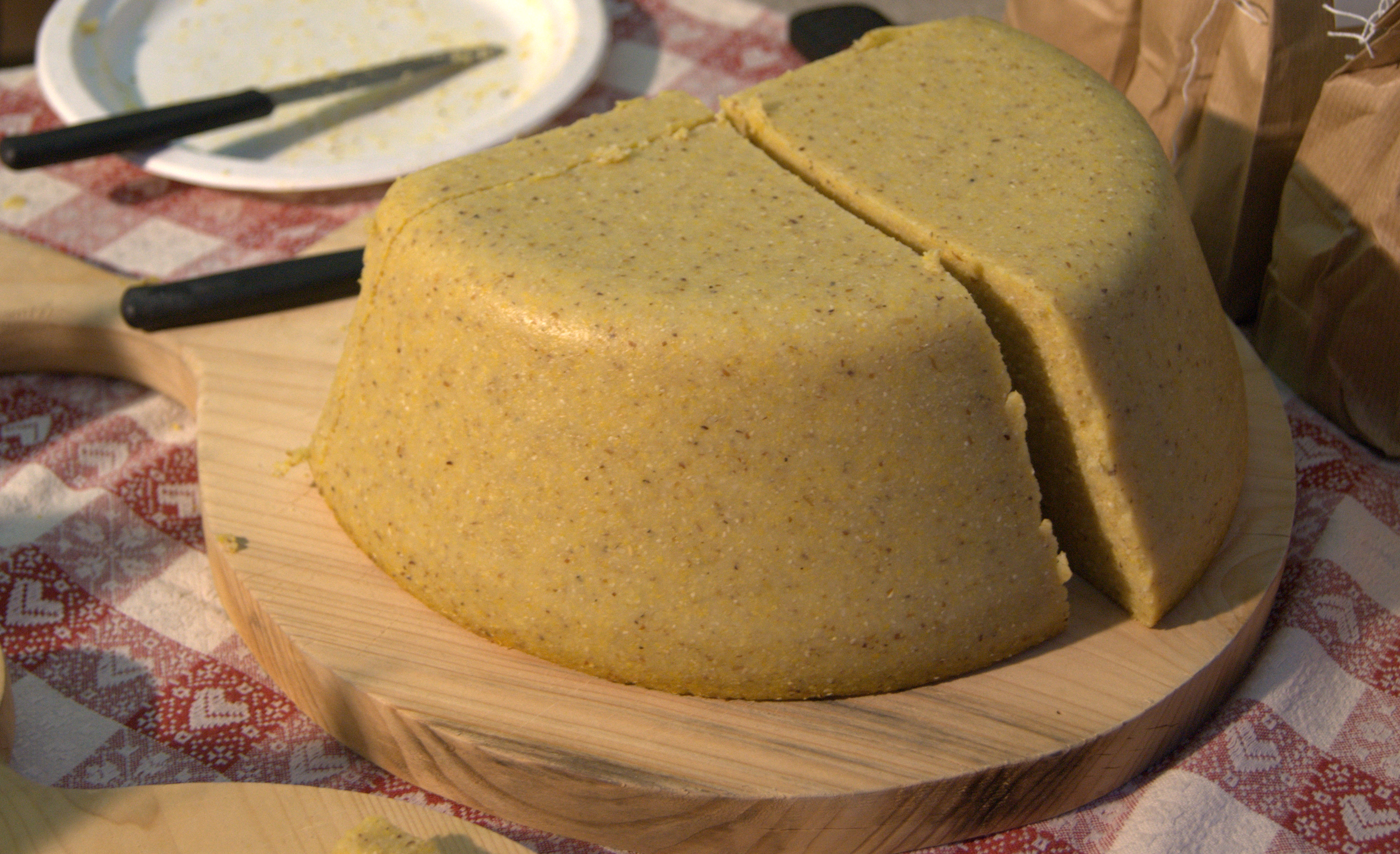
Polenta served in the traditional manner on a round wooden cutting board

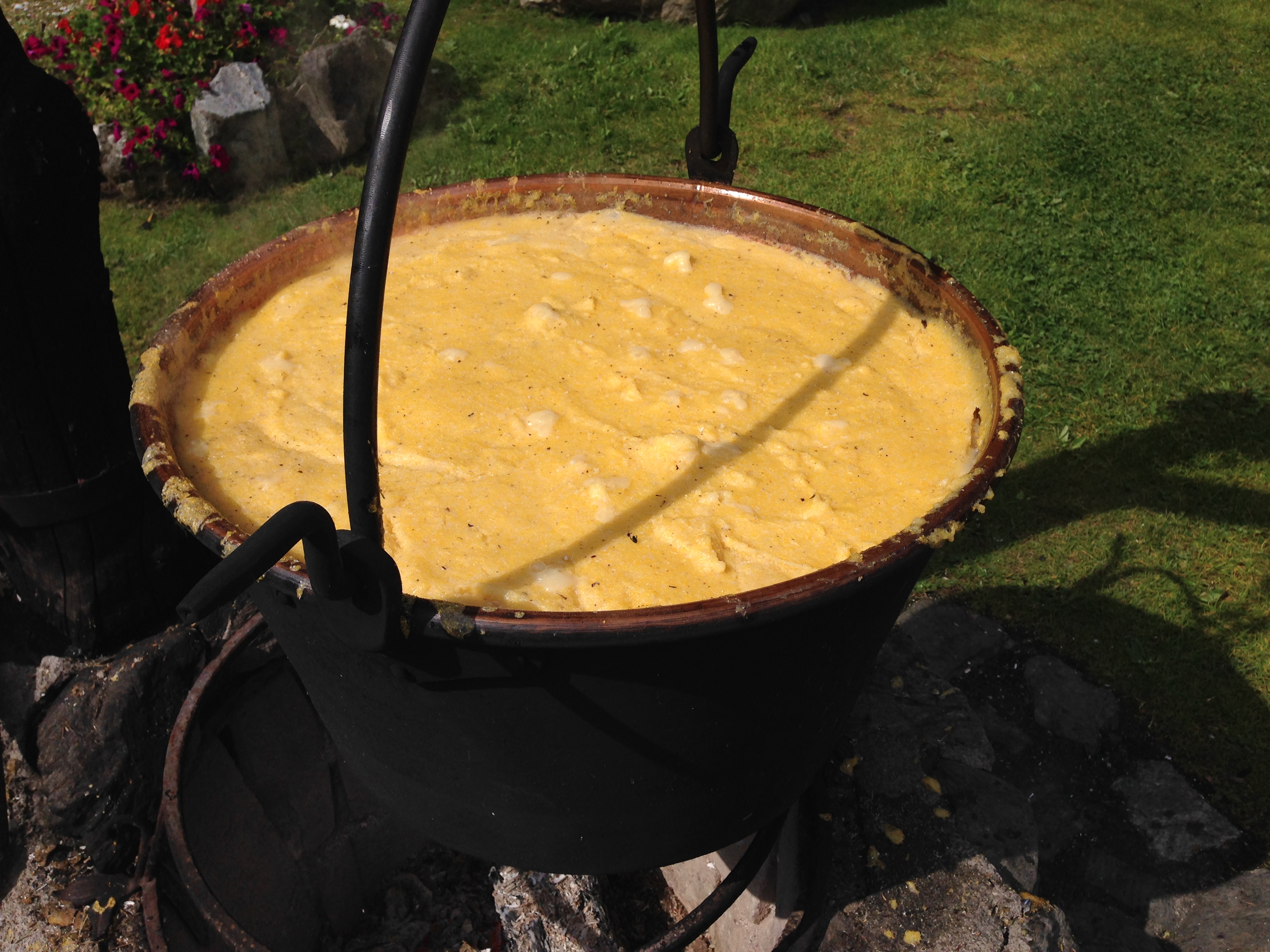
Polenta in paiolo

== Etymology ==
Polenta covered any hulled and crushed grain, especially barley-meal. It is derived from the Latin pollen for 'fine flour', which shares a root with pulvis, meaning 'dust'.

== History ==
As it is known today, polenta derives from earlier forms of grain mush (known as puls or pulmentum in Latin) that were commonly eaten since Roman times. Before the introduction of corn (maize) from America in the 16th century, it was made from starchy ingredients, such as farro, chestnut flour, millet, spelt, and chickpeas.

Polenta was brought to the south of Brazil by Italian immigrants in the late 19th century and has become an important part of Italian-Brazilian culture and identity in the states of Rio Grande do Sul, Santa Catarina, and Paraná. The fried version, though, has become popular even in other regions that did not receive Italian migration and is a popular snack and finger food in bars across the country.

== Cooking time ==
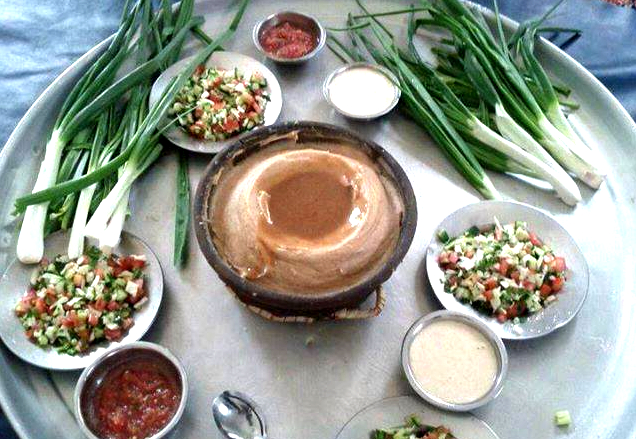
Sorghum-meal polenta with soup stock in center

Polenta takes a long time to cook, simmering in four to five times its volume of watery liquid for about 45 minutes with near-constant stirring; this is necessary for even gelatinization of the starch. Some alternative cooking techniques have been invented to speed up the process or not require constant supervision. Quick-cooking (pre-cooked instant) polenta is widely used and is prepared in just a few minutes; it is considered inferior to polenta made from unprocessed cornmeal and is best eaten after being baked or fried. In Heat (2006) Bill Buford details the differences in taste between instant polenta and slow-cooked polenta and describes a method of preparation that takes up to three hours but does not require constant stirring:

"... polenta, for most of its cooking, is left unattended. If you don't have to stir it all the time, you can cook it for hours – what does it matter, as long as you're nearby?" — Buford (2006)

In January 1998 Cook's Illustrated magazine described a preparation method using a microwave oven, that reduces cooking time to 12 minutes and requires only a single stir. The March 2010 issue presented a nearly-unstirred stovetop method, which replicates the traditional method using a pinch of baking soda (an alkali).

== See also ==
Media related to Polentas at Wikimedia Commons Polenta at the Wikibooks Cookbook subproject

- List of maize dishes
- List of porridges
