= Sour soup fish =

Chinese fish soup dish

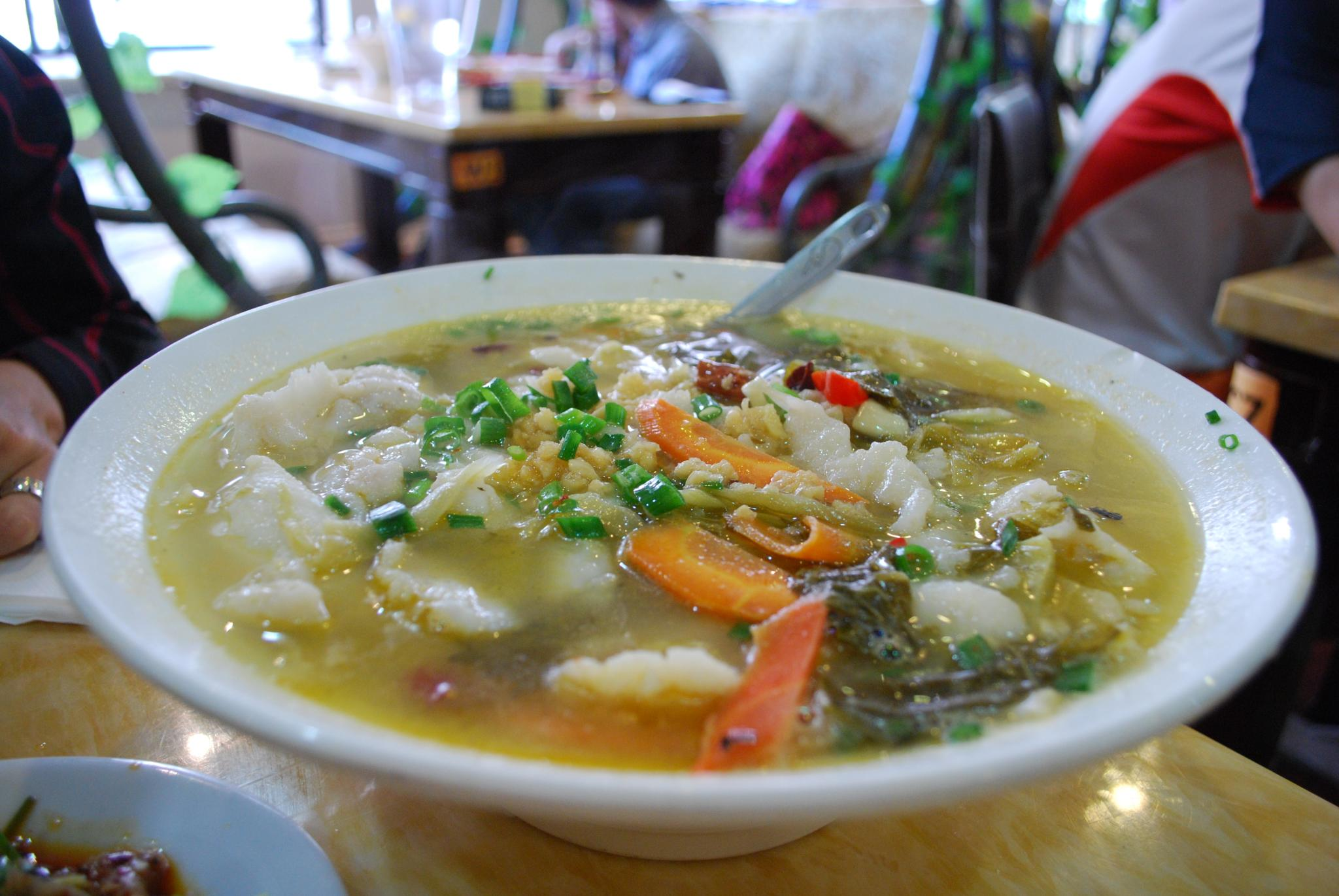
Image of sour soup fish (preserved mustard green with fish) served in a bowl.

Sour soup fish (Chinese: 酸汤鱼; pinyin: suān tāng yú) is a representative dish of Guizhou Province, China. It originated from the Miao ethnic cuisine in Qiandongnan Miao-Dong Autonomous Prefecture several hundred years ago. Sour Soup Fish is commonly served at Miao weddings, baby's first month celebrations, gatherings, and when entertaining guests. The sour soup is made by fermenting glutinous rice flour and simmering it with locally grown cherry tomatoes from Guizhou. The soup is then cooked with carp, grass carp, or black fish and seasoned with chili, Sichuan peppercorn, salt, and other spices. Sour soup fish is popular for its tender fish meat and delicious sour flavor. Additionally, there is also a variation of the dish that uses pickled tomatoes as an ingredient for the sour soup. It is cooked with carp, soybean sprouts, bamboo shoots, tofu, and served with fermented bean curd, cilantro, and chili as dipping sauce.
