= List of Croatian dishes =

This is a list of dishes found in Croatian cuisine in alphabetical order. Croatian cuisine has developed through centuries, it is heterogeneous and known as a cuisine of the regions. Every region of Croatia has its own distinct culinary tradition.

== Croatian dishes ==
Name	Image	Region	Description
Brudet		Dalmatia, Kvarner, Istria	A type of fish stew with spices, vegetables and red or white wine
Češnovka		Turopolje	A kind of spicy pork garlic sausage
Čobanac		Slavonia	Shepherd’s stew made with three or more types of meat, including game. Seasoned with sweet and hot paprika.
Črne čurke		Međimurje	Black pudding (blood pudding), first cooked or dried and finally baked
Crni rižot		Coast	Black risotto prepared with cuttlefish and cuttlefish ink
Čvarci		Northern Croatia, Slavonia	A kind of pork cracklings
Dalmatinska peka		Dalmatia	A dish made of meat, vegetables and/or potatoes, baked under curved metal lid
Fiš paprikaš		Slavonia, Baranja	Spicy paprika-based thick fish soup prepared with carp or mixed river fish
Fritaja		Istria	Eggs with asparagus, wild hops, herbs as fennel, mint, feverfew and chicory, tomatoes, young garlic sprouts, spices and small parts of old bread
Fritule		Dalmatia, Kvarner, Istria	Sweet festive pastry flavoured with rum, made particularly for Christmas
Fuži		Istria	A traditional Istrian pasta from the pasta dough rolled into a thin sheet, cut into strips three to four centimetres wide, placed over each other, then cooked and served with a mild red veal sauce
Grahova pretepena juha		Međimurje, Northern Croatia	Type of traditional thick bean soup from Međimurje prepared with stirred flour mixed with milk and sour cream
Hladnetina		Northern Croatia, Central Croatia	Pork jelly made from low-grade cuts of pig meat, such as trotters, that contain a significant proportion of connective tissue
Istrian stew		Istria	A stew made of beans, sour cabbage or sour turnip, potatoes, bacon and spare ribs
Janjetina s ražnja		Lika, Dalmatia, Istria	Lamb being roasted on a roasting spit, served with fried potato slices or so
Kotlovina		Northern Croatia, Central Croatia	Fried and stewed meat dish prepared and served outdoors, containing pork chops, sausages etc., stewed in their own juice, wine and various spices (onions, peppers, garlic etc.)
Kremšnita		Northern Croatia, Central Croatia	A variety of sweet custard and chantilly cream cream cake dessert
Kroštule		Dalmatia, Istria	A traditional pastry made from fried sweet dough sprinkled with sugar
Kulen		Slavonia	A type of flavored sausage made of minced pork
Međimurska gibanica		Međimurje	Layer cake made of puff pastry and four fillings: nuts, fresh cheese, poppy seeds and apples
Meso z tiblice		Međimurje	A dish prepared from high-quality parts of fresh pork meat (leg or loin), which are after processing stored in tiblica (lodrica), a large wood container of a special shape (truncated cone) in which the meat is preserved in previously prepared, cooled salted lard
Pašticada		Dalmatia	braised beef dish cooked in a fragrant sweet and sour sauce from southern Croatia
Pokladnice (krafne)		Northern Croatia, Central Croatia	Airy filled doughnuts, round and usually filled with jelly, marmalade, jam or chocolate as well as butter, nutella and cinnamon
Punjena paprika		Northern Croatia, Central Croatia	Stuffed pepper dish made of peppers stuffed with a mix of minced meat and rice, eggs, spices and salt in tomato sauce, served with mashed potatoes
Sir s vrhnjem		Northern Croatia, Central Croatia	Homemade fresh curd cheese (quark) with cream, served with bacon and onion
Soparnik		Dalmatia	A savoury pie with a filling of chard
Turoš		Međimurje	A type of cheese made from cattle's milk in cone-shaping chunks of cottage cheese, with the addition of salt and red paprika
Zagorski štrukli		Hrvatsko Zagorje	A dish composed of dough and various types of filling (e.g. a mixture of cottage cheese with eggs, sour cream and salt) which can be either boiled or baked
Žganci		Northern Croatia	A dish made from buckwheat flour, maize, wheat, or a combination of potato and wheat flour and water, cooking oil and salt

== See also ==
- List of national dishes
- List of European cuisines
