= Češnjovka =

Croatian spicy pork garlic sausage

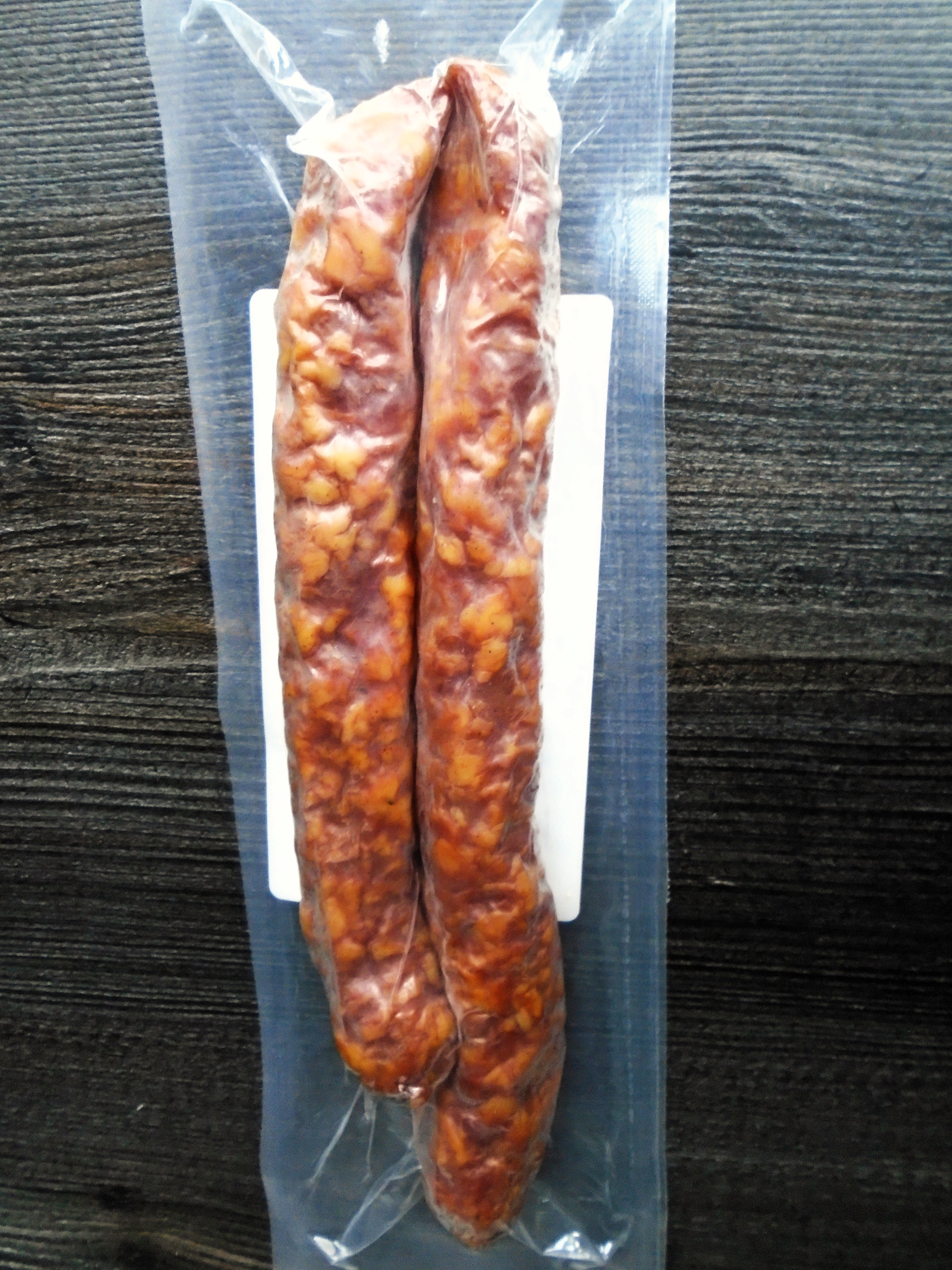
- Češnjovka in a packaging foil
- Course: Sausage
- Place of origin: Croatia
- Region or state: Turopolje
- Main ingredients: pork, salt, spices, antioxidant

Češnjovka (TSCHESH-nyov-kah) is a Croatian spicy pork garlic sausage from Turopolje.

== See also ==
- Croatian cuisine
- List of sausages
- List of Croatian dishes
