= Jókai bean soup =

Hungarian bean soup

Jókai bean soup (Jókai bableves) is a Hungarian bean soup. It is a rich bean soup with many vegetables, smoked pork hock pieces and noodles. It is often made to be spicy or some sort of hot chili offered with it. Despite its richness it is served with sour cream on top and white bread, and this soup is a lunch or dinner in itself.

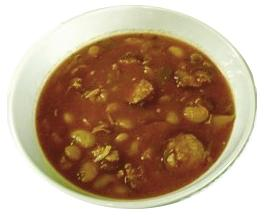

== Origin ==
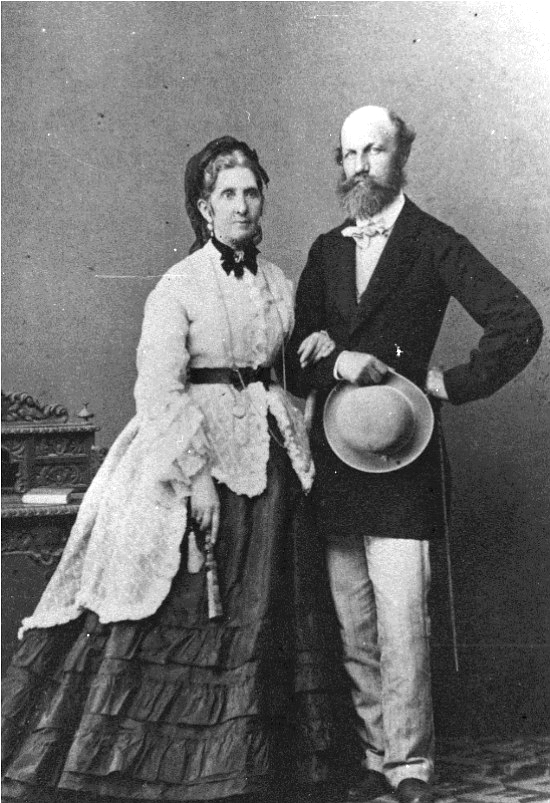
Laborfalvi Róza and Jókai Mór

The soup was named after Jókai Mór, a Hungarian writer. Jókai was a regular guest at a restaurant in Balatonfüred, where he almost always ordered bean soup, which was subsequently named in honor of him. Multiple sources state that he also enjoyed halászlé (fish soup).

In Jókai's works, there are gastronomic writings, compilations, and resources. In 1854 he published Zoltán Kárpáthy, in which there is a detailed description of a buffet.

== See also ==
- List of bean soups
- List of soups
