= Grah =

Grah may refer to:

- Grahova pretepena juha, bean cream soup from Međimurje, Croatia
- Joe Grah, American musician

== See also ==
- Melissa McIntosh (née Grah, born 1977) Australian politician
