= Zeljanik =

Zeljanik is the name of

- a mountain peak in the Klekovača group in the Dinaric Alps in Bosnia and Herzegovina
- a chard-filled, usually savoury pie from the dalmatian Poljica region in Croatia, see Soparnik
