= Amish preaching soup =

Bean soup in US cuisine

- Type: Bean soup
- Place of origin: United States
- Main ingredients: Beans

Amish preaching soup is a type of bean soup in American cuisine. It was typically served preceding or following Amish church services. Some versions are prepared with beans and ham hocks.

== See also ==
- List of bean soups
- List of soups
