= Gibanica =

Serbian dish of filo, cheese and eggs

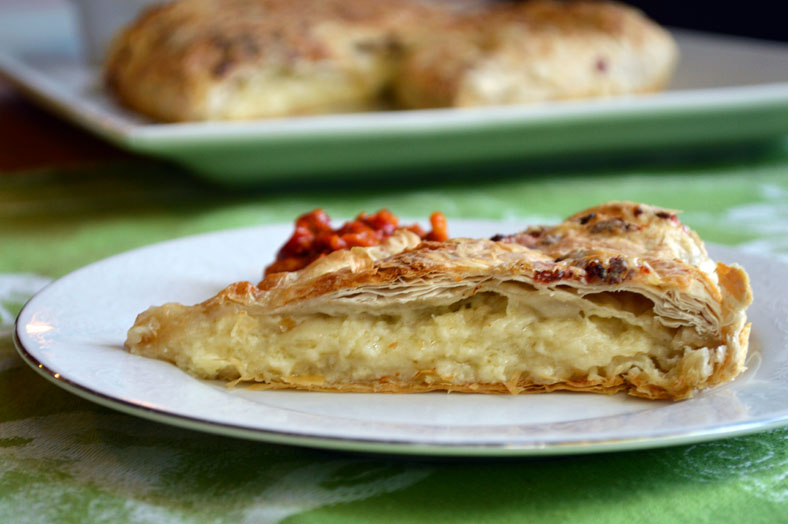
- A piece of gibanica
- Alternative names: Gužvara
- Type: Pastry
- Place of origin: former Yugoslavia
- Serving temperature: Hot or cold
- Main ingredients: Phyllo dough, white cheese (feta, sirene), eggs
- Other information: Other ingredients include milk, kaymak and lard or sunflower oil and different types of fruit and nuts

Gibanica (Serbian Cyrillic: гибаница, pronounced [ˈɡibanit͡sa]) is a traditional pastry dish popular all over the Balkans and also Central Europe. It is usually made with cottage cheese and eggs. Recipes can range from sweet to savoury, and from simple to festive and elaborate multi-layered cakes.

The pastry was mentioned in Vuk Stefanović Karadžić's Serbian Dictionary in 1818 and by a Slovenian priest Jožef Kosič in 1828, where it was described as a special Slovenian cake which is "a must at wedding festivities and is also served to workers after finishing a big project". It is a type of layered strudel, a combination of Turkish and Austrian influences in different cuisines of the former Yugoslavia. Today the versions of this cake can be found in Croatia, Serbia, Bosnia, North Macedonia and other regions of the former Yugoslavia. Variants of this rich layered strudel are found in Hungary, Bulgaria, Greece, Turkey, Romania, and Syria.

Gibanica may sometimes also refer to a walnut roll, which is sweet bread with a spiral of walnut paste rolled up inside.

== Etymology ==
In the vocabulary of the Yugoslav Academy, as well as in the etymological dictionary of Slavic languages, the word gibanica is a derivative of the Serbo-Croatian verb gíbati/гибати, which means "to fold; sway, swing, rock". There are also derivatives like the word gibaničar/гибаничар – one who makes gibanica, one who loves to eat gibanica, and one who always imposes as a guest and at someone else's expense.

The Yugoslav ethnologist Milenko Filipović theorized that gibanica instead came from the Egyptian Arabic word gebna (جبنة), referring to a soft, white, salty variety of Egyptian cheese that is similar to the cheese used for gibanica.

== Preparation ==
The original recipe for gibanica included traditionally homemade phyllo dough and cow's milk cheese. Homemade cheese can be feta or sirene. The pie is usually made as gužvara (crumpled pie), so the phyllo dough in the middle is crumpled and filled. Besides cheese, the filling contains eggs, milk, kaymak, lard, salt and water. Also, stuffing may include spinach, meat, nettle, potato and onion. To speed up preparation, purchased phyllo dough can be used and sunflower oil or olive oil can be used instead of lard.

== Variants ==
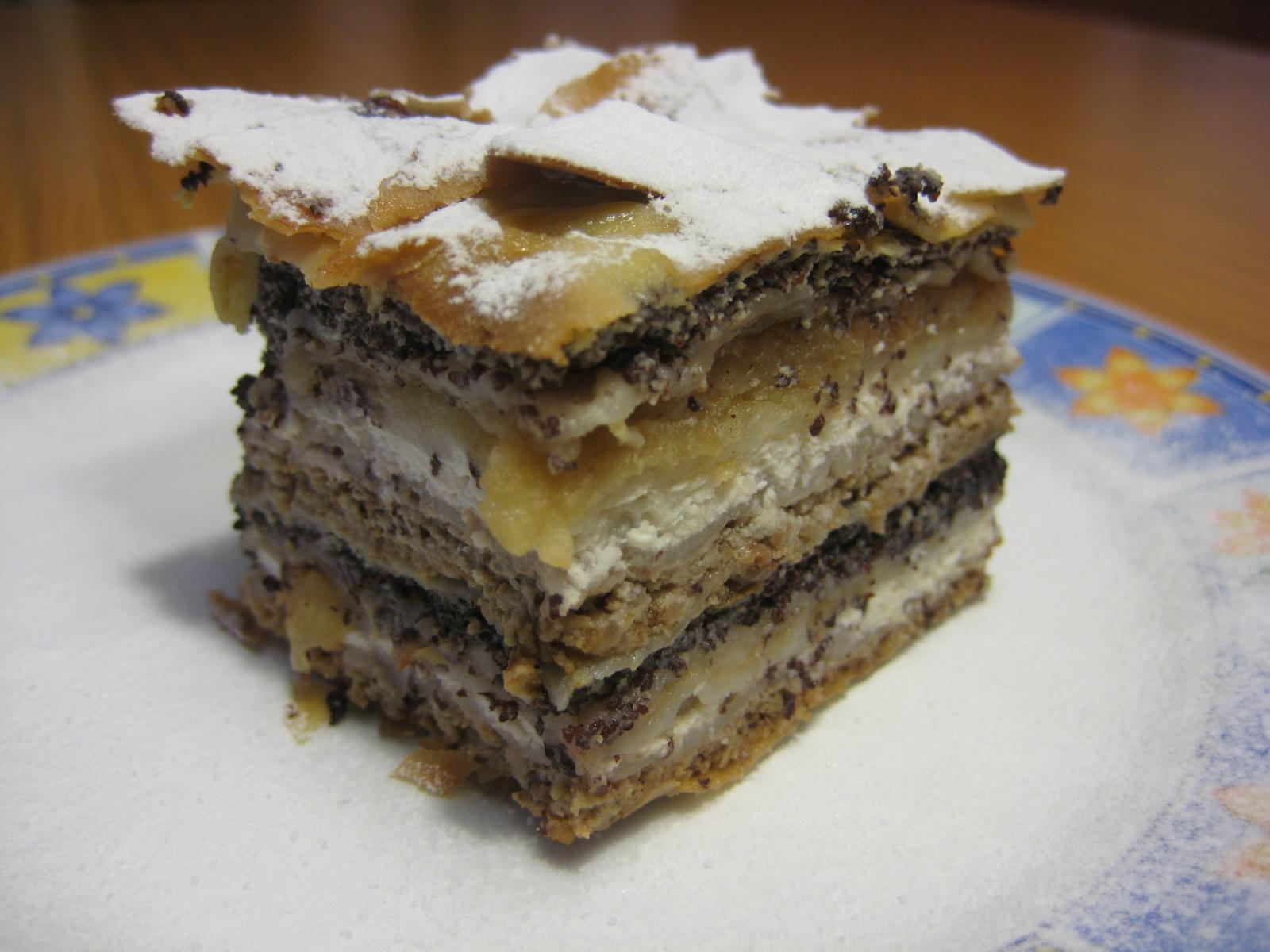
Prekmurska gibanica, a Slovenian variant

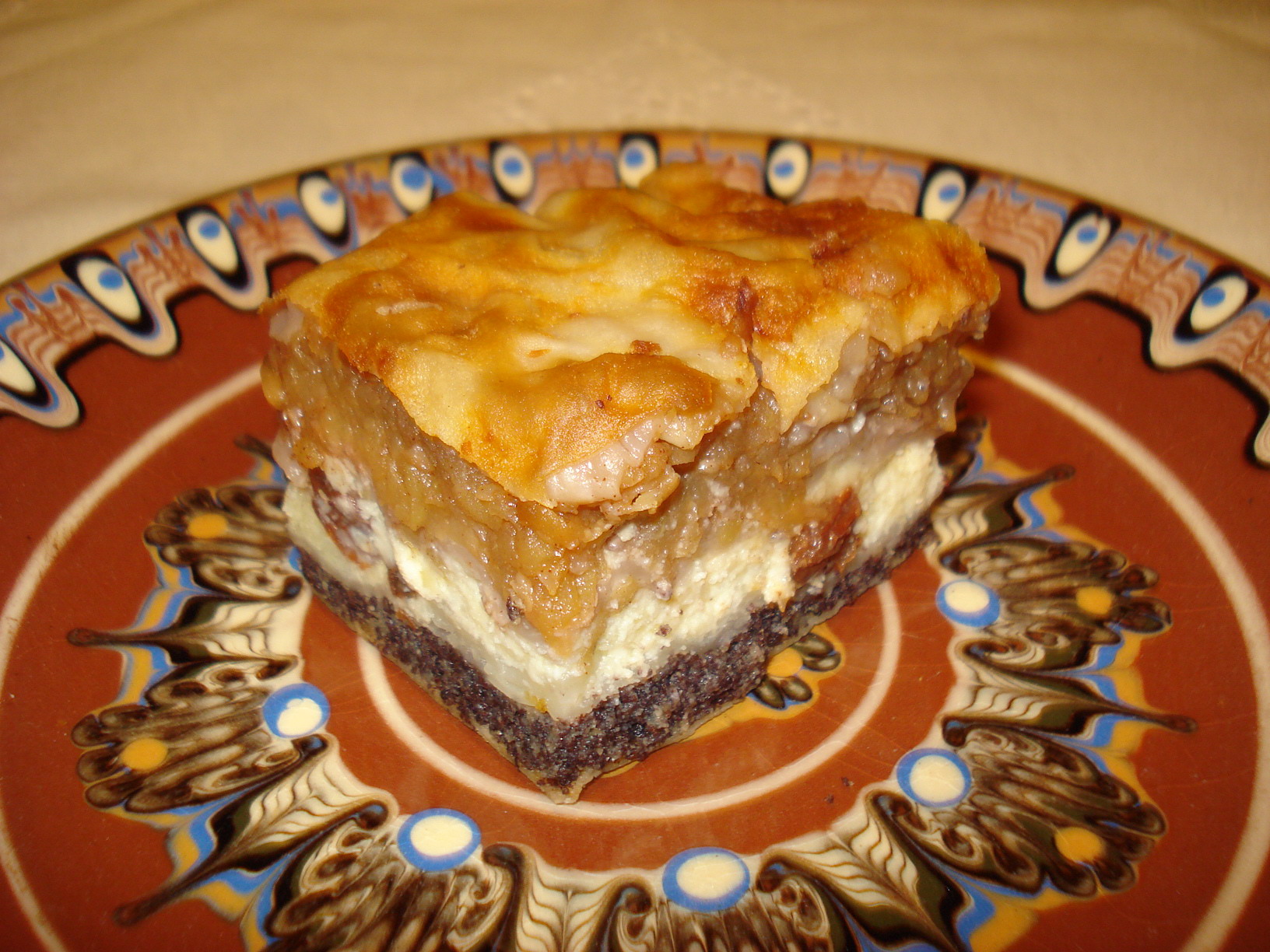
Međimurska gibanica, a Croatian variant

Many varieties of gibanica and related dishes can be found throughout Central Europe and the Balkans; different gibanica are known as part of the national cuisines of Bosnia and Herzegovina, Croatia, Serbia, North Macedonia, Slovenia, and Friuli-Venezia Giulia (Italy, where it is called ghibanizza), Greece, and Bulgaria, where it is usually called banitsa. Recipes can range from sweet to savoury, and from simple to festive and elaborate multi-layered cakes. The so-called "chetnik gibanica" is the fatter, greasier version; it received the name after World War II.

From the basic recipe, many local specialties have evolved. Prekmurska gibanica, for example, is a "fancy" multi-layered cake from Prekmurje in Slovenia, served as a dessert course on festive occasions. Međimurska gibanica, from the neighbouring Međimurje region of Croatia, is a closely related but simpler and less "formal" dish consisting of four layers of fillings (prepared fresh cheese (quark), poppyseed, apple and walnut). Another gibanica variety, called Prleška gibanica, is known from Prlekija to the west of the Mur River.

The basic concept of gibanica, a cake or pie involving a combination of pastry with cheese in differentiated layers often combined with layers of various other fillings, is common in the cuisines of the Balkans, Anatolia, and the Eastern Mediterranean. For example, a similar dish known as shabiyat (sh'abiyat, shaabiyat) is part of the cuisine of Syria and Lebanon. Gibanica can also be considered to resemble a type of cheese strudel, with which it likely shares a common ancestry in the pastry dishes of the region, and the cuisines of the Byzantine and Ottoman empires.

== In culture ==
Gibanica is one of the most recognizable pastry dishes from the Balkans, whether served on festive occasions or as a comforting family snack. In Serbia, the dish is eaten as breakfast, dinner, appetizer and snack, and is often consumed at traditional events such as Christmas, Easter and Slava. The largest gibanica ever made was in the town of Mionica in 2007. It weighed over 1,000 kg, and was applied for inclusion in the Guinness Book of Records. Around 330 kg of phyllo dough, 330 kg of cheese, 3,300 eggs, 30 L of oil, 110 L of mineral water, 50 kg of lard and 500 packets of baking powder went into its creation. In Slovenia, Croatia and Serbia there are festivals dedicated to gibanica. One of them, called the Gibanica Festival or Days of Banitsa, is held each year in Bela Palanka. It first took place in 2005. The Slovenian festival of Prekmurska gibanica and ham is held in the Slovenian region of Prekmurje, and the Croatian festival of gibanica is held in Igrišće in Hrvatsko Zagorje.

== Sources ==
- Zirojević, Olga (30 April 2003). "Gibanica". Republika (in Serbian). Vol. XV, no. 306–307.
- "Gibanica, a pie like no other". Serbia.com. 4 December 2012.
