= Međimurska gibanica =

Croatian dessert

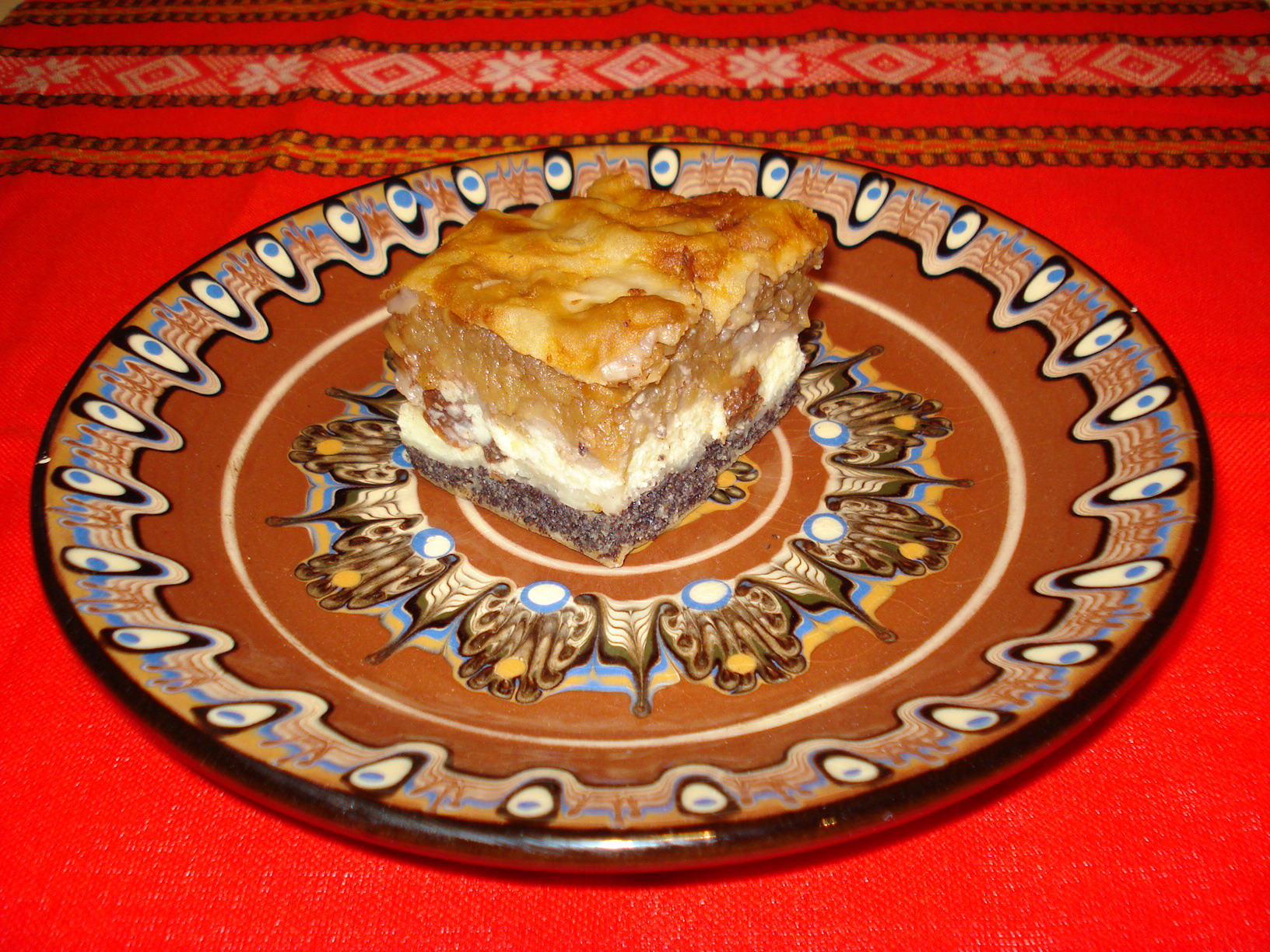
- Međimurska gibanica, traditionally served
- Alternative names: Medjimurian layer cake
- Type: Layer cake
- Place of origin: Međimurje County
- Region or state: Croatia
- Serving temperature: warm or cold
- Main ingredients: filo pastry, ground poppy seed, fresh quark, chopped or ground walnuts, grated apples

Međimurska gibanica (pronounced [mɛdʑǐmuːrska 'ɡibanitsa] 'Međimurje layer cake') is a type of gibanica, or layer cake, originating from Međimurje County, Croatia. It is made of filo pastry and four fillings: walnuts, fresh quark, poppy seeds and apples, as well as of many additional ingredients. It is a traditional dish, especially popular in Northern Croatia, rich in flavour and full of calories.

This dessert cake recipe is one of the large number of regional varieties of gibanica which have been developed in other regions of Central and Eastern Europe.

== Preparation and serving ==
A base layer of prepared dough is stretched in a suitable casserole previously greased with fat. It is then covered with the first of four layers of filling consisting of milk sodden chopped or ground walnuts, fresh quark cheese, milk sodden ground poppy seed and grated apples. The layer of filling is spread over the entire surface, followed by the second layer of dough, the second layer of filling and so on, until all four layers of filling are put on. The final layer of dough is topped with poured sour cream previously mixed with melted butter or egg.

The casserole is put into oven and baked for approximately one hour at 200 °C (392 °F). The cake can be served either still warm directly from the casserole or left to cool to room temperature. It can be cut into quarters or rectangles and finally sprinkled with powdered sugar.

== Specifics ==
Međimurska gibanica is a specific type of gibanica, which differs from other varieties in several details concerning the dough, the fillings, the look and the composition of some secondary or additional ingredients (such as sugar, sour cream, milk, butter, eggs, raisins, and cinnamon). Compared, for instance, with prekmurska gibanica, it contains puff pastry instead of shortcrust pastry, as well as fresh quark instead of ricotta or cottage cheese. Međimurska gibanica has simpler and thicker four-layer fillings instead of doubled and thinner eight-layer fillings of prekmurska gibanica. Generally, it is moister and softer than most other types of gibanica.

== See also ==
- Pogača
- Zagorski štrukli
