= Kotlovina =

Croatian meat dish

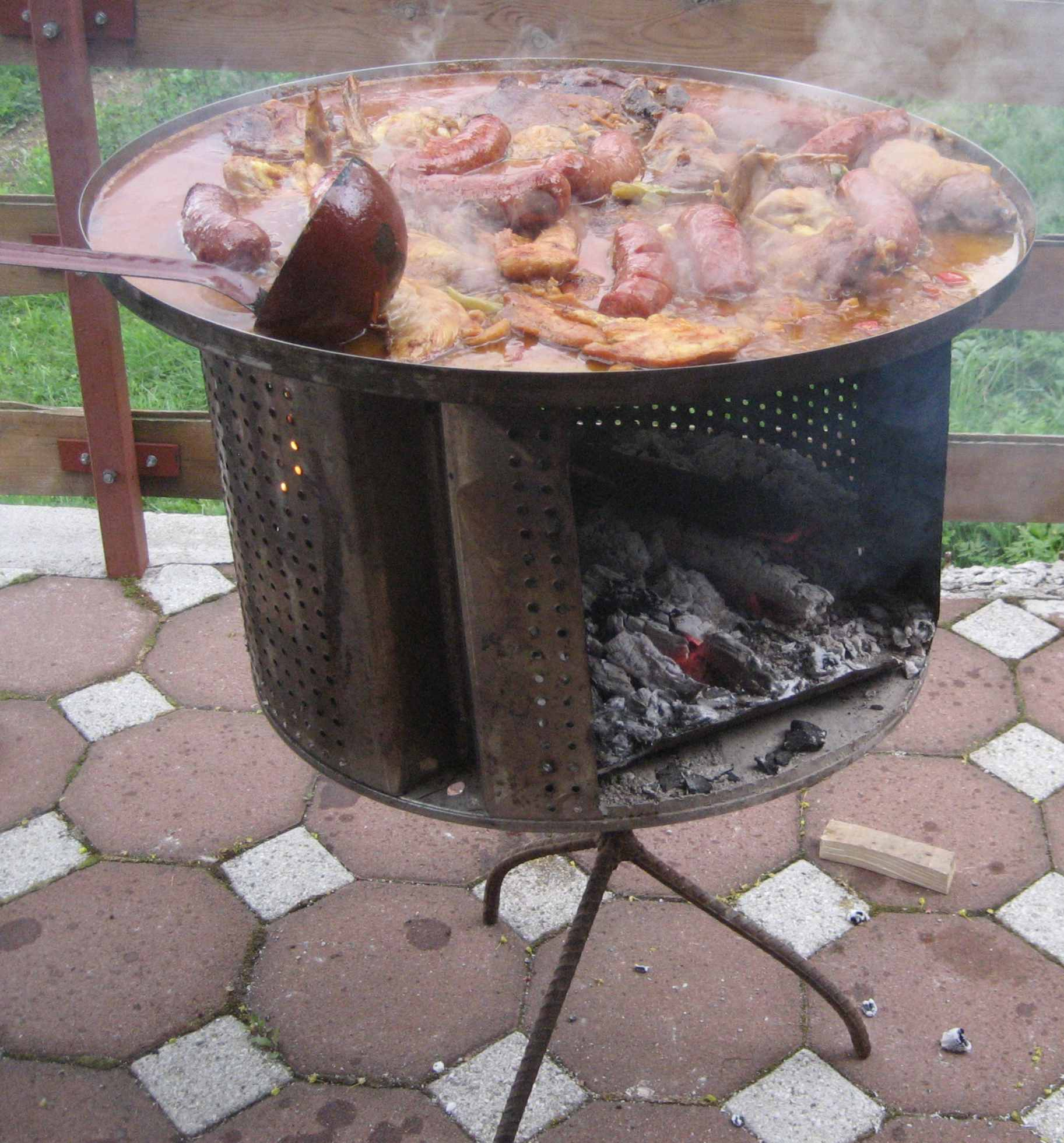
Kotlovina

Kotlovina is a Croatian fried and stewed meat dish from Zagreb and the surrounding northwest Croatia. It is a popular seasonal food eaten during spring and summer and belongs to traditional Croatian dishes.

Pork chops and sausages are fried and then stewed in their own juice, wine and various spices. Common regional garnishes are onions, potatoes, tomatoes, bell peppers and paprika.

Kotlovina has historically been prepared and served outdoors but is today a common dish served in local restaurants that serve Croatian cuisine.
