= Continental Croatia =

Former statistical region in Croatia

Continental Croatia Kontinentalna Hrvatska
- Region
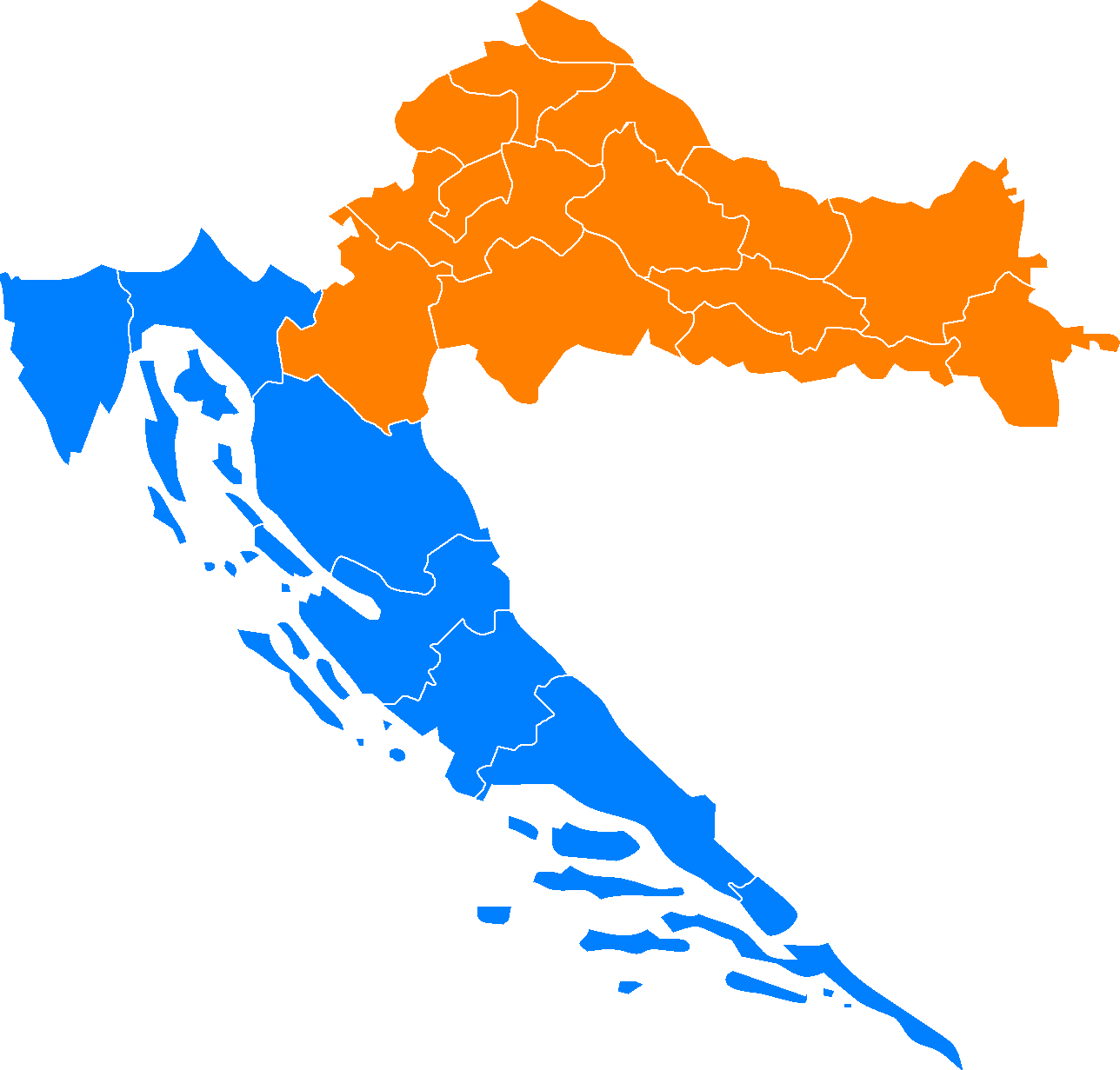
- NUTS-2 regions of Croatia, Continental Croatia in orange
- Country: Croatia

Area
  - Total: 31,889 km^{2} (12,312 sq mi)

Population
  - Total: 2,939,900
  - Density: 92.192/km^{2} (238.78/sq mi)
- NUTS code: HR04
- GDP per capita (PPS): € 19,800 (2018)

Continental Croatia (Croatian: Kontinentalna Hrvatska) was one of the two NUTS-2 Regions of Croatia between 2013 and 2021. The region formed the continental part of the country. The most populated cities in the region were Zagreb, Osijek, Slavonski Brod, Karlovac, Sisak and Varaždin. It accounted for 56% of the country's territory and 67% of the population.

The existence of this large region that included the capital city of Zagreb was controversial in Croatia at the time, with public complaints on how it enabled an unjust distribution of European Union funding.

In 2021, it was replaced with three NUTS-2 regions: City of Zagreb, Northern Croatia and Pannonian Croatia.

== See also ==
- NUTS statistical regions of Croatia
