= Frejon =

Coconut bean soup

Frejon (from Portuguese feijão 'beans') is a coconut milk and bean soup which is eaten, especially during Holy Week, by some Christians, mostly Catholics, across the world. Countries where frejon is popular include Brazil and Nigeria (especially among Yoruba who returned to Nigeria from Brazil at the abolition of the slave trade, and settled in what is known as the "Brazilian Quarters" in Lagos Island), and Sierra Leone, on Good Friday, or for functions such as weddings. Because dairy foods and flesh meat (beef, pork, goat) are strictly forbidden on Good Friday, this dish is a suitable accompaniment to non-dairy foods such as fried fish and peppered snail.

The frejon consumed in Nigeria and West Africa are puddings made of black beans cooked slowly overnight over a wood or charcoal fire, and then mixed with coconut milk to form a thick, sweet, smooth pudding. In certain countries, the dish is flavored with cocoa. Frejon is often served with fish stew, peppered snail and garri Ijebu.

== Other variations ==
- Pepper, crayfish, salt and tomatoes can be added to the mashed beans and coconut mixture.
- Sweet frejon may be made by adding sugar. It may also be chilled until it hardens, or thinned to make a drink which is served with biscuits.

== See also ==
- List of African dishes
- List of bean soups
- List of soups
