= Kulen =

Type of pork sausage

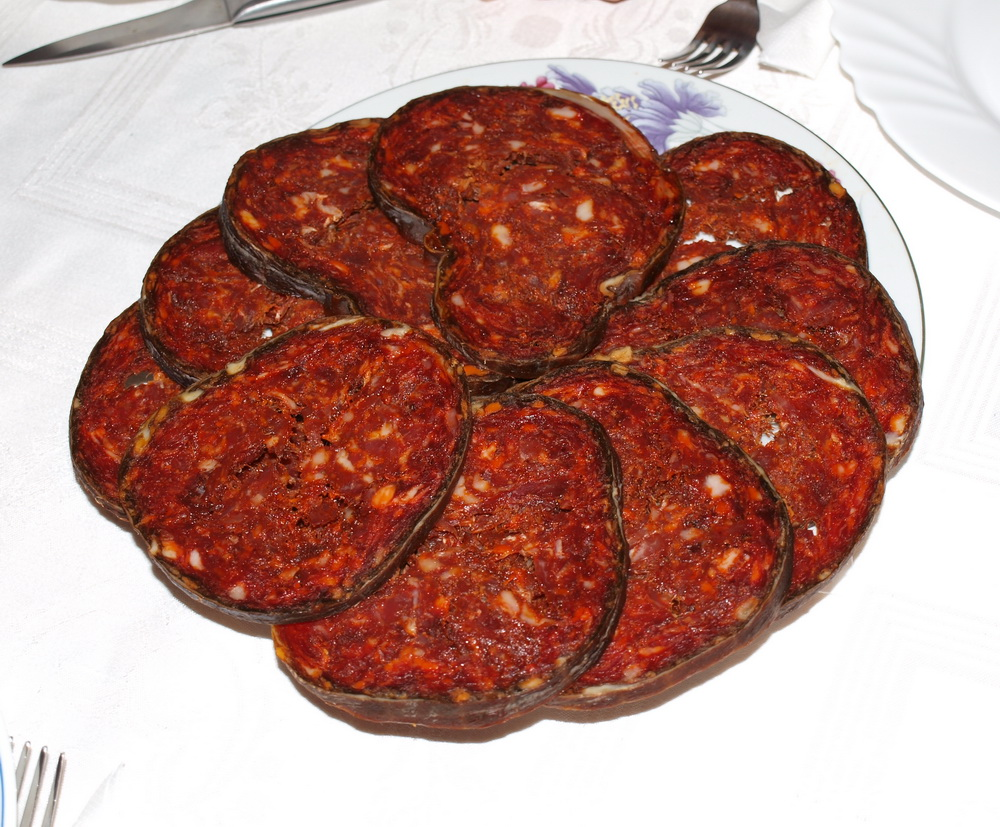
- Slices of kulen
- Alternative names: Kulin
- Type: sausage
- Course: Appetizer
- Region or state: Baranja, Bačka, Slavonia, Syrmia
- Serving temperature: cold
- Main ingredients: pork, paprika

Kulen (pronounced [kǔlen]) is a type of flavored sausage made of minced pork that is traditionally produced in Croatia (Slavonia) and Serbia (Vojvodina).

== Variants ==
A kind of kulen from Slavonia (Slavonski Kulen) has had its designation of origin protected in Croatia by an organization from Bošnjaci. In parts of Slavonia, kulen is called kulin in Ikavian accent and belongs to traditional Croatian dishes.

Croatian Baranya Kulen (Baranjski Kulen) is protected by Geographical Indication (GI) status from the Food and Agriculture Organization of the United Nations.

A kind of kulen from Syrmia has had its designation of origin protected in Serbia by an organization from Šid. There is also a local variety called Slovak kulen made predominantly in Bačka by local Slovaks.

== Description ==
The meat is low-fat, rather brittle and dense, and the flavor is spicy with the hot red paprika bringing it aroma and colour, and garlic for additional spice. The original kulen recipe does not contain black pepper; its hot flavour comes from the paprika.

The traditional time of producing kulen is during the pig slaughter done every autumn by most households. Kulen matures during the winter; it can be eaten at this time, although not fully dried and cured yet, with very hot taste, but it will develop its full taste by the following summer. To produce a dryer, firmer kulen, it is sometimes kept buried under ashes, which act as a desiccant. Kulen is a shelf-stable meat product, with a shelf life of up to two years when stored properly.

The meat is stuffed and pressed into bags made of pork intestine (usually pork appendix), and then formed into links that are usually around ten centimeters in diameter, and up to three times as long, weighing around a kilogram.

The pieces of kulen are smoked for several months, using certain types of wood. After the smoking they are air-dried for another several months. This process can last up to a year. Although similar to other air-dried procedures, the meat is fermented in addition to the air-drying. High-grade kulen is sometimes even covered with a thin layer of mold, giving it a distinct aroma.

When the kulen meat is stuffed into the small intestine, the thinness makes it require less smoking and drying and thus also takes less time to mature. This type of sausage is often referred to as kulenova seka (literally kulen's sister).

Kulen is regarded as a premium domestically-made dried meat product, given that on the Zagreb market even a low-grade kulen can cost much more than other types of sausages and is comparable to smoked ham. Although it has also been produced commercially throughout former Yugoslavia since World War II, the industrial process of production is significantly different, resulting in major differences in appearance and aroma, although it is cheap compared to the genuine kulen. However an annual "Kulenijada" festival is held in many Croatian and Serbian cities to honor the history and great regional masters of making kulen.

== Celebration ==
A regional festival of Kulen is held annually in Bački Petrovac.

== See also ==
- Croatian cuisine
- List of sausages
- List of smoked foods
- List of Croatian dishes

== Sources ==
- Kovačić, Damir; Markovina, Jerko; Prebježić, Sonja (February 2007). "Ponašanje i stavovi potrošača na zagrebačkom tržištu slavonskog kulena" [Consumer behavior and attitudes towards Slavonian Kulen on the Zagreb market] (PDF). Agronomy Journal (in Croatian). 69 (1). Croatian society of agronomists. ISSN 0002-1954.
