= Bissara =

North African dish

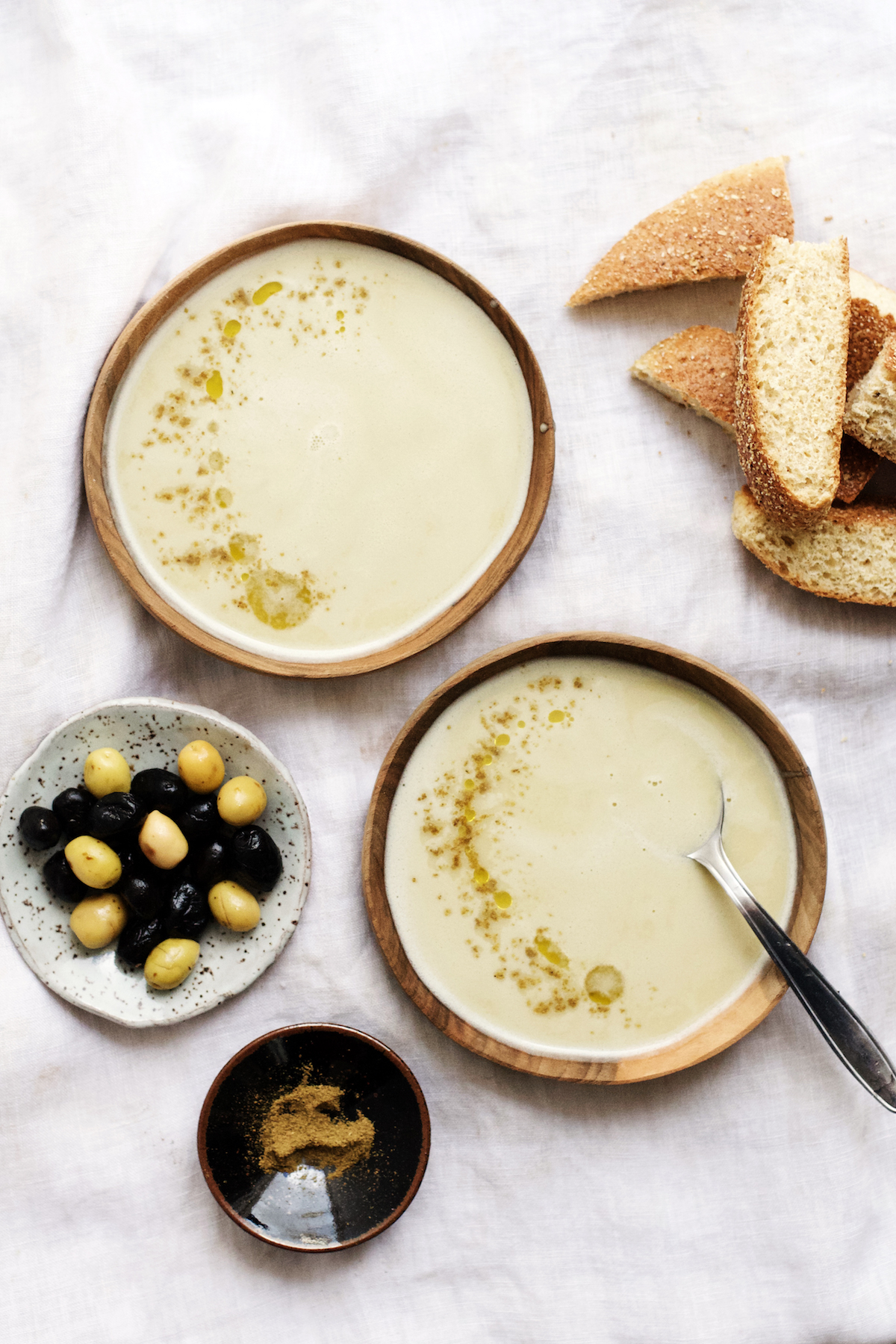
- Bissara with olives and spices
- Place of origin: Ancient Egypt
- Region or state: Greater Middle East
- Serving temperature: Hot

Bissara (Arabic: بصارة) is a dish in Egyptian and Moroccan cuisine. The dish contains split fava beans, onions, garlic, fresh aromatic herbs and spices. All ingredients are slowly cooked and then blended to yield a creamy and fragrant dip or side dish.

It is also called Talxca (ⵜⴰⵍⵅⵛⴰ) in Tashelhit, and Tamarakt (ⵜⴰⵎⴰⵔⴰⴽⵜ) in Tarifit.

== Etymology ==
Food historians believe that the name Bissara originates from the sahidic coptic word pisouro which means "cooked beans" from ⲡⲓⲥⲉ and ⲟⲩⲣⲱ.

== History ==
According to historian Daniel Newman, a 13th-century cookbook from al-Andalus contains the oldest known recipe for baysār (Arabic: بيسار), which is the ancestor to bissara, it was a porridge made with dried broad beans and meat.

In ancient Jewish cuisine, a similar dish, known as "mikpah ful" in rabbinic literature, was commonly consumed.

== Preparation ==
Bissara uses puréed broad beans as a primary ingredient. Additional ingredients include garlic, olive oil, lemon juice, hot red pepper, cumin, and salt. Bissara is sometimes prepared using split peas or chickpeas.

=== Egyptian cuisine ===
In Egypt, bissara is eaten exclusively as a dip for bread, and is served for breakfast, as a meze, or more rarely, for lunch or dinner. Egyptian bissara includes herbs or leafy greens, hot peppers, lemon juice, and occasionally onion. It is traditionally a rural farmer's dish, though it has become more popular in urban Egypt since 2011 because it is healthier than its urban counterpart, ful medames. It is typically inexpensive, and has been described as a pauper's dish.

In Egypt, bissara also includes herbs or leafy greens—particularly parsley, mint, dill, spinach, or molokhiya, though the latter is more commonly added by Egyptian expatriates in Palestine—and is eaten with bread as a dip. Bissara spread from Egypt to the Levant; Palestinians make bissara with fava beans and molokhiya.

=== Moroccan cuisine ===
In Morocco, bissara is popular during the colder months of the year and can be found in town squares and various alleyways. It is typically served in shallow bowls or soup plates, and topped with olive oil, paprika, and cumin. Bread is sometimes eaten dipped into the dish, and lemon juice is sometimes added as a topping.

=== Similar dishes ===
Tova Dickstein, an expert in ancient food, linked the ancient Jewish dish known as mikpah or mikpah ful, mentioned multiple times in rabbinic literature, to the modern bissara. Ancient sources describe it as a dip made from fava beans, garlic, mint, and olive oil. Due to its frequent appearance in the Mishnah, which also includes a halakhic rule stating that a sukkah may only be abandoned during rain once the mikpah has become wet and smelly, she referred to it as the "national dish" of the ancient Israelites.

== See also ==
- List of bean soups
- List of soups
