= Prekmurska gibanica =

Slovenian layered pastry

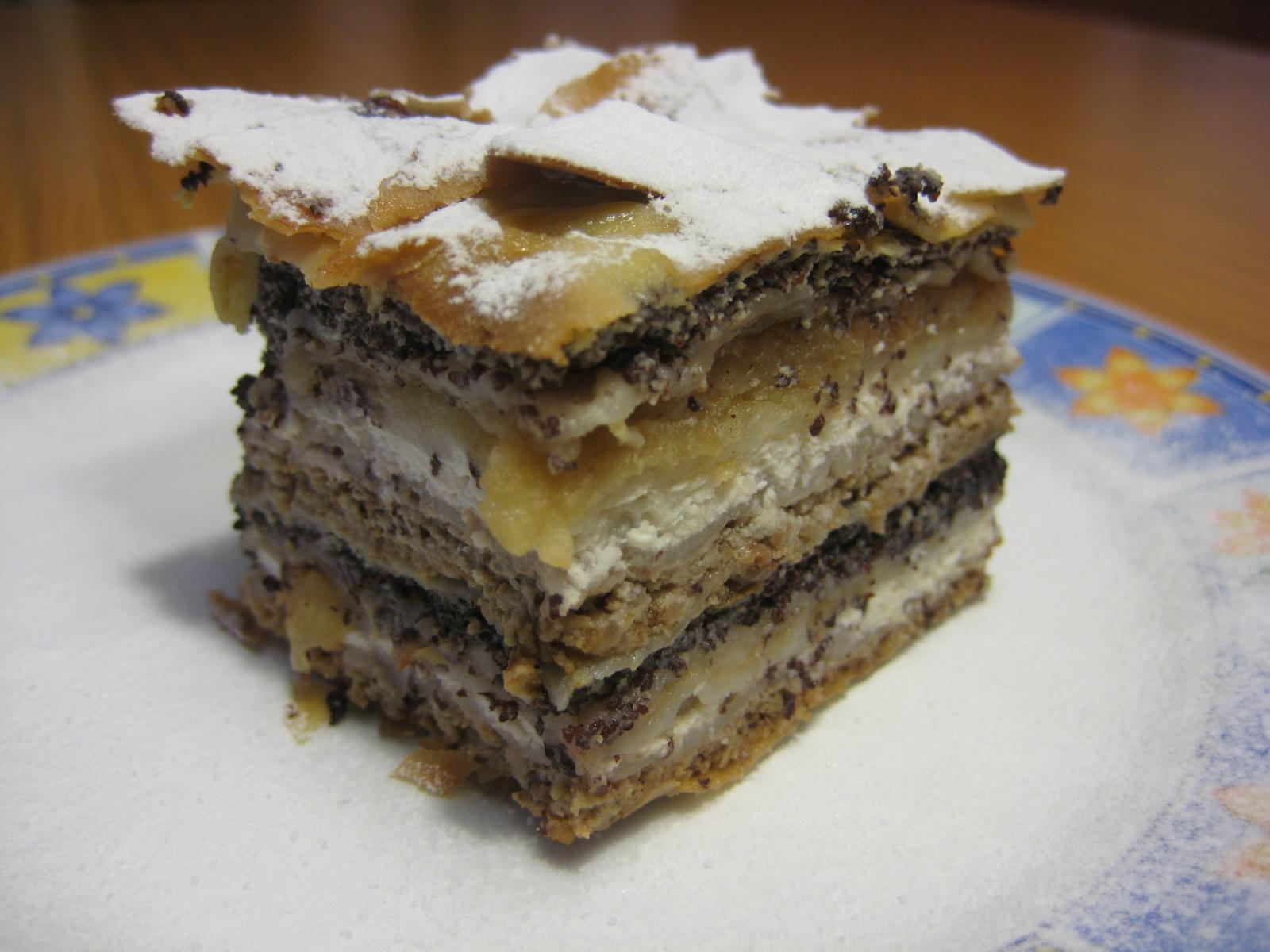
- Type: Layer pastry, gibanica
- Place of origin: Slovenia
- Region or state: Prekmurje
- Main ingredients: Flour, poppy seeds, walnuts, apples, raisins, and quark
- Other information: TSG

Prekmurska gibanica (Prekmurje layer pastry) is a type of Slovenian gibanica or layered pastry. It contains poppy seeds, walnuts, apples, raisins and quark fillings. Although native to Prekmurje, it has achieved the status of a national specialty of Slovenia. The unique sweetmeat shows the variety of agriculture in this region. The name gibanica comes from the dialect expression güba and in this case refers to a fold.

== History ==
For centuries, prekmurska gibanica was served as a festive and ritual dish in Prekmurje. The exact origin of the recipe is not clear. Early sources suggest that it evolved over centuries. The oldest extant document (1828) by József Kossics described a wedding (Prekmurje Slovene: gostüvanje) as never being held without gibanica, which is done as follows: "The dough is rolled until thin, sprinkled with grated cabbage, turnips, or quark. All is covered by second layer of dough. It is sprinkled as previously. 10 or 11 such layers are thus composed and form a conspicuous cake [sic]."

Prekmurska gibanica was chosen to represent Slovenia in the Café Europe initiative of the Austrian presidency of the European Union, on Europe Day 2006. Since March 2010, prekmurska gibanica is protected in the EU as a Traditional Speciality Guaranteed.

== Protection regime ==
- Traditional specialities guaranteed (TSG) in the European Union

== See also ==
- Međimurska gibanica: a similar but less elaborate type of gibanica from a neighboring region of Croatia, using a simpler recipe
- Slovenian cuisine
