= Turoš =

Type of cheese

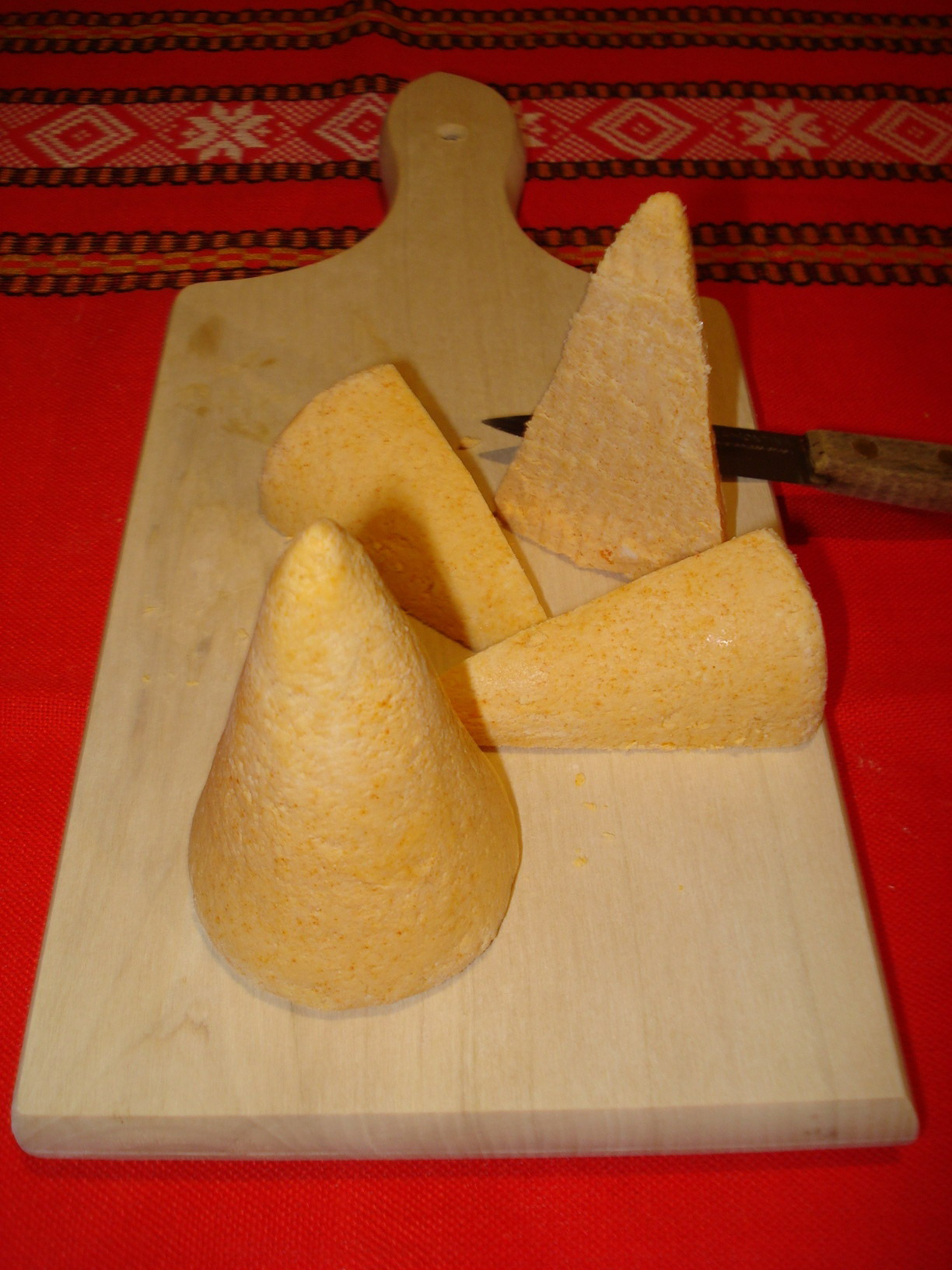
Turoš - traditionally served

Turoš is a type of cheese made from cattle's milk. It is a traditional food in the north Croatian region of Međimurje.

Turoš is made by cone-shaping chunks of cottage cheese, with the addition of salt and red paprika. Because it is spiced with red paprika, the cheese is usually light orange or apricot in colour. The height of the cones is usually around 6 centimetres. Upon shaping, the cheese is left to dry in smoke or sunlight over a few days.

The name turoš comes from the homophonous Hungarian word túrós, meaning "of cottage cheese" or "of curd cheese". Túró is the Hungarian noun for both "cottage cheese" and "curd cheese".

== See also ==
- Croatian cuisine
- List of cheeses
- List of Croatian dishes
