= Croatian bean soup =

Grahova pretepena juha
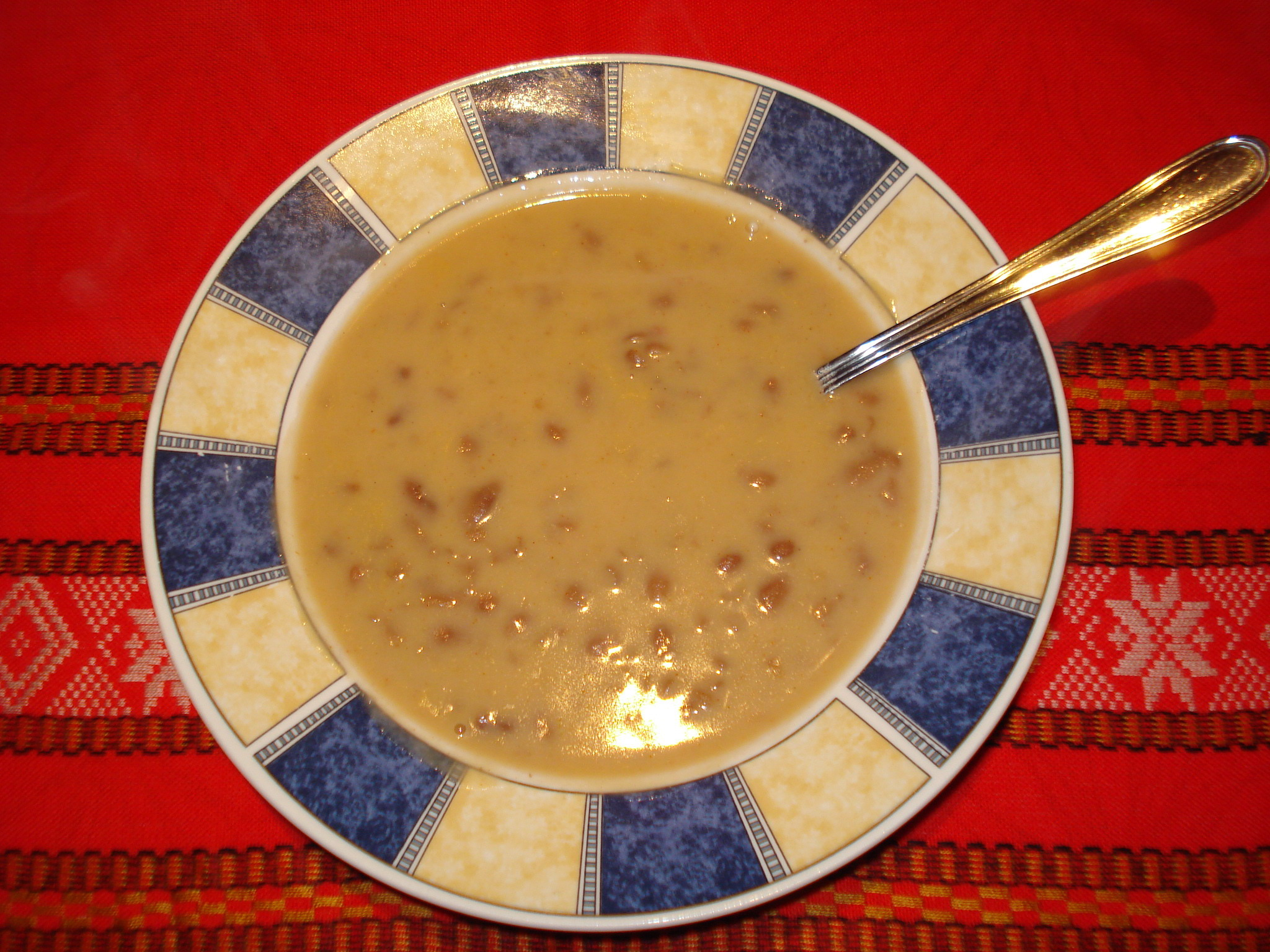
- Grahova pretepena juha, served on a plate
- Alternative names: Pretepeni grah
- Type: Soup
- Place of origin: Međimurje County
- Region or state: Croatia
- Serving temperature: warm
- Main ingredients: beans, flour, milk, sour cream, salt, water or soup stock, vinegar, oil, garlic, Vegeta, laurel, black pepper, white pepper

Croatian bean soup or grahova pretepena juha is a type of traditional thick bean soup from Međimurje cuisine, an integral part of the national Croatian cuisine. It is a bean soup with added stirred flour mixed with milk and cream, especially popular in parts of Northern Croatia. Traditionally it is also called "bean with cream" or "white bean soup", with minor differences in ingredients and preparation. This liquid dish of the original recipe is prepared from beans, as the main ingredient, and other ingredients and additives: flour, milk, sour cream, salt, water or soup stock, vinegar, oil, garlic, Vegeta, laurel, black pepper and other spices according to desire and taste. The most used varieties of beans can be cranberry, bolita, navy or kidney.

== Preparation and serving ==
The preparation of the dish begins the day before, when the beans are placed in a container (bowl) with cold water, where it remains for at least a few hours or overnight to become soaked. After the water is changed on the second day, the beans are cooked in a pot until soft. Then the so-called "pretep", a mixture of sour cream, flour and a little milk, is added, whereby the flour is whipped into cream or milk. The other ingredients are added and everything is cooked a little longer, until it reaches the appropriate density. All the ingredients that are added to the beans, except laurel, are chopped before putting them in the pot. If the dish is too thick, it can be diluted with water as desired and boiled for a while (next 10–15 minutes). At the end a little vinegar can be added. It is served hot in a suitable bowl and eaten with bread, and according to taste, with chopped onion or other foodstuffs.

== See also ==
- List of Croatian dishes
- List of bean soups
- List of legume dishes
- Cream soups
