= Fisherman's soup =

Hungarian fish soup

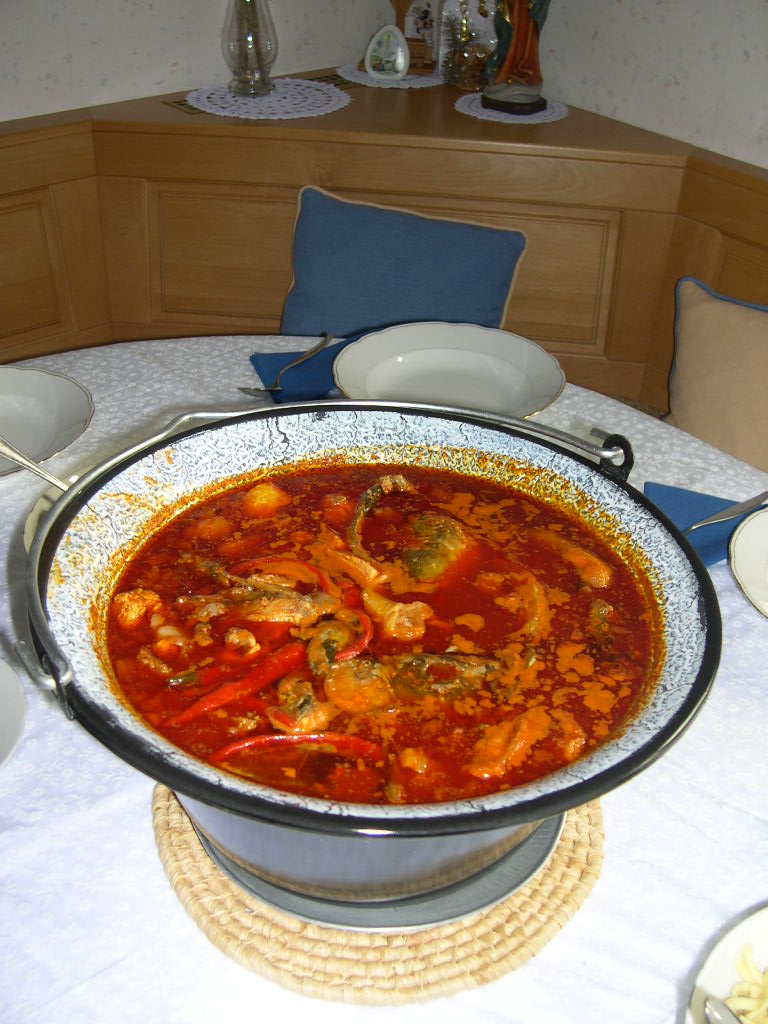
- A pot of Halászlé
- Alternative names: Halászlé
- Type: Soup
- Place of origin: Hungary, Serbia, Croatia
- Serving temperature: Hot
- Main ingredients: Fish (carp or mixed river fish), paprika, vegetables (red onions, green peppers, tomatoes)

Fisherman's soup or halászlé (Hungarian pronunciation: [ˈhɒlaːsleː]) is a hot, spicy paprika-based fish soup. A folk item of Hungarian cuisine, it is a bright-red hot dish prepared with generous amounts of hot paprika and carp or mixed river fish. It is native to the Pannonian Plain, particularly the Danube and Tisza river regions. It is also a popular dish among Danube Swabians and their descendants, known as Karpfensuppe. In Croatia, it is commonly served in the regions of Slavonia and Baranya, where it is called riblji paprikaš, fiš or fiš paprikaš.

With its ample use of hot paprika and, often, hot peppers, halászlé is one of the spiciest dishes native to the European continent.

== Preparation ==
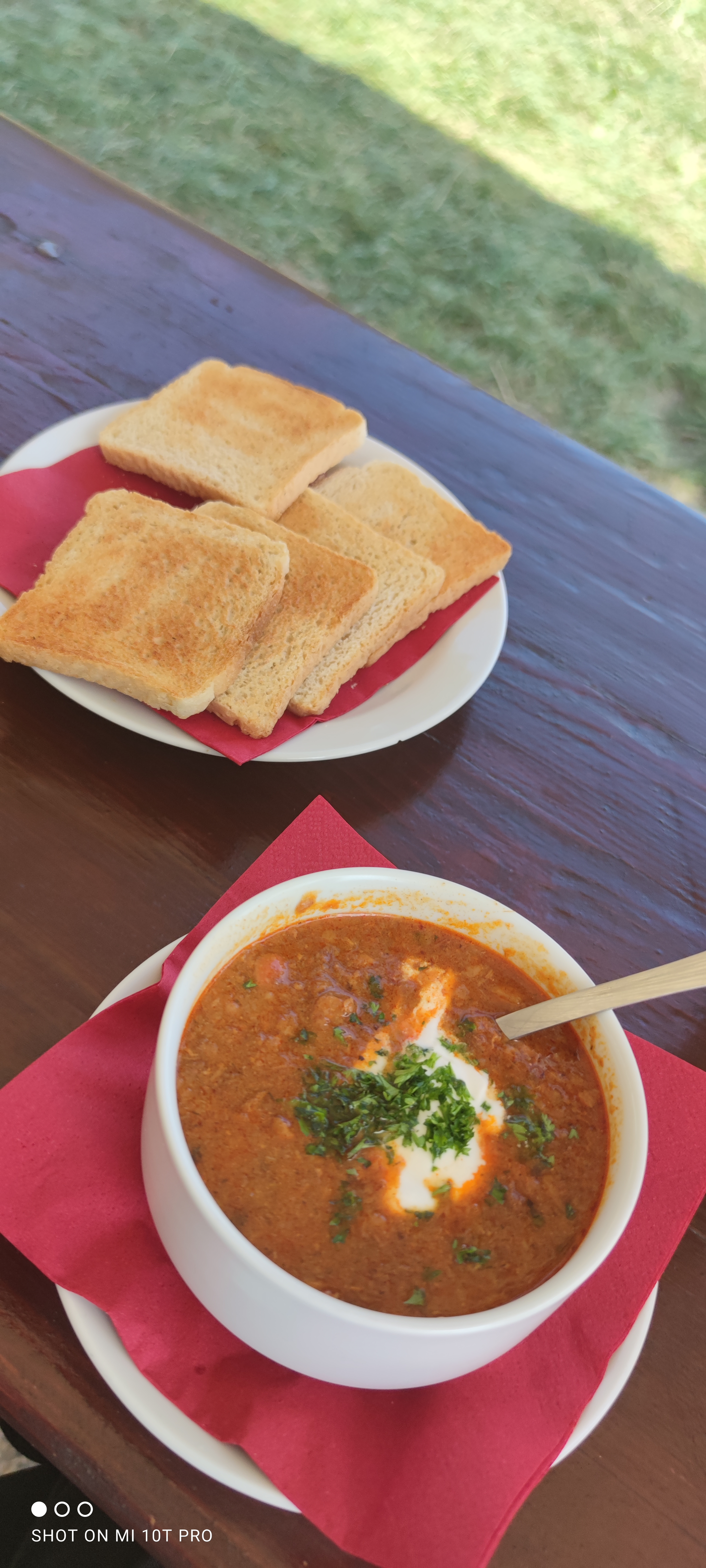
Fish soup (halászle) in the restaurant U vodníka

Halászlé is a traditional soup enjoyed both by locals and famed with tourists. An important ingredient is a broth made of fish trimmings such as fresh carp heads, bones, skin and fins simmered with vegetables that may include red onions, green peppers and tomatoes for two hours. It is then strained, and ten minutes before serving hot ground paprika and two finger-thick carp fillets, the roe and coral are added to the boiling soup.

Variations include:

- Fisherman's soup a la Szeged. with carp, catfish, sturgeon and either pike or perch in a ratio of 1.5 pound (800 g): 1 pound (500 g): 0.5 pound (350 g): and 0.5 pound (350 g).
- Fisherman's soup a la Paks, with homemade thin-cut Hungarian Spätzle called csipetke.
- Fisherman's soup a la Baja, with 75% carp, served with homemade thick-cut Spätzle called gyufatészta.

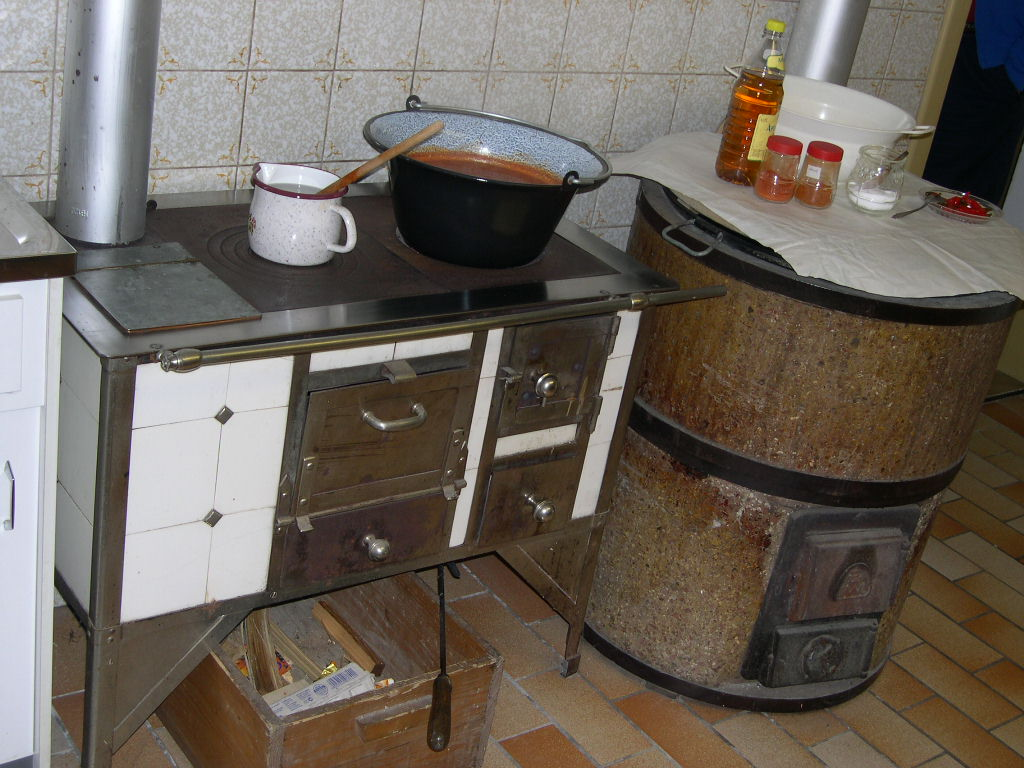
Pot of halászlé simmering on wood stove

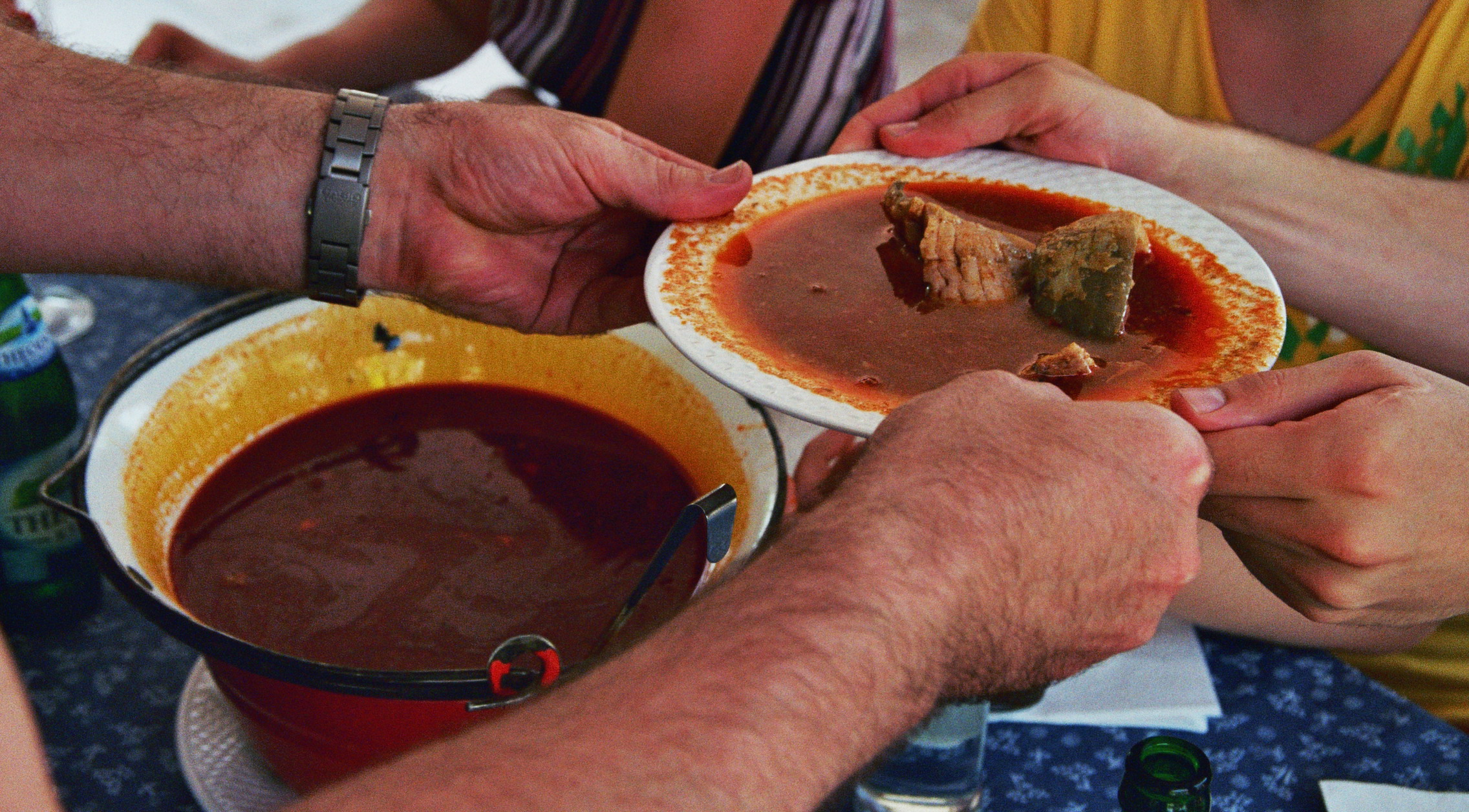
Halászlé as served in Szeged, Hungary

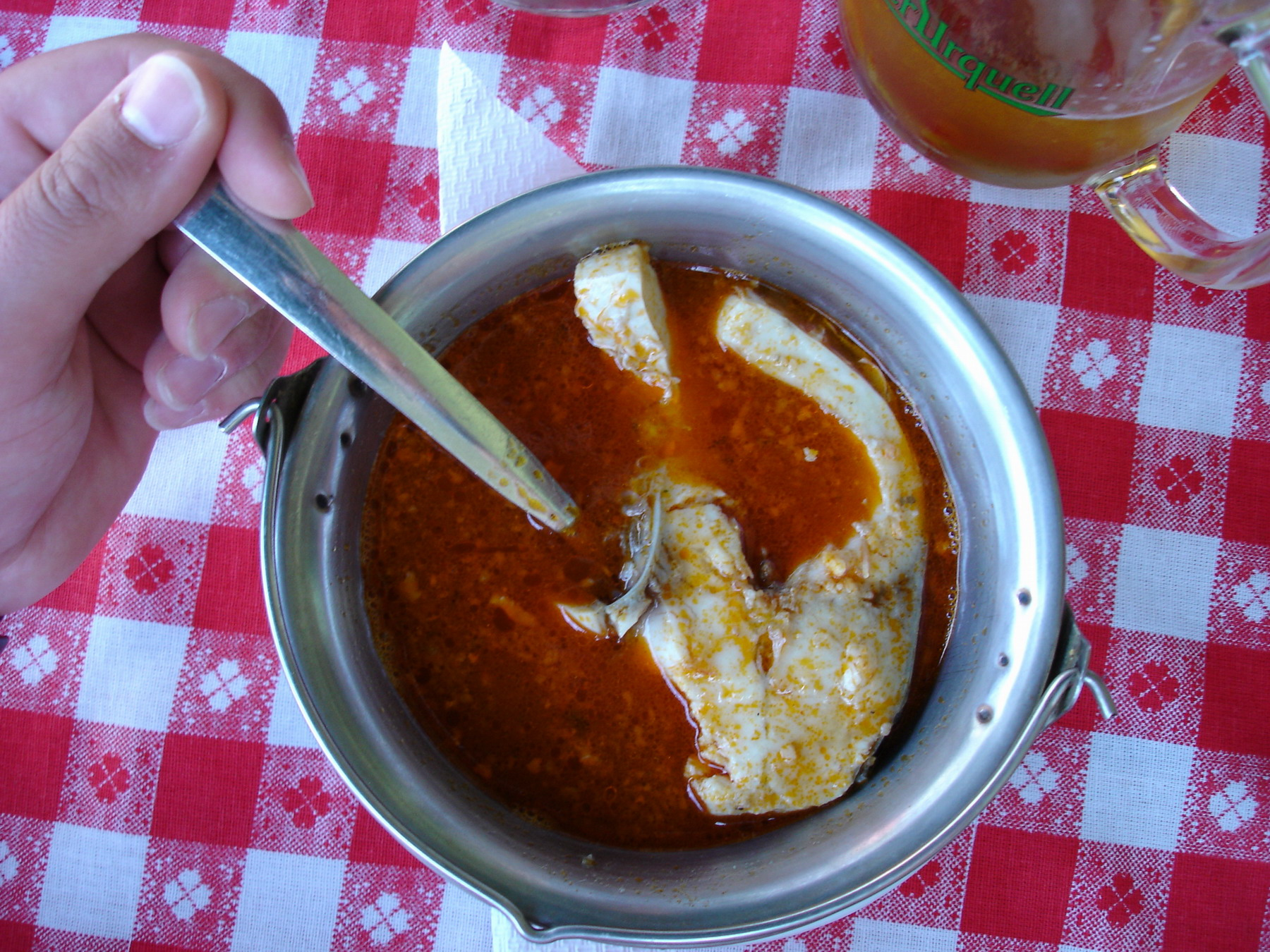
Bowl of halászlé with carp

Traditionally, fishermen prepare the soup in small kettles on open fire on the river banks. When prepared in kettles, chopped onion is fried in the kettle with oil until it is caramelized. Then, ground paprika is added and the kettle is filled with water. When the water comes to a boil, other seasonings (such as black pepper, white wine, vinegar, or tomato juice) are added, and finally the fish, chopped into large pieces. Entire fish, including heads and tails, are often added to the soup.

The soup is usually prepared with mixed fish, most commonly carp, catfish, perch and pike. It is famous for being very hot and spicy.

When prepared on-site the soup is served directly from the kettle and eaten with bread.

Competitions in preparing the soup are popular and are usually held at fairs along river coasts.

White wine (such as Riesling) is served with halászlé. Diluted with soda water it forms a sort of spritzer, called fröccs in Hungarian.

Halászlé is a traditional dish for Christmas Eve dinner in Hungary.

== See also ==
- Ukha, Russian fish soup
- Bouillabaisse, French fish soup
- Maeun-tang
- List of soups
- List of Croatian dishes
