= Soparnik =

Dalmatian pie

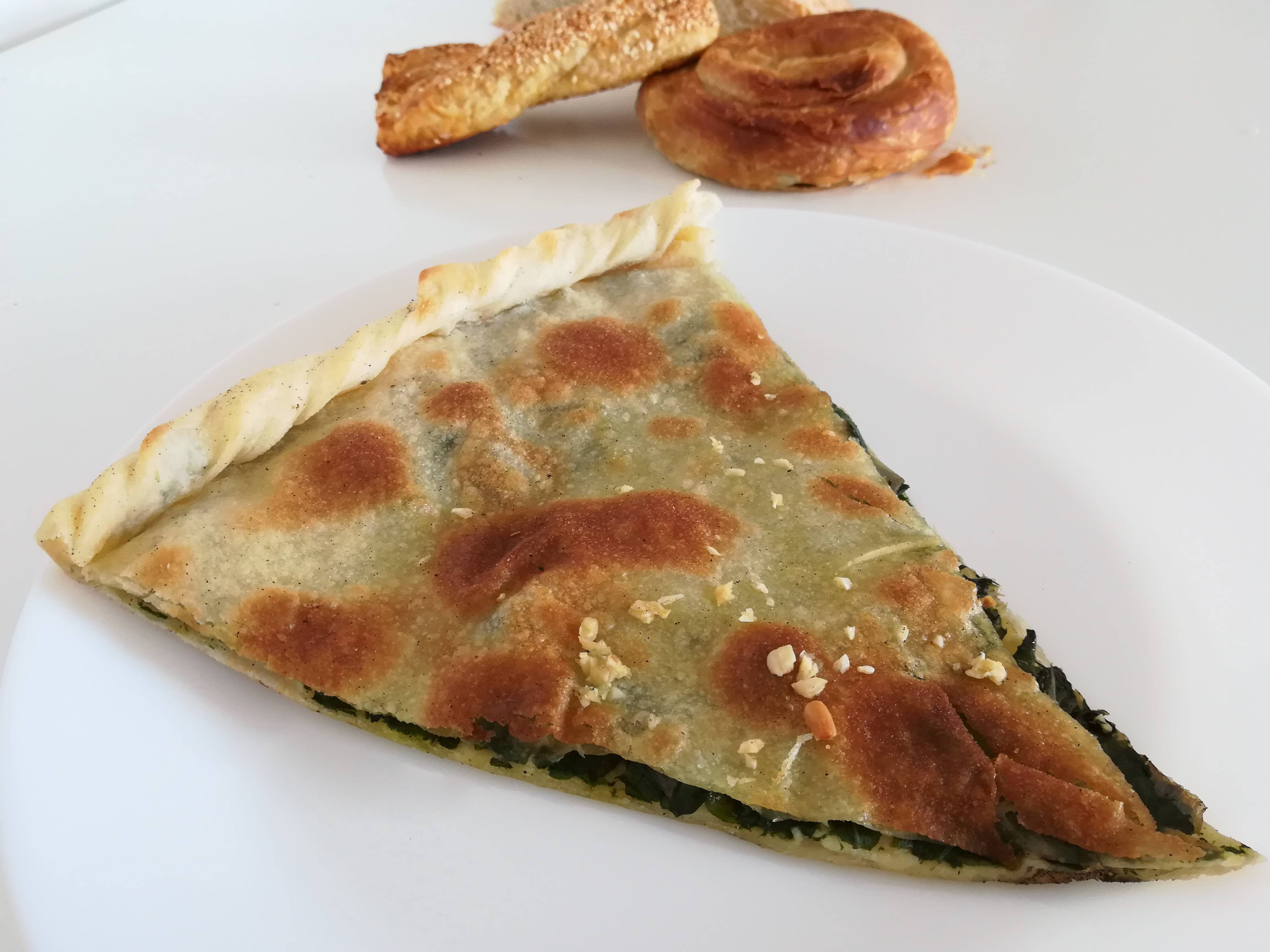
Sliced soparnik

Soparnik is a traditional Croatian dish. It is usually a savoury pie with a filling of Swiss chard and onion. Other names are soparnjak, zeljanik or uljenjak. It is the most famous speciality of the Dalmatian region of Poljica, between Split and Omiš. The original season for the dish was the colder time of the year when older, sweeter chard was available. In the past, it was prepared as a fasting dish and for celebrations.

Soparnik is a simple dish made from common ingredients from the region: chard with garlic and olive oil between two thin sheets of unleavened dough made from the finest flour. It is baked on the stone of a hot open hearth (komin), while being covered with fine embers and ash. Among the numerous local variations there are also sweet ones, for example with nuts, dried fruits or cinnamon.

The preparation method of the soparnik is a protected intangible cultural heritage of Croatia. In 2016, the European Commission entered the dish in the register of protected designations of origin and protected geographical indications.

== History ==
The dish is dated to about 13th century. It was probably created under an oriental influence, parts of which can be seen in the naming of the dish after Turkish sopa for stick (rolling pin), and the round board for rolling the dough called sinija, from Turkish sini for tray.

Today it is used as a cultural trademark and sold increasingly on markets and in restaurants and found on events and festivals. A soparnik-dedicated festival is held in the municipality of Dugi Rat. There is also a "Poljički soparnik" society ("Udruga ‘Poljički soparnik’").

== Preparation ==
Preparation

The chard leaves are washed and strained well to prevent the thin dough from becoming soggy. For that purpose they can be left spread out over night and some flour may be added. The chard may be stripped of stems and is cut into strips. Then chopped onions, olive oil and salt are mixed in. In some regions parsley or chopped cabbage are added.

The dough is made from flour, some salt, some olive oil and water as needed. It is divided into two equal parts and put to rest. The first part is spread to a very thin, circle-shaped layer (2 to 3 millimetres thick) on a flour-dusted board called sinija. This is evenly covered with filling, except for a small margin. The other half of the dough is spread in the same manner to form the top of the pie. It is wrapped around the rolling pin and unrolled onto the rest of the pie. The overlapping layers of dough are joined by rolling them into a rim. To ease the tricky transfer onto the baking hearth the pie may be sprinkled with polenta as a release agent before it is flipped over.

Traditionally, soparnik is baked on a well-heated heath, the so-called komin, and is covered with embers. When the upper layer produces bubbles from the steam of the filling, the pie is pierced. It is baked for about 15 to 20 minutes (in an oven at 200 °C) until the filling is fully cooked and the fireplace poker gives a rustling sound when scuffing the top (or the dough is brown). After that, it is taken out, swept clean and flipped over again. After cooling it is drizzled with olive oil with finely chopped garlic. It is usually cut into rhomboid pieces for serving.

== See also ==
- Croatian cuisine
- List of pies, tarts and flans
