= List of bean soups =

List of notable bean soups

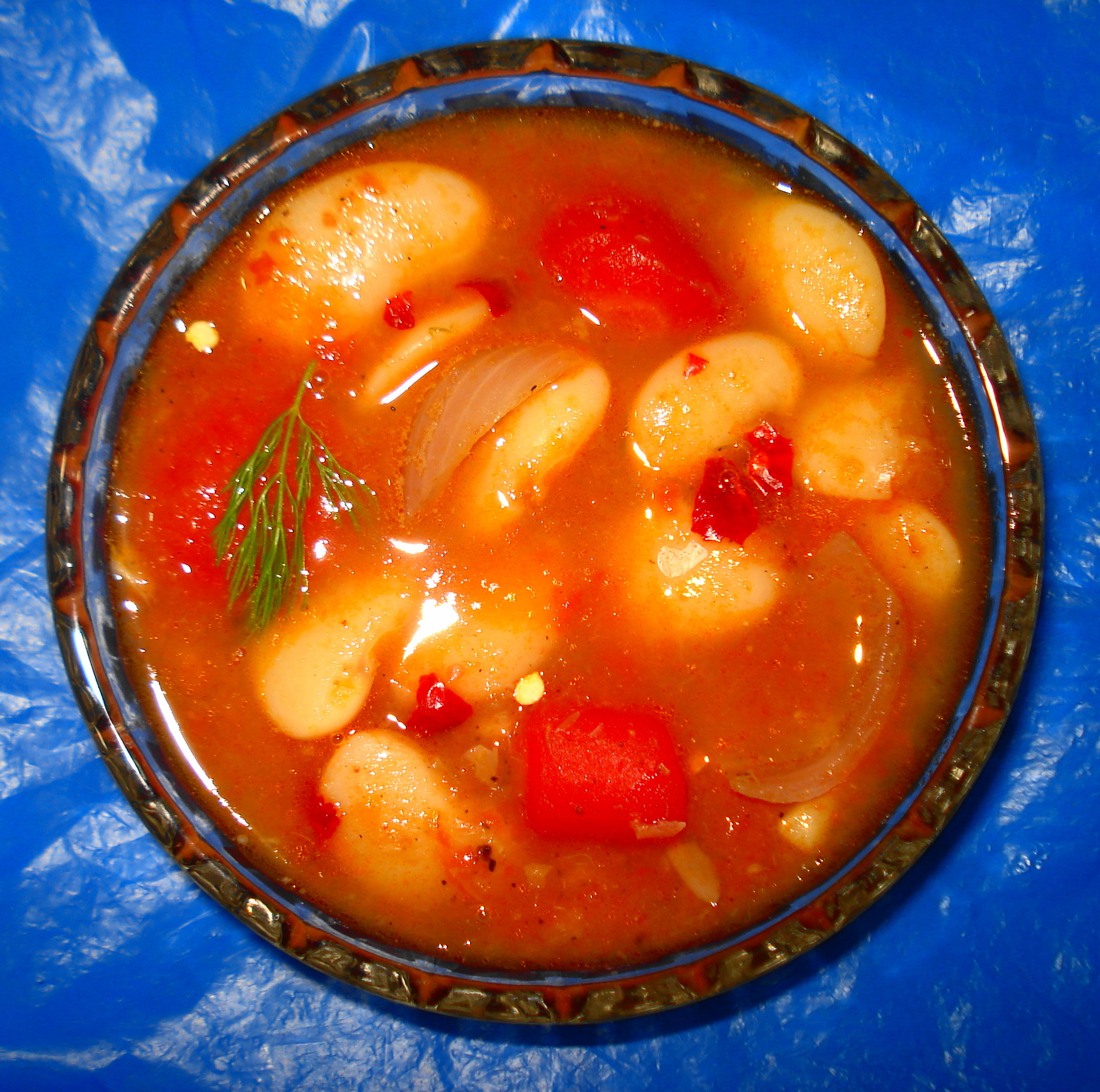
Fasolada, a Greek and Cypriot soup of dry white beans, olive oil, and vegetables

This is a list of notable bean soups characterized by soups that use beans as a primary ingredient.

== Bean soups ==
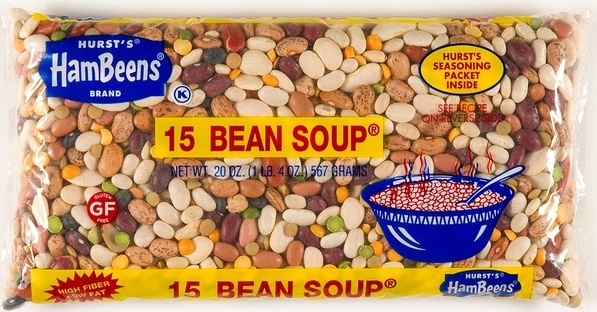
15 Bean Soup

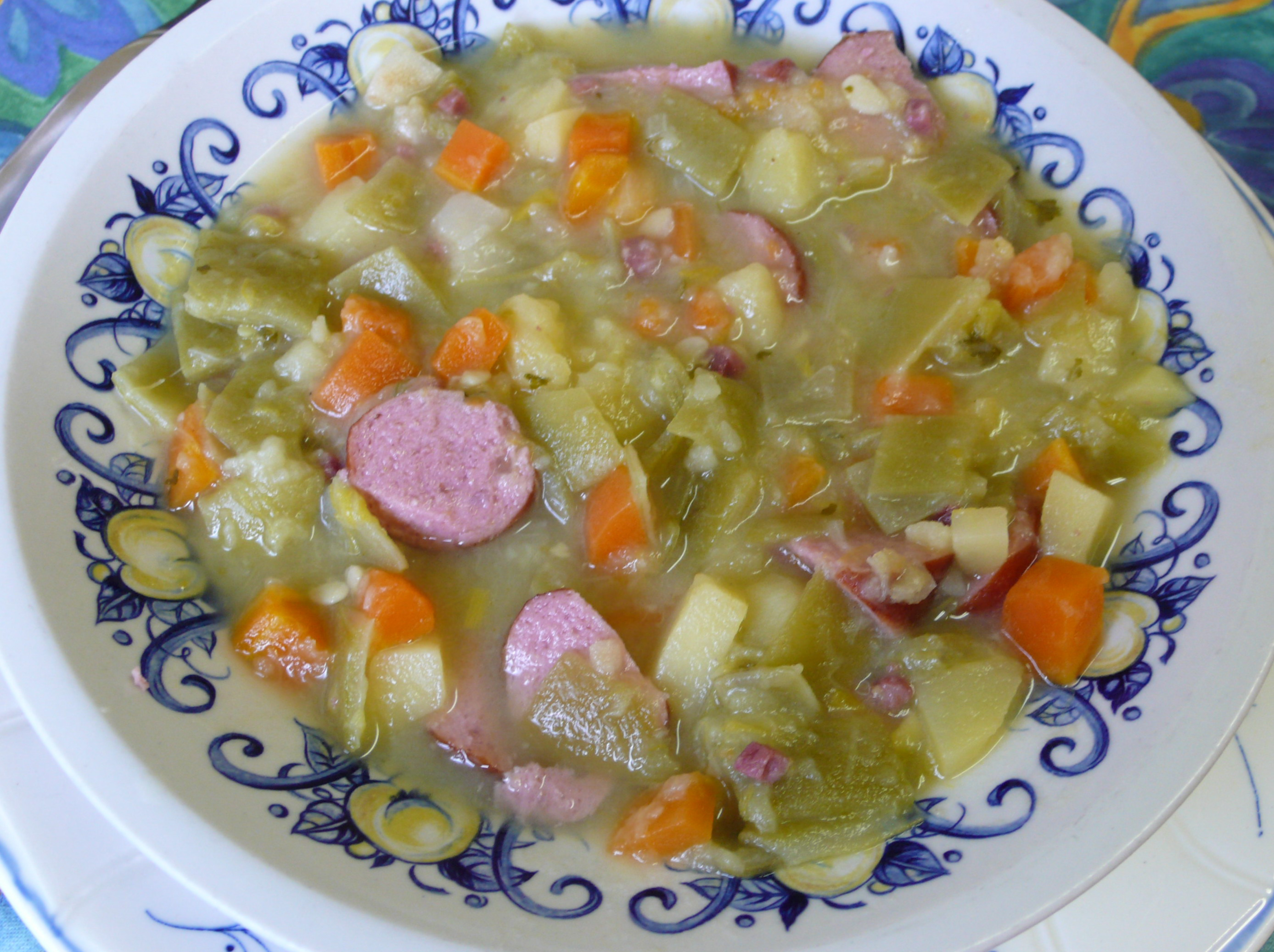
Bouneschlupp

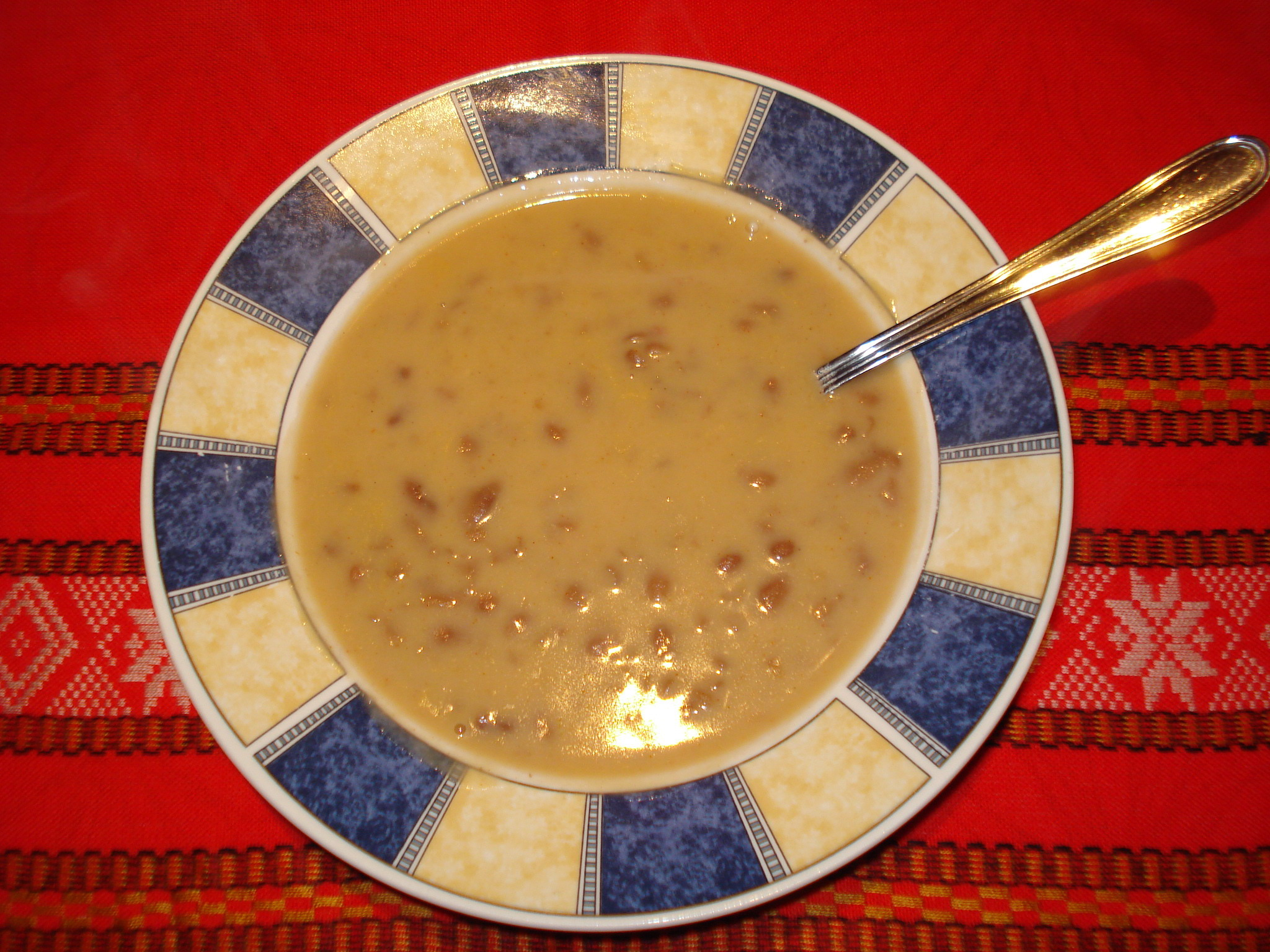
Pretepeni grah

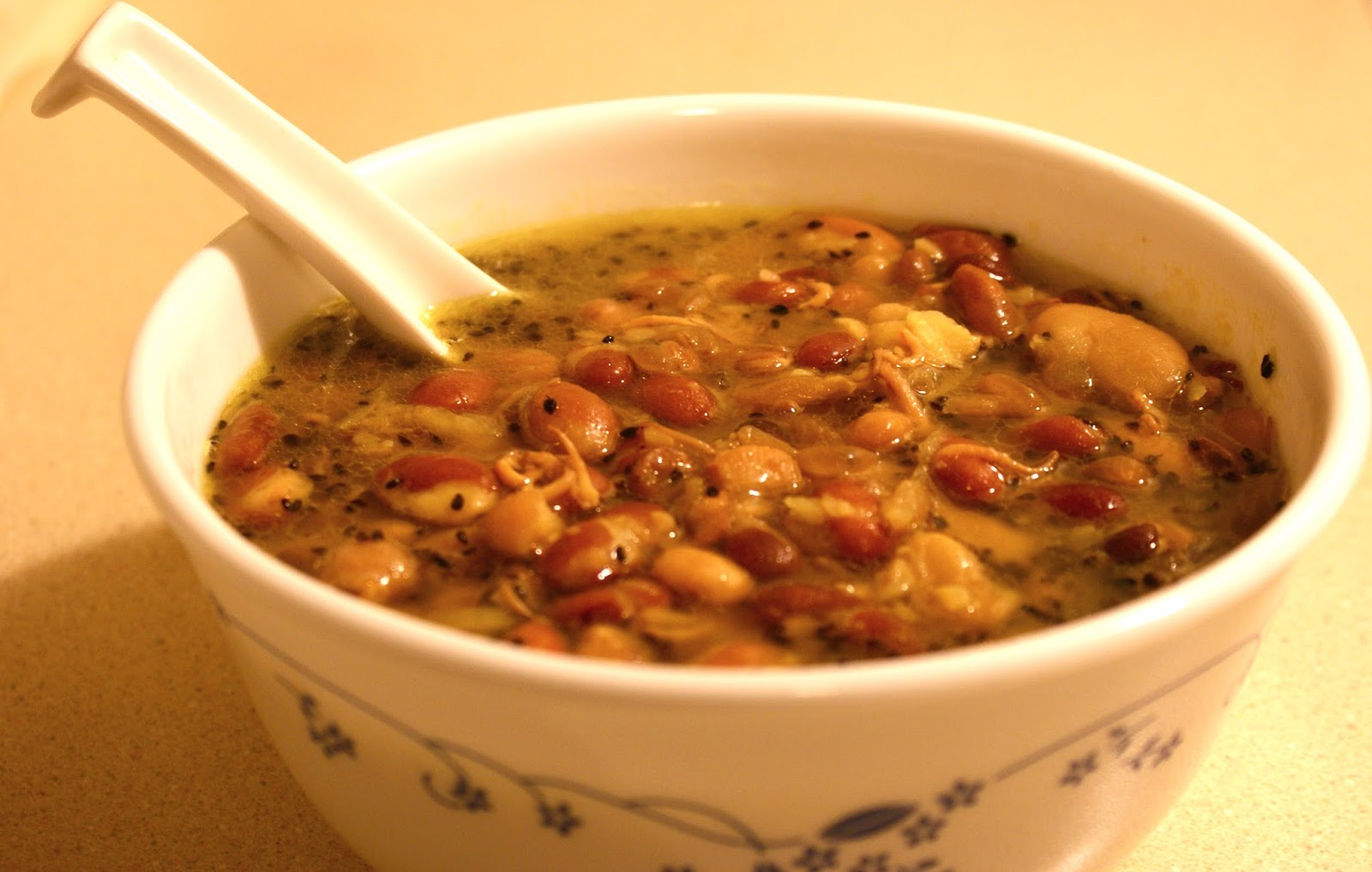
Kwati

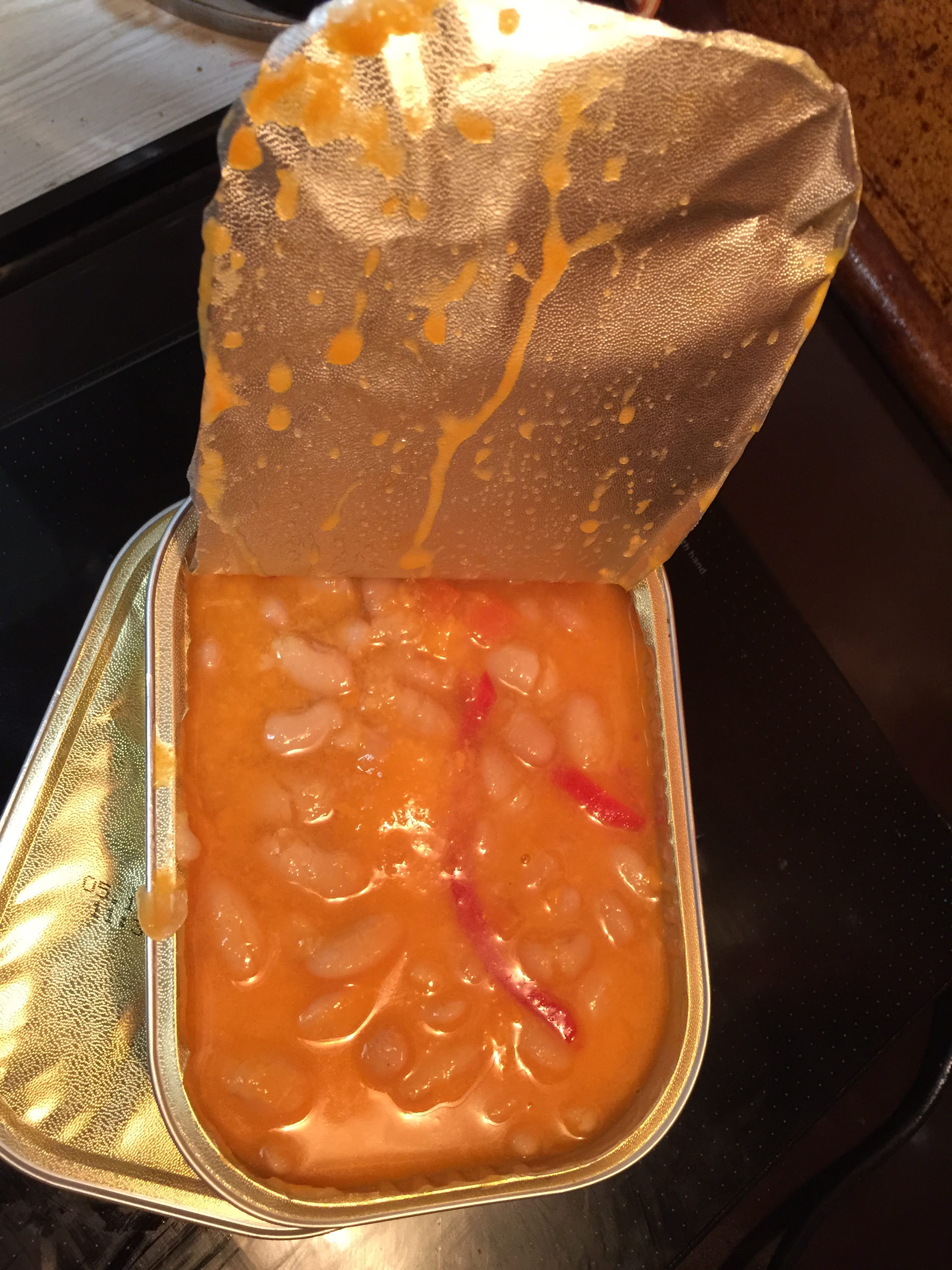
Ready-made bean dishes

- 15 Bean Soup – A packaged dry bean soup mix produced by the N.K. Hurst Co. in Indiana. According to company president Rick Hurst, it is the #1 selling dry bean soup in the U.S. Needham Hurst founded his dry goods company in 1938, expanding into dried beans in 1947, and it's still owned by the 4th generation of the family, in 2026. The soup contains at least 15 varieties of dried pulses, and flavors.
- Asopao de gandules – A thick soup from Puerto Rico made with pigeon peas (gandules), sofrito, pork, squash, various spices and dumpling made from green bananas, potato, rice flour, yautía, and parsley.
- Amish preaching soup – Typically served preceding or following Amish church services in American cuisine.
- Bissara – A soup and a bean dip in African cuisine, prepared with dried, puréed broad beans as a primary ingredient.
- Bob chorba – A national Bulgarian dish, translating to "bean soup," prepared using dried beans, onions, tomatoes, chubritza, or dzhodzhen (spearmint) and carrots.
- Bouneschlupp – A traditional Luxembourgish green bean soup with potatoes, bacon, and onions
- Dal – A term used for lentils, a dish of cooked lentils, and lentil soup on the Indian subcontinent
- Fasolada – A Greek, Levantine, and Cypriot soup of dry white beans, olive oil, and vegetables, sometimes called the "national food of the Greeks".
- Fazulnica or Fazulovica (dialectally also Fyzulnačka) – A Moravian and Slovak popular soup made from smoked meat broth, lard, onion, garlic, marjoram, brown beans, and peppers. Add cut smoked and boiled meat and beans.
- Frejon – A bean and coconut milk soup, consumed by some Christians on Good Friday in various areas of the world
- Frijoles charros - A soup from Mexico made of pinto beans, onion, garlic, and bacon. Other common ingredients include chili peppers, tomatoes, cilantro, ham, sausage, pork and chorizo.
- Ful medames – Fava beans stew served with vegetable oil, cumin, and optionally with chopped parsley, garlic, onion, lemon juice, and chili pepper. It is a staple food in Egypt and a common part of the cuisines of many Middle Eastern and African cultures.
- Grahova pretepena juha – a type of traditional thick bean soup from Međimurje cuisine, an integral part of the national Croatian cuisine
- Hong dou tang – Or red bean soup is a popular Chinese dish served in Mainland China, Hong Kong, and Taiwan. It is categorized as a tang shui (literally translated as sugar water), or sweet soup.
- Istrian stew
- Jókai bean soup – A Hungarian soup prepared using pinto beans
- Kwati – A mixed soup prepared using nine types of sprouted beans, it is a traditional Nepalese dish consumed on the festival of Gun Punhi, the full moon day of Gunlā which is the tenth month in the Nepal Era lunar calendar.
- Pasulj – A bean soup made of usually white beans, cranberry beans or pinto beans, and more rarely kidney beans, that is common in Serbian, Montenegrin, Bosnian, Croatian, Albanian, and Slovenian cuisines. It is a common winter dish, and is typically prepared with meat, particularly smoked meat such as smoked bacon, sausage, and ham hock.
- Pasta fagioli – An Italian soup of pasta and beans
- Pea soup
- Senate bean soup – Served in the dining room of the United States Senate every day, in a tradition that dates back to the early 20th century. It is prepared using navy beans, ham hocks, and onion.
- Red peas soup – A Jamaican soup prepared using coconut milk, kidney beans, salted meat, root vegetables, herbs and spices.
- Zuppa toscana – Containing cannellini beans

== See also ==
- List of legume dishes
- List of soups
- Soup beans – A bean dish
