= Garlic sausage =

Type of sausage

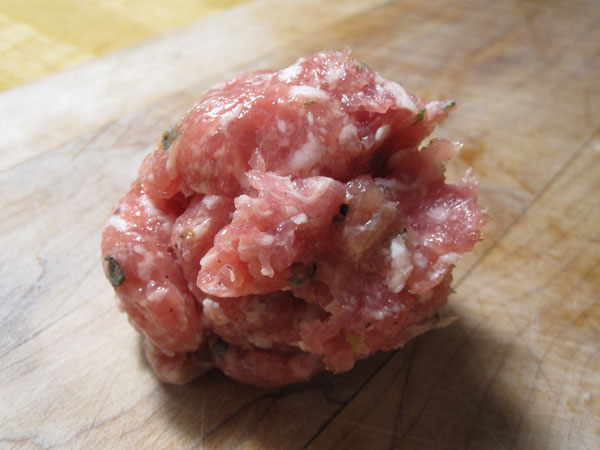
Homemade garlic sage breakfast sausage

Garlic sausage is a type of meat sausage prepared using garlic as a primary ingredient. It is prepared using pork or beef/veal, or a combination of pork and beef. It can be prepared using fresh or dried garlic, including dried granulated garlic.

Garlic sausage is a part of French cuisine. In the United States, knackwurst, also referred to as knoblauch, is prepared using ground pork, veal, and fresh garlic.

== See also ==
- List of garlic dishes
- List of sausages
- Gyoza
