= Northern Croatia =

Coordinates: 46.308°N 16.336°E

Northern Croatia Sjeverna Hrvatska
- Region
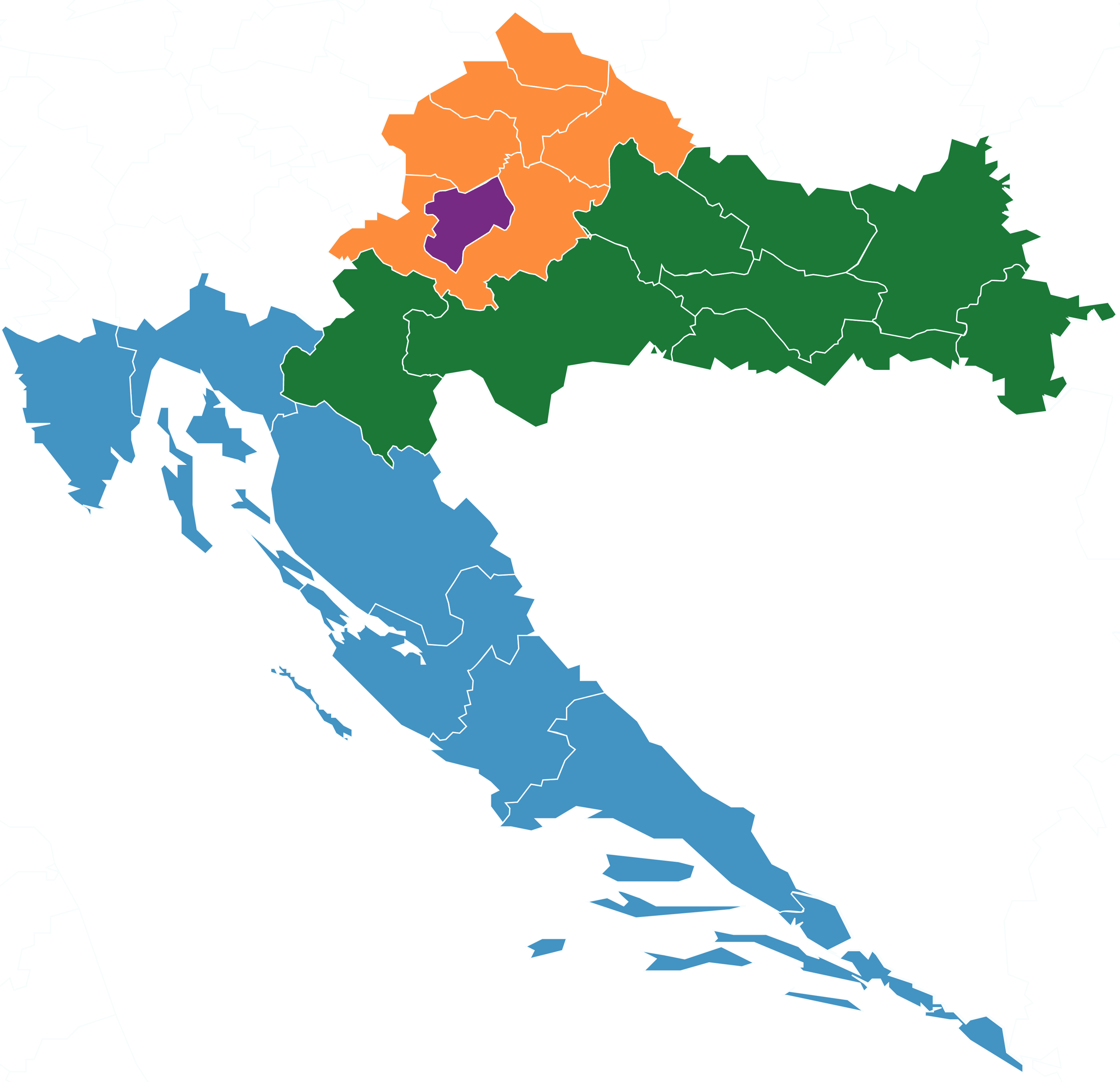
- Map of the NUTS statistical regions of Croatia with the Northern Croatia NUTS-2 region indicated in orange and the City of Zagreb NUTS-2 region indicated separately in purple.
- Country: Croatia

Area
  - Total: 8,028 km^{2} (3,100 sq mi)

Population (2020)
  - Total: 812,067
  - Density: 101.2/km^{2} (262.0/sq mi)

GDP
  - Total: €14.400 billion (2024)
  - Per capita: €18,182 (2024)
- NUTS code: HR06

Map of geographical North Croatia (yellow)

Northern Croatia or North Croatia (Croatian: Sjeverna Hrvatska, pronounced [sjêʋeːrnaː xř̩ʋaːtskaː]) refers to the northern parts of Croatia, encompassing Zagreb, Varaždin, Međimurje, Zagorje and Koprivnica-Križevci counties, including the cities of Zagreb, Varaždin, Čakovec, Krapina, Koprivnica and Križevci. The region is home to the Kajkavian dialect, which some consider to be a separate language of its own. The region borders Hungary to its north-east and Slovenia to its north-west.

== Status ==
The term had not been used in official capacity until recently. Until 2012, the region's borders coincided with the NUTS-2 region Northwest Croatia (Sjeverozapadna Hrvatska in Croatian). This NUTS-2 region was then merged with Central and Eastern Croatia (Središnja i Istočna Hrvatska) forming the NUTS-2 region Continental Croatia. As of 2021, the NUTS-2 region of "Northern Croatia" was established again, which contains all of Northern Croatia with the exception of Zagreb, which forms a separate NUTS region.

== Cuisine ==
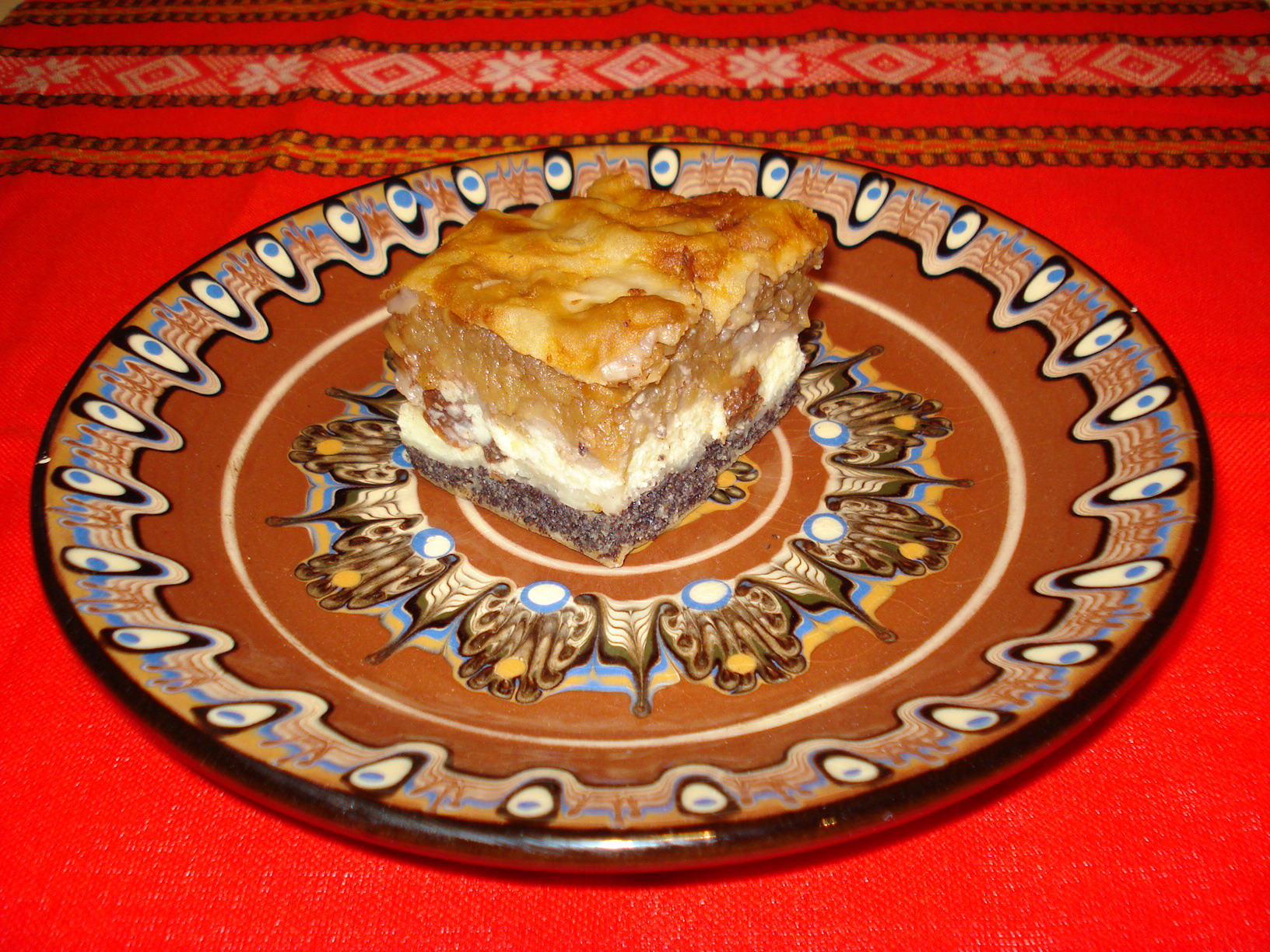
Međimurska gibanica

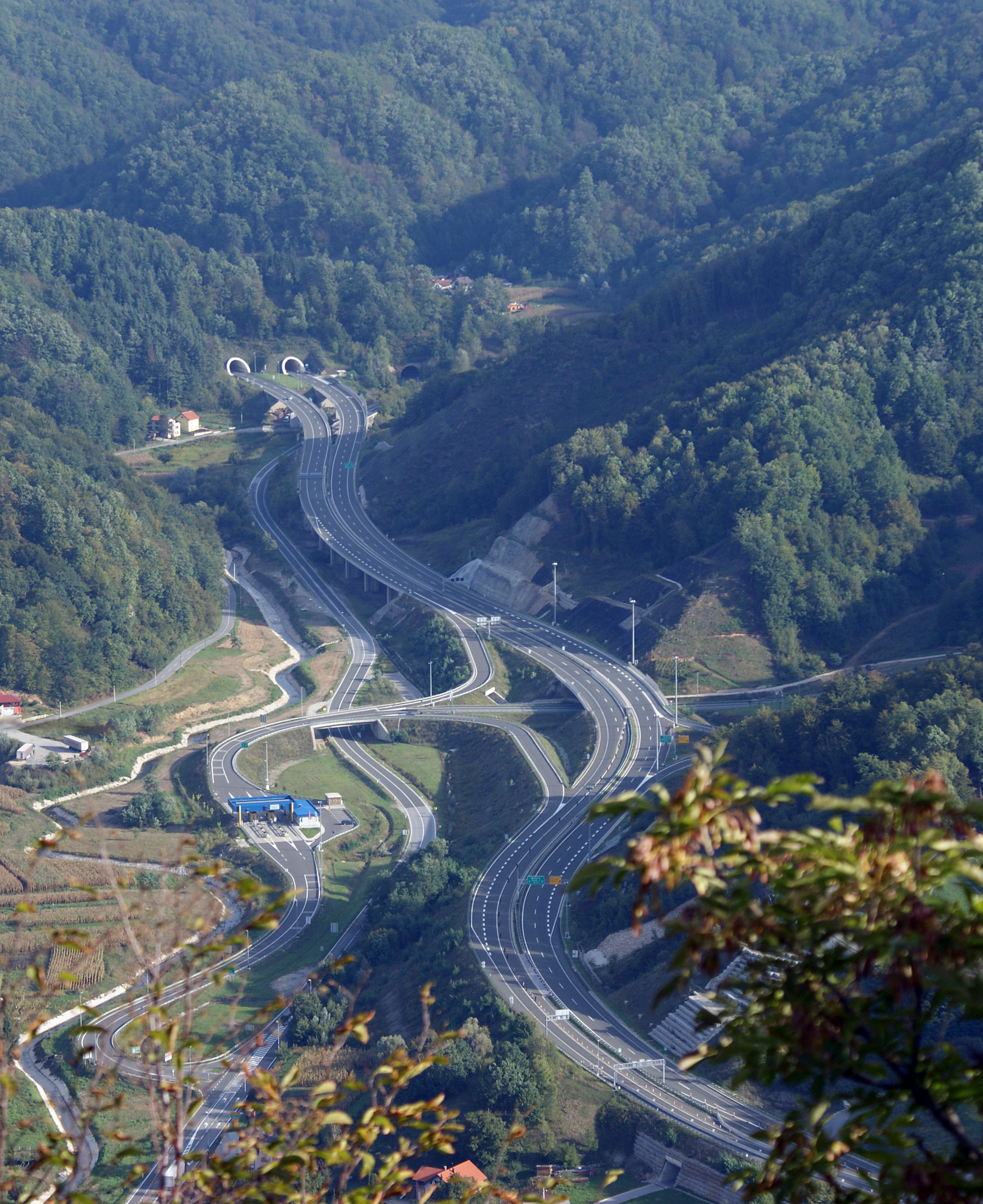
Highway corridor at Đurmanec in Krapina-Zagorje County

The cuisine of Northern Croatia includes dishes of a few local or regional cuisines (Zagorje, Međimurje, Podravina) which have their specific cooking traditions, characteristic for the area and not necessarily well known in other parts of Croatia, as well as dishes that can be found all across the country. The Međimurska gibanica is one of the layer cakes popular in Northern Croatia, especially in the Međimurje region.

== Industry ==
=== Modern infrastructure ===
The Northern Croatia region is at the borders with Hungary and Slovenia. The north–south highway corridor provides access to the Adriatic, which is a geographic advantage to the other countries in Southern Europe. All of North Croatia is connected to the rest of Croatia by highways. 95% of the houses in the region have sufficient ADSL internet access, and some businesses have used fibre optics to do their business.

The region has a very well maintained gas network. Northern Croatia is well connected by railway. The first railway in Croatia was built in Međimurje in 1860, then ruled by Hungary. Some of the major lines in Northern Croatia include:

- M101 (Dobova (SI) - Savski Marof - Zagreb G.K.)
- M102 (Zagreb G.K. - Dugo Selo)
- M201 (Gyekenes (HU) - Koprivnica - Dugo Selo)
- R201 (Zaprešić - Zabok - Varaždin - Čakovec)
- R202 (Varaždin - Koprivnica), extends further towards Eastern Croatia (Virovitica - Osijek - Dalj)
- R106 (Zabok - Krapina – Đurmanec - Rogatec (SI))
- L101 (Čakovec - Mursko Središće - Lendava (SI))
- L102 (Savski Marof - Kumrovec - Imeno (SI))
- L201 (Varaždin - Ivanec - Golubovec)
- L202 (Hum-Lug - Gornja Stubica)

Railway system is of high importance in this region, particularly because it connects the region with the regional and national capital, Zagreb. This is often consisted in traditional music from the region, primarily in Kajkavian:

- Lepe ti je Zagorje zelene / Zagreb Moj - "Beži Jankec, cug ti bu pobegel, ne buš videl beli Zagreb grad." ("Run Jankec, the train will leave you behind, you won't see white (clean) Zagreb city.")
- Zagorski cug - "...i dobri i stari naš cug, fućkal si navek, gda treba i ne." ("... and the good and old train of ours, you always honked when it was needed and not.")
- V Kotoribi cug mašina fućnula. ("In Kotoriba, the train honked.")
- Čim ja dojdem v Međimurje - "Čim ja dojdem v Međimurje, stanem z cug mašine. Z mega serca vel'ka žalost mine." ("When I arrive to Međimurje, step down from the train, the sadness in my heart vanishes.")
- Jedina Međimurska - "Letiš kak cug, spram Kotoribe." ("You fly (move fast) like a train, towards Kotoriba.")

Drama series Gruntovčani, shot in Sigetec, Varaždin county has a plot revolved around the railway system in the region in some episodes, primarily in the episode 9, "Na probi" (On trial) and episode 10 "Ostajte ovdje" (Don't leave the home). Both of these episodes are supposedly shot in non-existent "Srednjaci" village railway station, while in reality, it is the city of Ludbreg railway station, a city between two major regional capitals - Varaždin and Koprivnica.

=== Technology ===
The innovative sector of Northern Croatia has experienced growth in the past years. In 2005, Microsoft established a worker training center in Varaždin. Following this, many other companies have established universities in the fields of Information technology, Automation, and Electronics. The continued investment in universities in the region will meet the demands of the consumers that live there and will continue growth in the region. The availability of first-class human resources in a university in Varaždin has led to advances in software and game development.

== Education ==
=== Public universities ===
Two national public universities are operating in the region.

- University of Zagreb (Zagreb)
- University North (Varaždin & Koprivnica)

=== Private universities ===
- Libertas University (Zagreb)
- University VERN' (Zagreb)
- Croatian Catholic University (Zagreb)

=== Public & private polytechnics ===
- Zagreb University of Applied Sciences (Zagreb)
- Međimurje University of Applied Sciences Čakovec (Čakovec)
- University of Applied Sciences "Hrvatsko zagorje" Krapina (Krapina)
- University of Applied Sciences "Baltazar" Zaprešić (Zaprešić)
- Zagreb School of Economics and Management (Zagreb)
- University of Applied Sciences Križevci (Križevci)
- Zagreb School of Business (Zagreb)
- Edward Bernays University of Applied Sciences (Zagreb)
- University of Applied Sciences Ivanić-Grad (Ivanić-Grad)
- University of Applied Criminology and Public Security Sciences (Zagreb)
- University of Applied Sciences Velika Gorica (Velika Gorica)
- University of Applied Health Sciences (Zagreb)
