= Turopolje pig =

Breed of pig

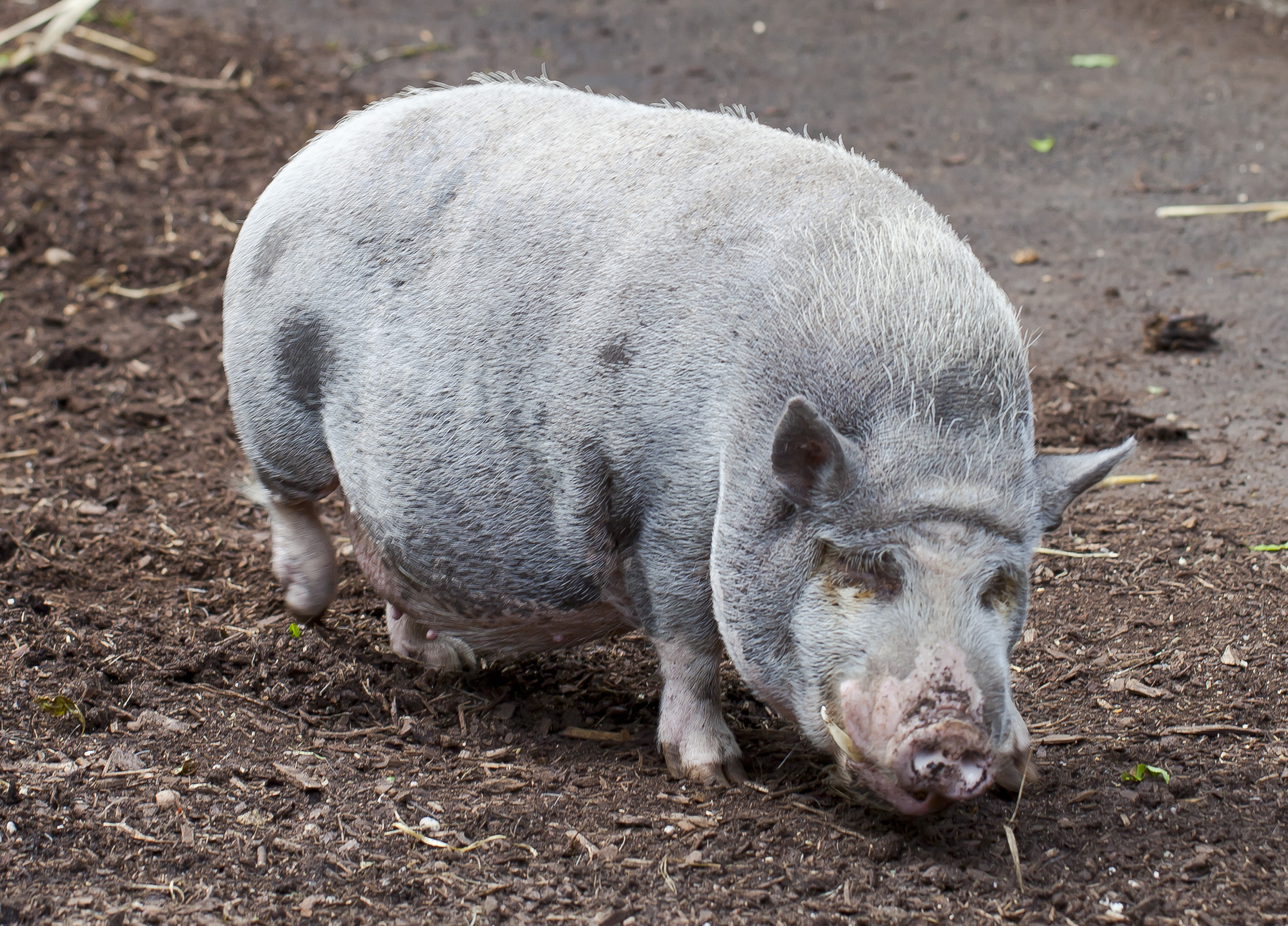
A Turopolje pig

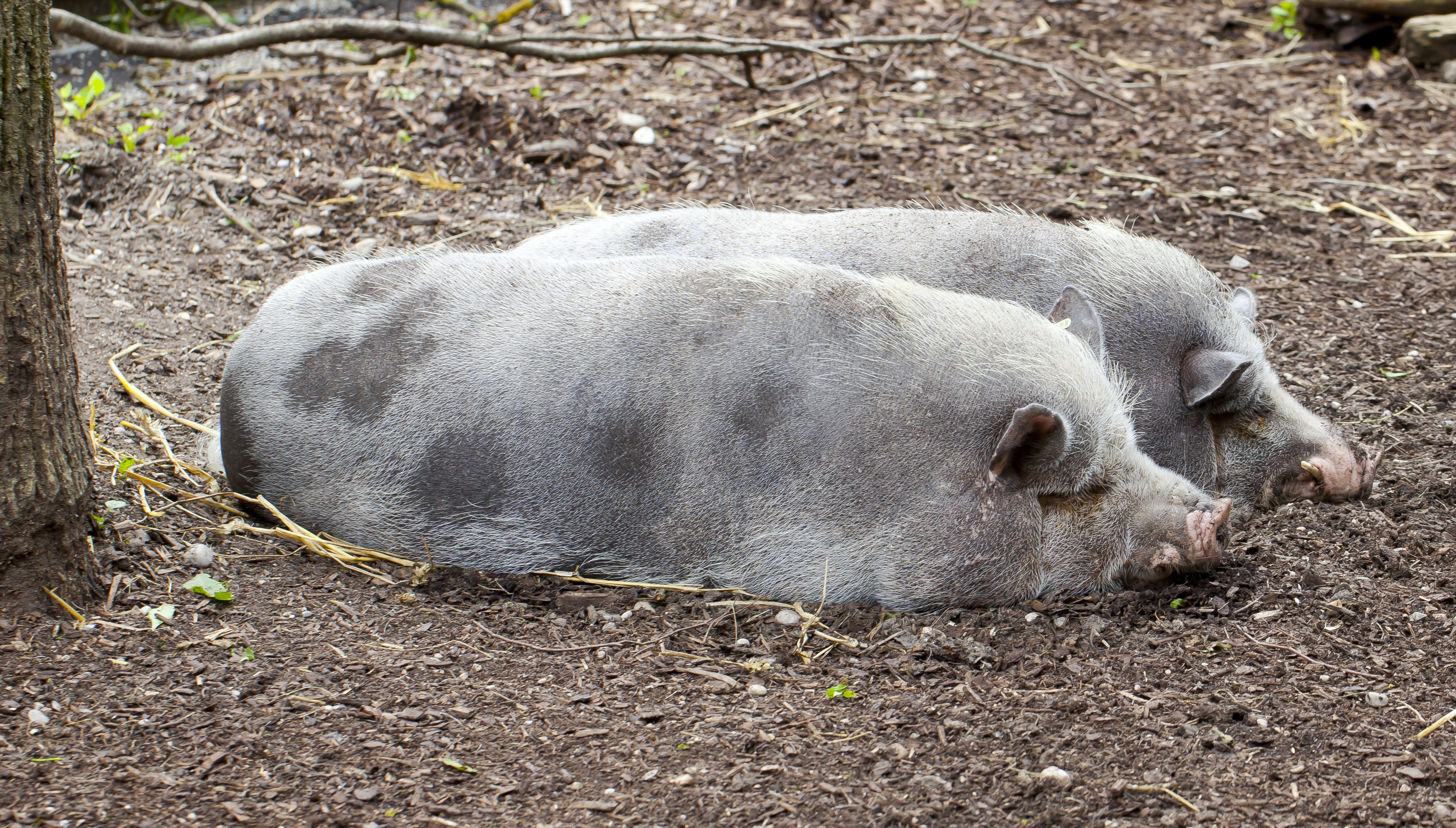
Couple laying

The Turopolje pig (Croatian: Turopoljska svinja) is a breed of domesticated swine named for Turopolje, Croatia, south of Zagreb, where it originates. It is known to be raised in the county of Sisak-Moslavina, as well as the state of Burgenland, Austria. The breed is one of the oldest among European swine, and may have had historical infusions of Berkshire, amongst other bloodlines (possibly in the 19th century). Further cross-breeding throughout history was achieved with Eurasian wild boar specimens, giving the breed its cold-hardiness, adaptability to outdoor life, and overall longevity. The distinctive-looking Turopolje is known for having various black spots (and occasional striping or bi-coloured sections) on a whiteish-grey, sometimes reddish- or tan-coloured skin, sparse hair covering, and often forward-drooping ears. The Turopolje is rather rare; the Yugoslav Wars in the early 1990s brought the pigs nearly to the brink of extinction. Several animals were captured and sent to live in Austria, where they were raised with some challenges in the new environment. Because of these efforts, the breed was able to be saved.

Though it is relatively small, as pig breeds go, and not fast-maturing, the Turopolje is well-known for its hardiness under free range conditions. It is known for having a fat layer measuring up to 15 cm thick, enabling the breed to forage and thrive even during winter snowstorms. It is said that the Turopolje's meat is especially delicious due to the amount of acorns the pigs consume, which fall to the ground from the many Slavonian oaks. Once one of the most widespread swine in its native country, the change from extensive to intensive pig farming in the mid-20th century discouraged its use.
