= List of goat dishes =

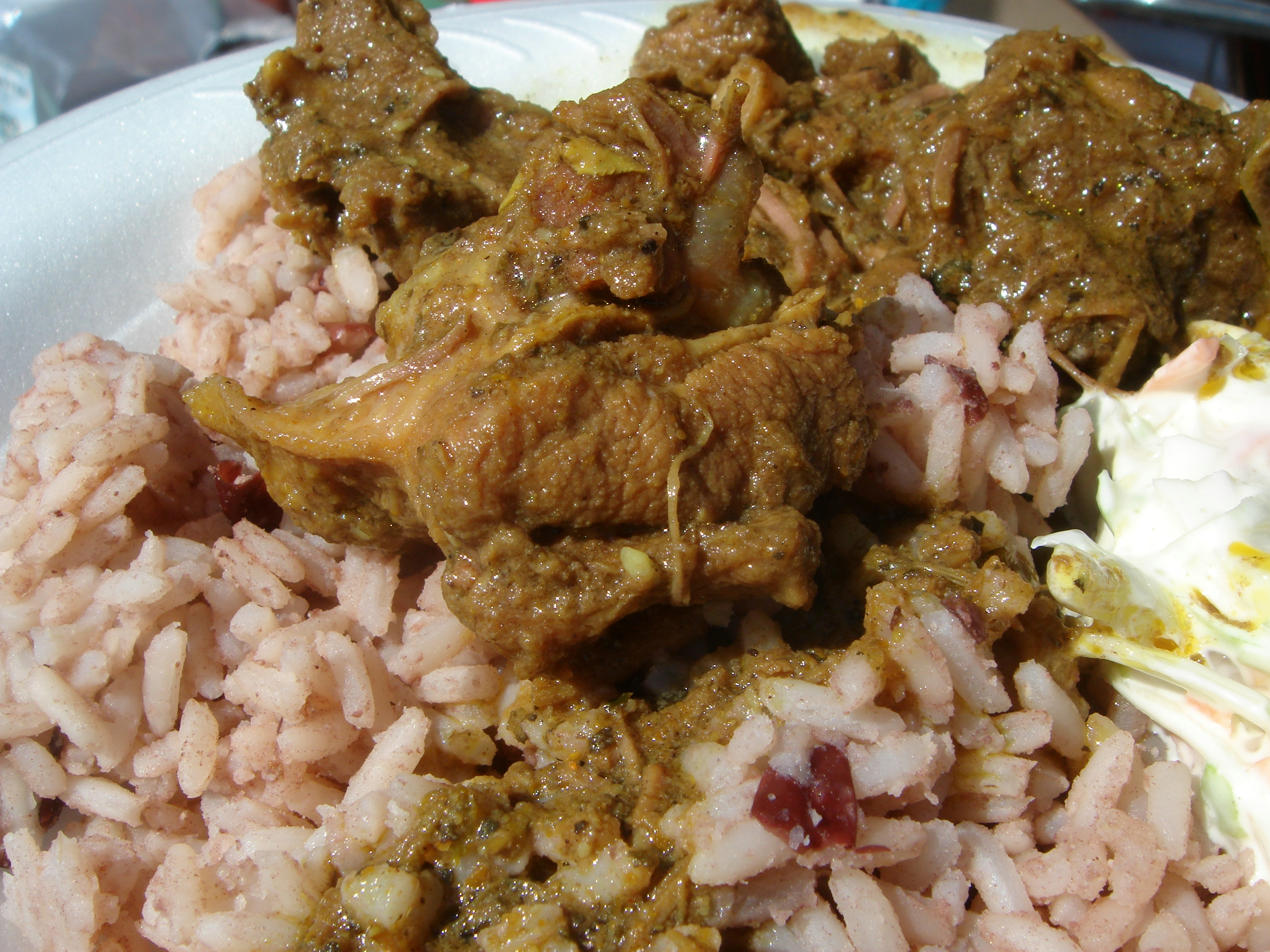
Curry goat and rice

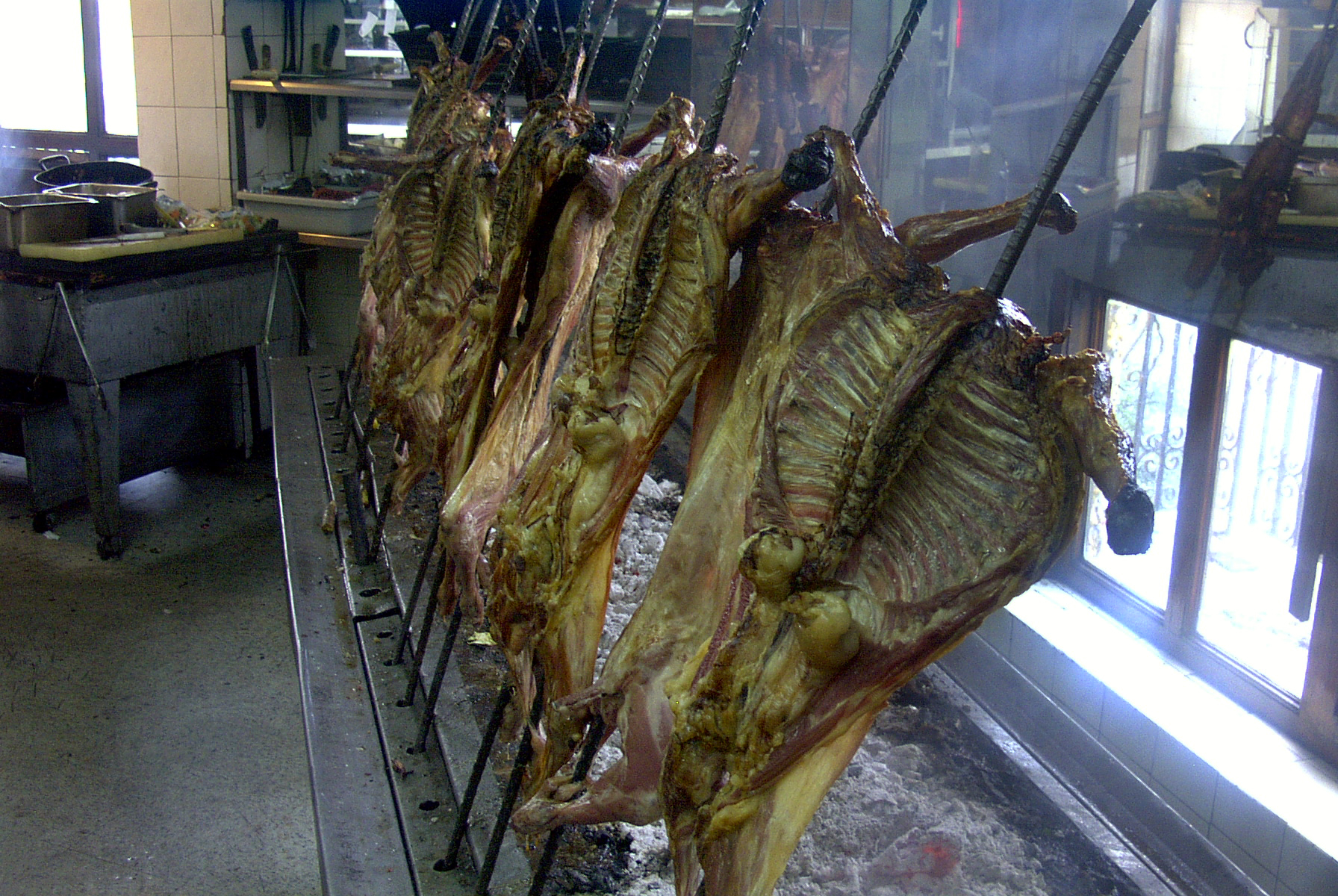
Cabrito

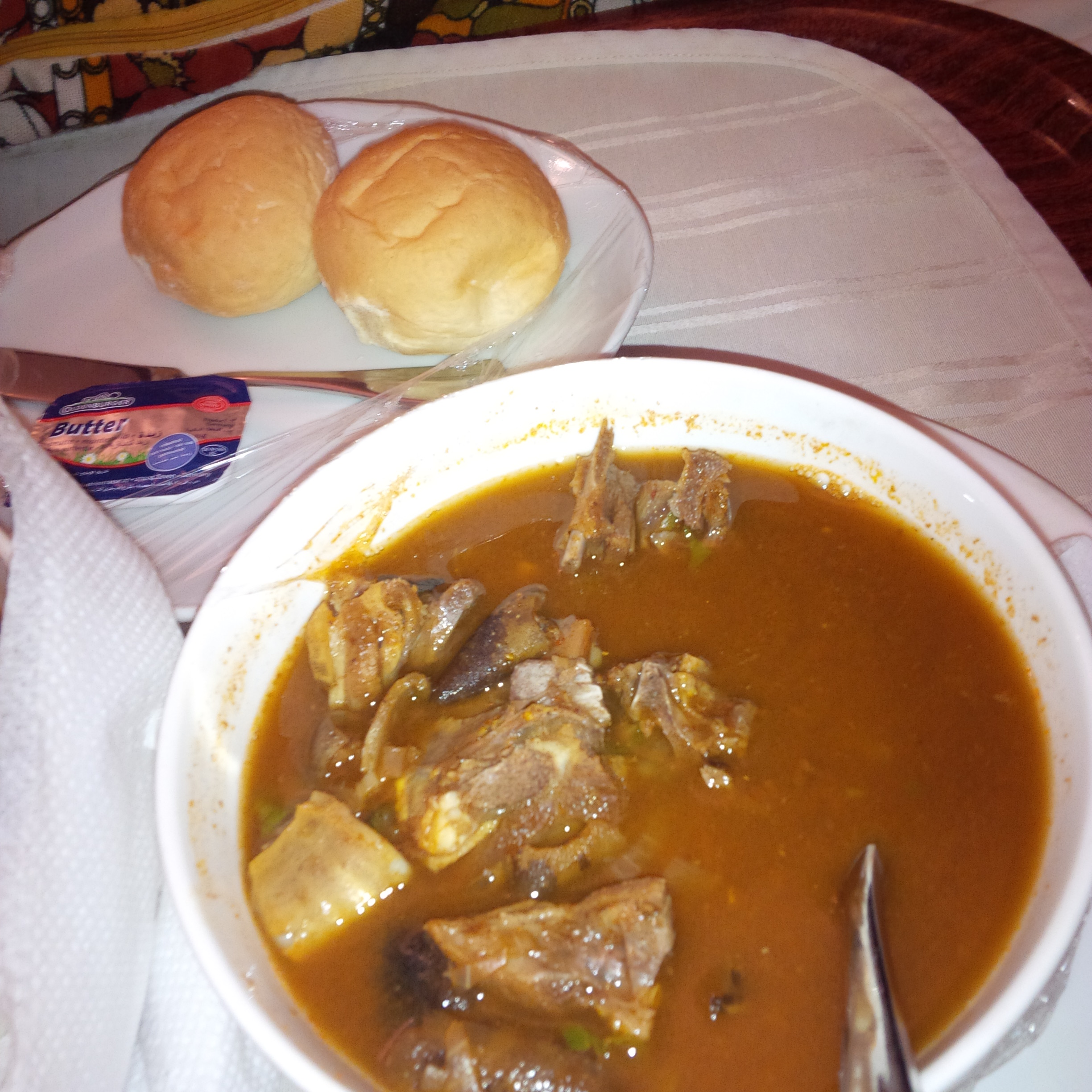
Goat meat pepper soup served with bread

This is a list of notable goat dishes, which use goat meat as a primary ingredient. Goat meat is the meat of the domestic goat (Capra aegagrus hircus). It is often called chevon or mutton when the meat comes from adults, and cabrito, capretto, or kid when from young animals. Worldwide, goat meat is less widely consumed than pork, beef, and poultry.

== Goat dishes ==
=== Curry dishes ===
- Aloo gosht – Curry dish made with meat and potatoes
- Bengali mutton bhuna – Meat curry
- Bhuna – Meat curry gosht
- Goat curry – Spicy stew
- Massaman curry – Mild Thai curry

=== Rice dishes ===
Kabsa can be made with goat meat and wild vegetables such as asparagus. This may be related to the origin of paella.

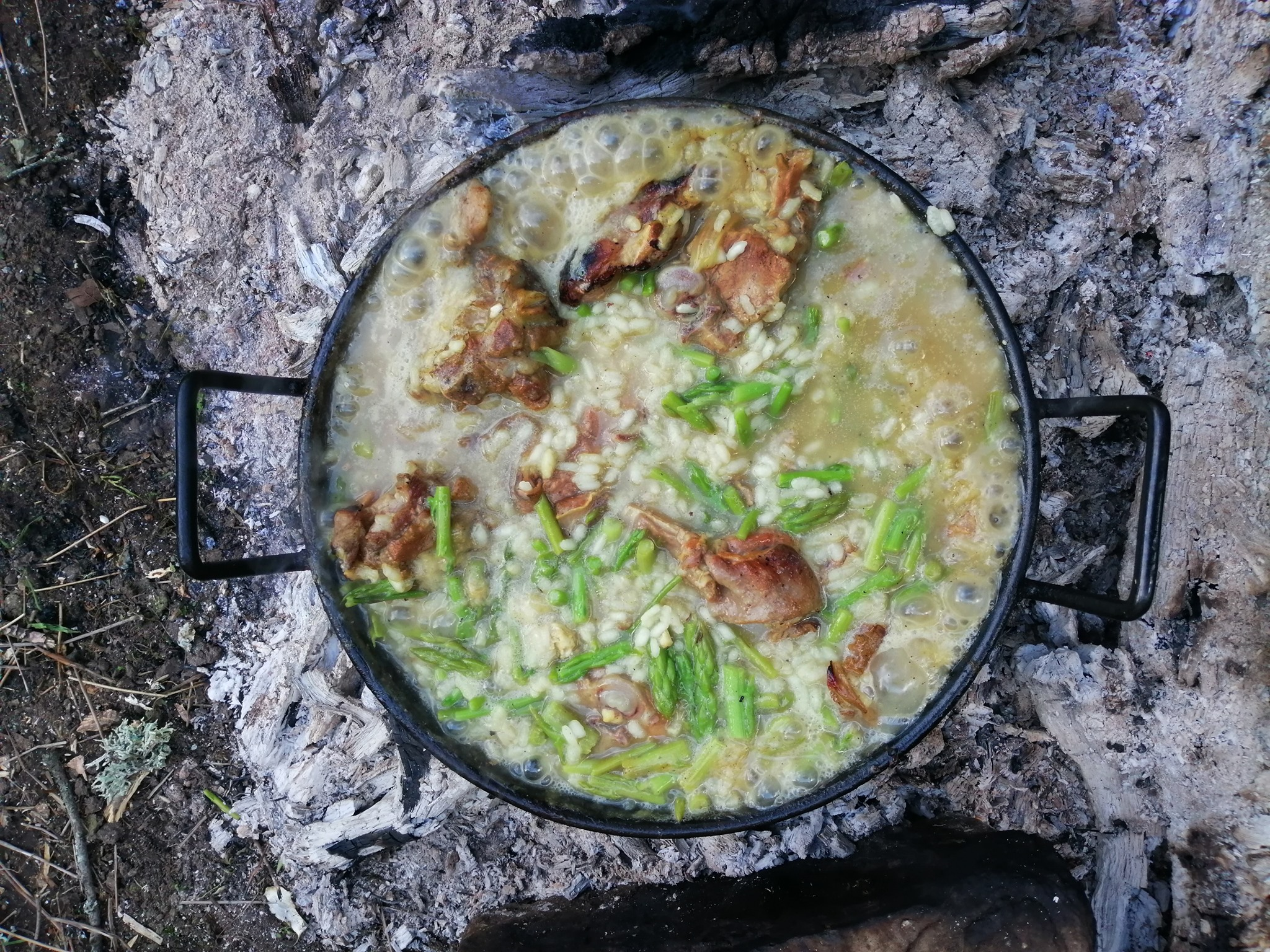
A kabsa dish made with kid meat, wild asparagus and bomba rice

- Biryani – Rice-based dish from South Asia
- Nasi goreng kambing, fried rice served with goat meat in Indonesia and Malaysia

=== Soups and stews ===
- Birria – Mexican meat-based stew
- Chanfana – Portuguese dish of goat stewed in red wine with garlic, laurel and fat
- Chui jhal – A stew from Khulna, Bangladesh
- Haleem – Type of stew
- Patatato - Greek Goat and potato stew made with tomatoes, wine and spices from Amorgos.

=== Miscellaneous ===
- Apohtin
- Argentine mutton barbecue
- Bhutan – A spicy dish prepared with goat tripe. A speciality in Nepal.
- Bocksbraten, a specialty in the surroundings of Bamberg in Germany, which is usually offered for the church consecration (Kirchweih).
- Boodog, a dish from Mongolia where pre-heated stones are put into a goat's carcass
- Cabrito – roast goat kid
- Capra e fagioli – Typical dish of the hinterland of Imperia, Liguria
- Chakna – Indian spicy stew
- Chapli kebab – Pashtun-style minced kebab eaten throughout South Asia
- Nepalese char grilled goat. – Method of cooking meat
- Chivito – Goat dish eaten in Argentina
- Mutton Chow mein – Chinese stir-fried noodles
- Congolese mutton stew – Food and drink of the Democratic Republic of the Congo
- Dhansak – Parsi curry
- Gosht – Persian meat dish
- Ground Chevon Hamburger – Dish with patty between buns.
- Mediterranean Goat Casserole – Variety of cooking pot and general category of foods cooked inside it.
- Mutton Varutharacha Curry.
- Goat roti
- Mutton Gulai – Southeast Asian dish
- Mutton handi – Cooking vessel from the Indian subcontinent
- Heugyeomso-tang – a Korean black goat stew
- Spanish goat meat hotpot
- Hyderabadi biryani
- Mutton Karahi
- Isi ewu – a traditional Igbo dish that is made with a goat's head.
- Italian capretto
- Kabsa – Arab rice dish
- Kaldereta – Filipino meat stew
- Keema Matar – Minced meat dish from India and Pakistan
- Keema Khichuri – Finely chopped meat
- Pasanda – Spicy yogurt-marinated meat curry
- Punjabi Dhabe da keema – Finely chopped meat
- Khichra – Indian cuisine
- Khorkhog – Mongolian dish
- Indian style mutton kofta – Middle Eastern and South Asian meatballs
- Kokoretsi – Grilled lamb or goat intestine dish
- Mutton korma – Type of curry
- Mannish water – Goat soup in Jamaican cuisine
- Maraq – Type of food
- Marathi – Cuisine of the Marathi people from Maharashtra, India Tambda Rassa
- Mutton Momo – Dumpling in Tibetan and Nepali cuisine
- Mughlai keema paratha – Popular street food originated in Bengal
- Mutton pulao
- Nasi kebuli – Arab Indonesian rice dish
- Nihari – Meat stew originating in the Indian subcontinent
- Bhuteko Masu (Nepalese Pan fried mutton)
- Mutton paya
- Roganjosh
- Sate kambing – made by grilling goat meat that has been mixed with seasoning
- Sate klatak
- Seco (food)
- Shami kebab with goat
- Mutton Vathal (South Indian cuisine)
- Sup kambing – Indonesian mutton soup dish
- Swan Puka
- Nepalese Taas – Metropolitan City in Bagmati Province, Nepal
- Tajine – Maghrebi dish prepared in the earthenware pot of the same name
- Indian goat Tandoori
- Raagi Balls – Karnataka, India Geographical Indicator
- Thukpa
- Tongseng
- Tsamarella
- Goat Vindaloo
- Australian goat Meat pie (Australia and New Zealand)
- Galaoti Kabab – an Indian kebab made from goat fat and meat of goat kid.
Goat dishes

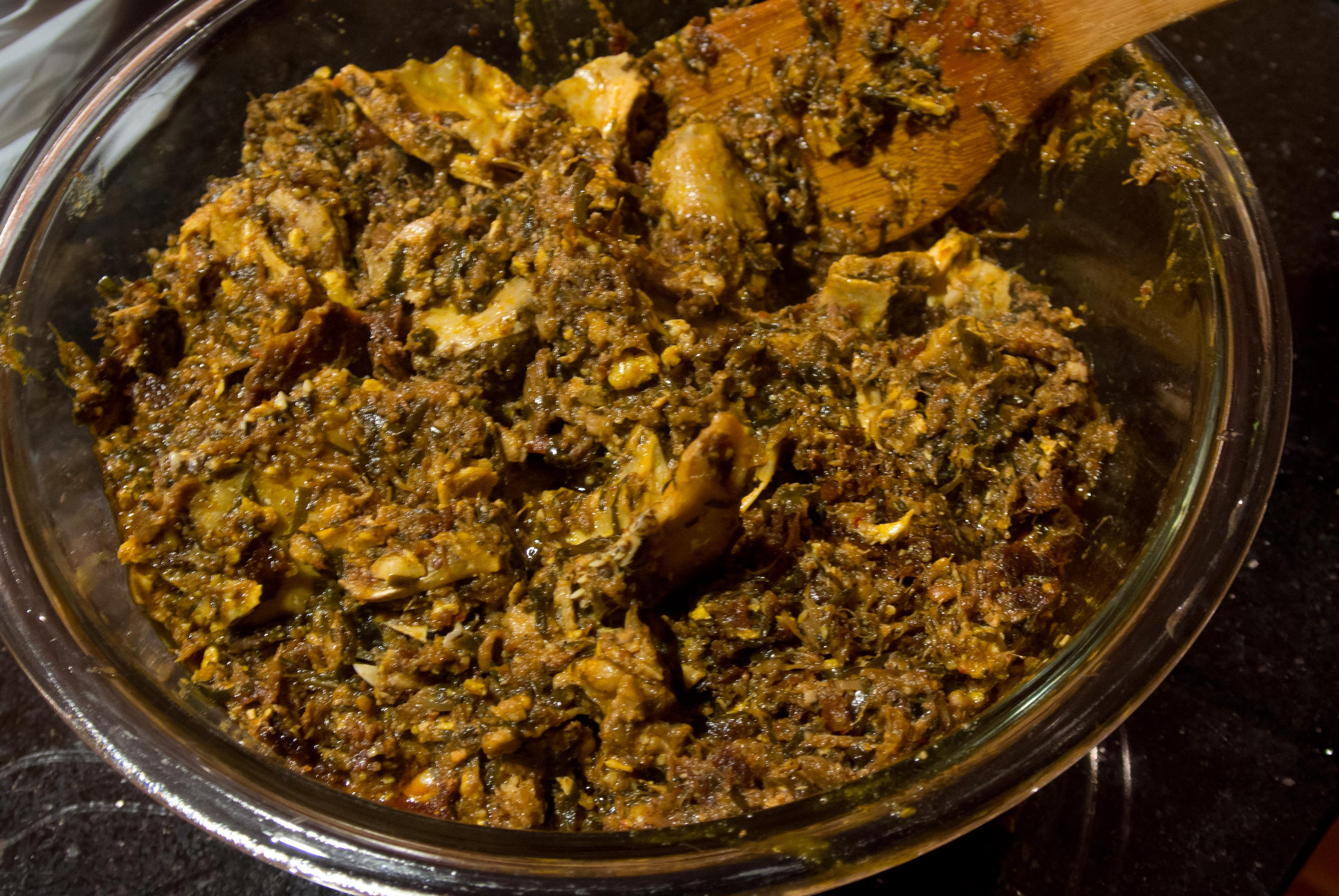
Isi ewu

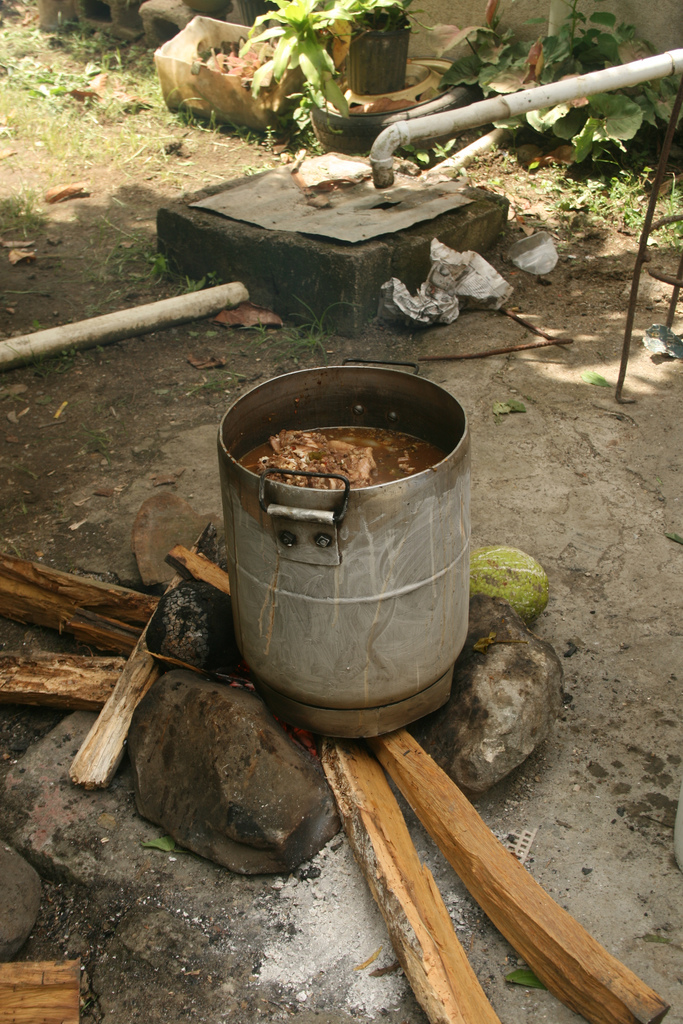
Mannish water

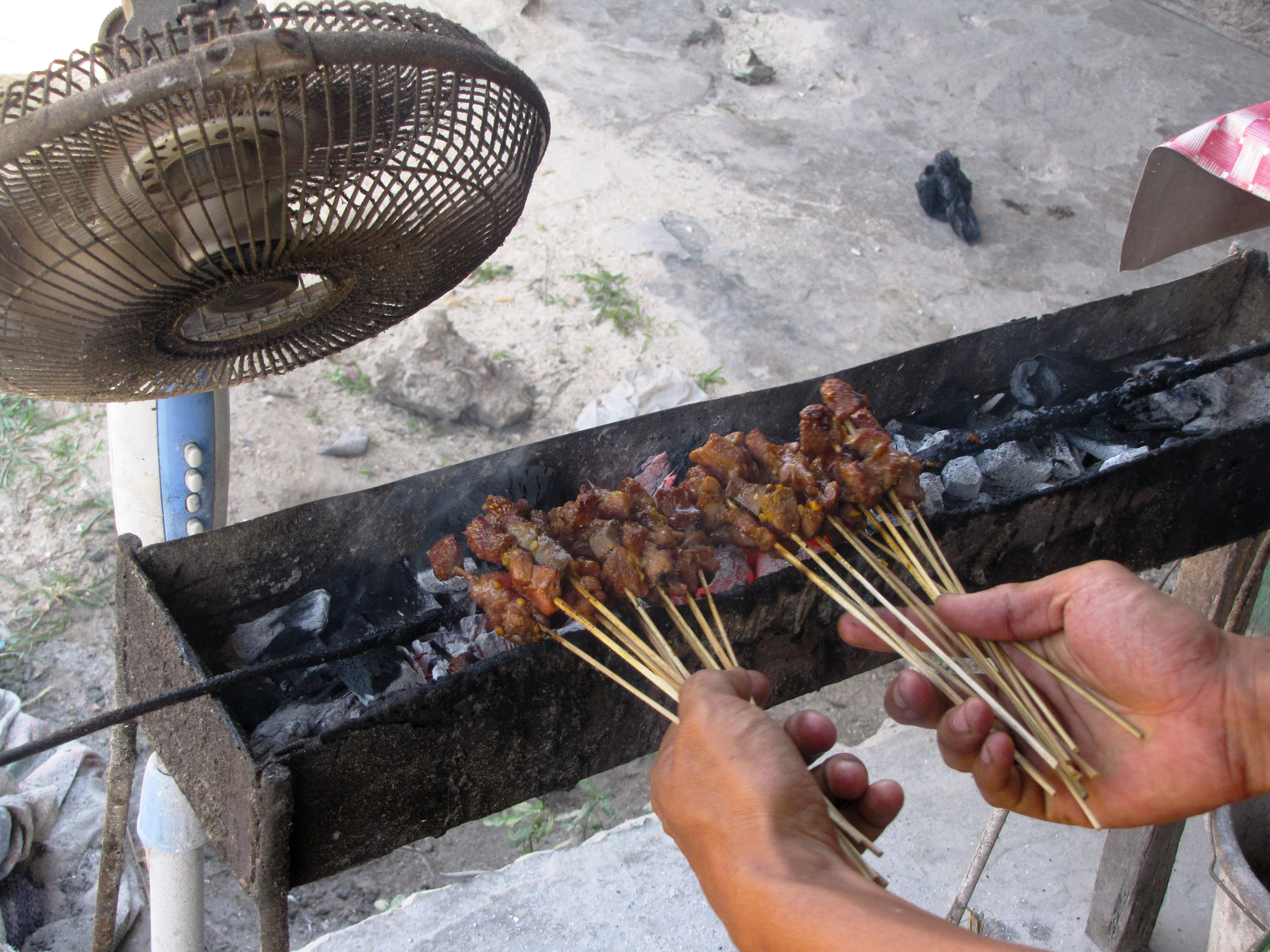
Sate kambing prepared using goat meat

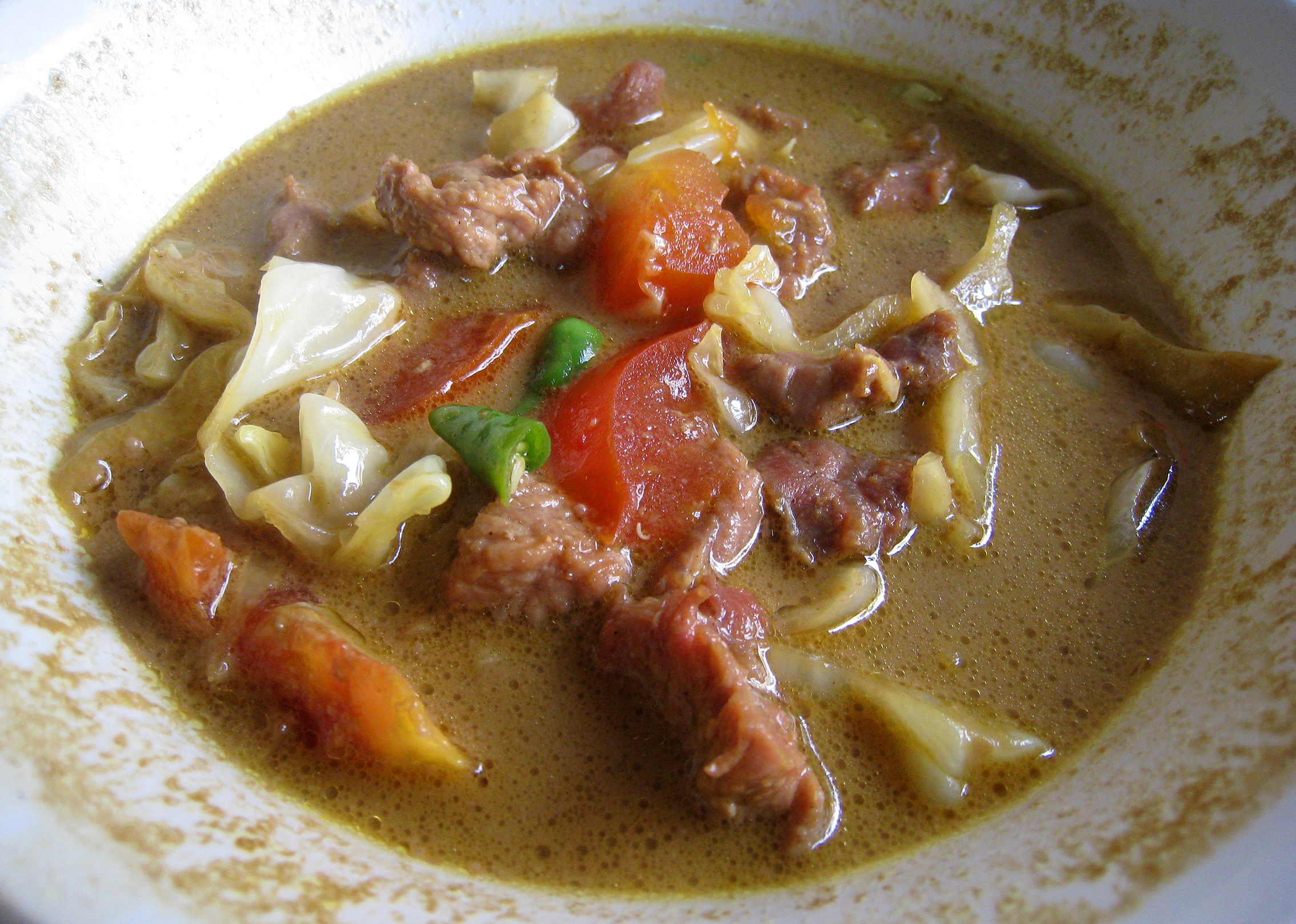
Tongseng prepared with goat meat

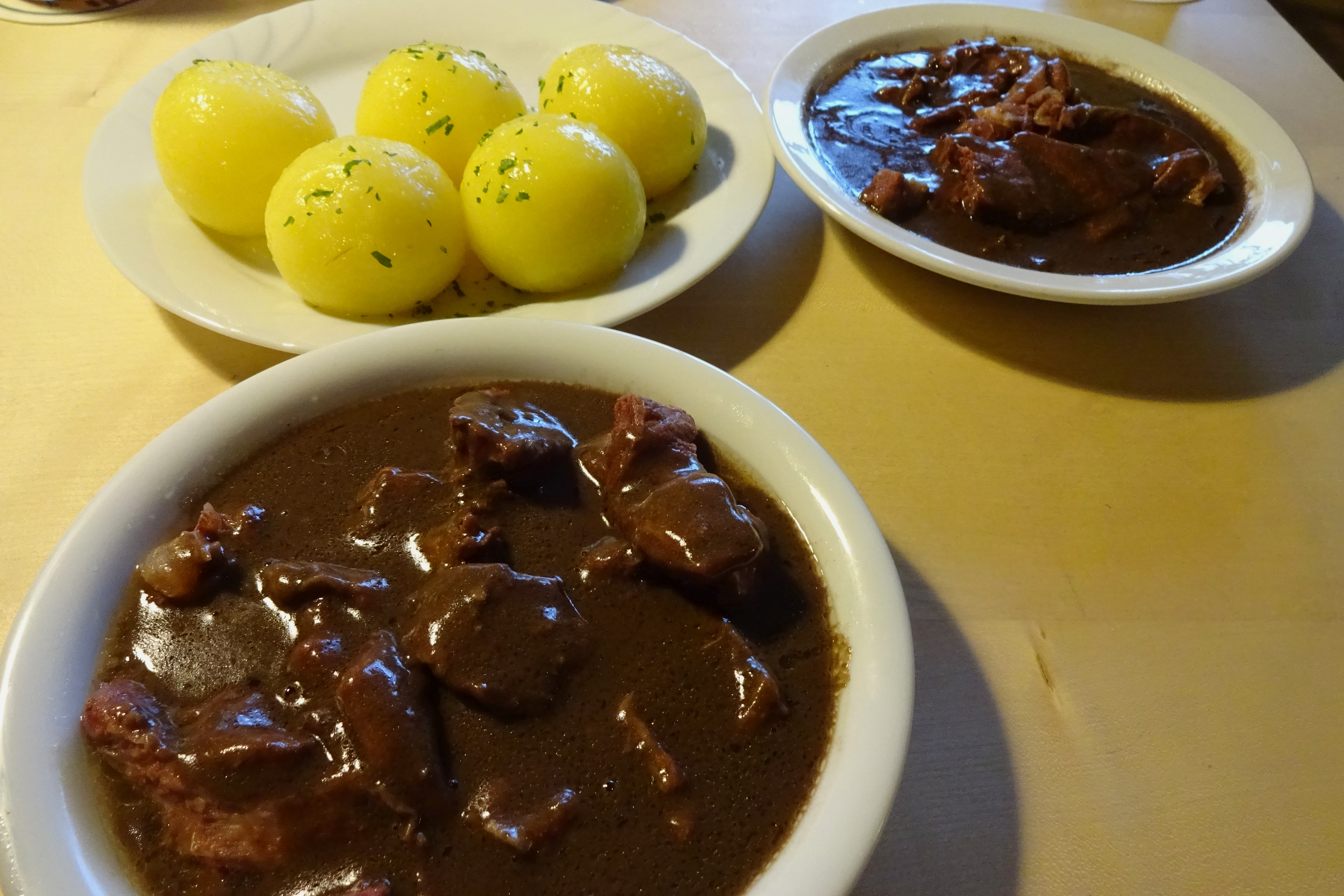
Bocksbraten with potato dumplings

== See also ==
- Goat cheese
- List of goat milk cheeses
- Goat milk
- Lists of prepared foods
