= Abacha (food) =

Nigerian food

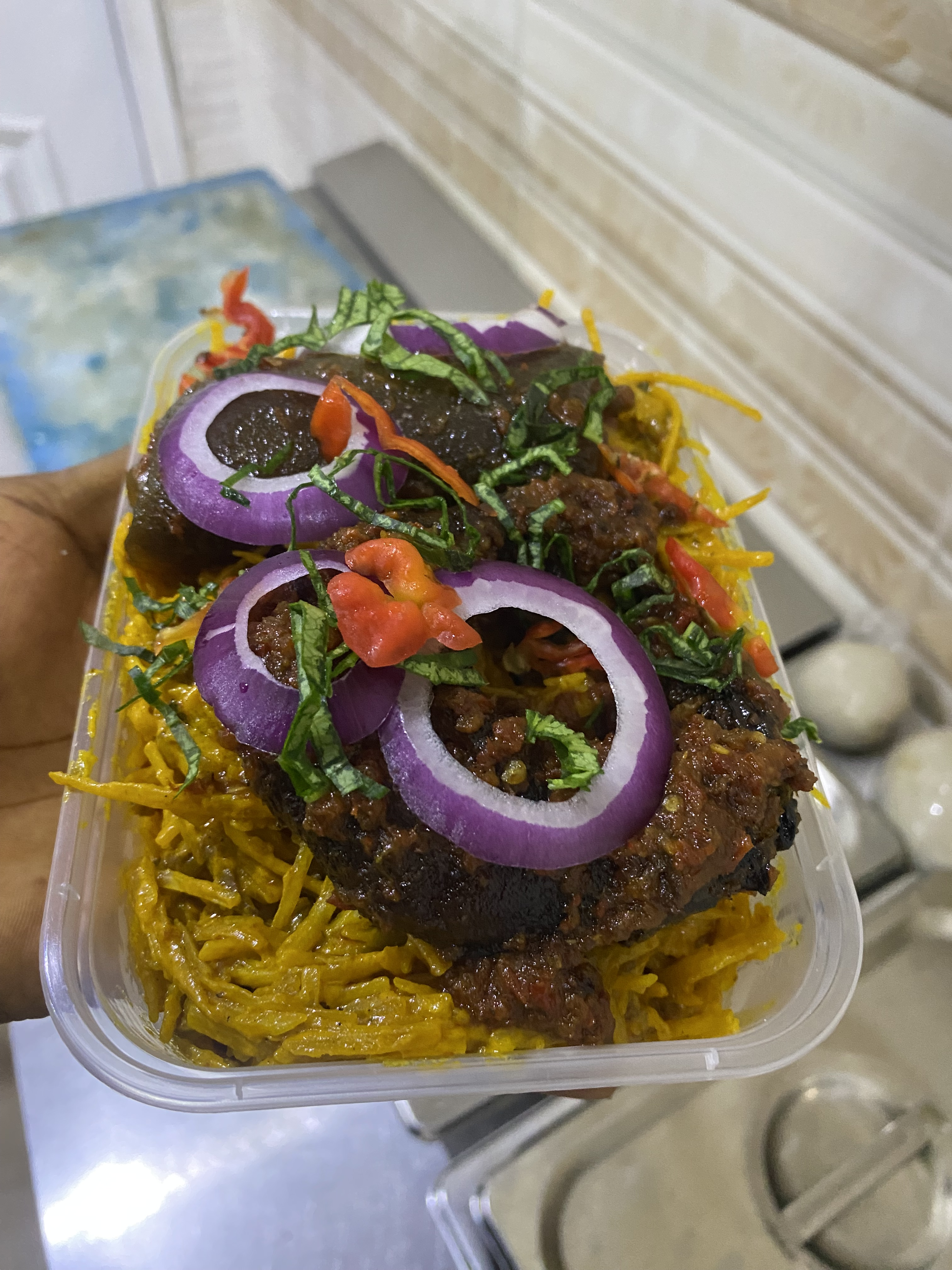
- Abacha with kanda, fish, onions, and utazi
- Alternative names: African salad
- Place of origin: Nigeria
- Region or state: South East
- Serving temperature: Cold
- Main ingredients: Dried shredded cassava
- Food energy (per 100 g serving): 367 kcal (1,540 kJ)
Nutritional value
(per 100 g serving)
- Protein: 2g g
- Fat: g
- Carbohydrate: g

Abacha is a type of food originating with the Igbos of Nigeria. Abacha is a product of cassava tubers. When the processing of it is done from scratch, harvested cassava is obtained, peeled, washed, cooked and sliced into desired sizes or shapes. It is soaked for a day. It could be prepared instantly as abacha or sun-dried for future use. Shredded dried cassava first needs to be softened by soaking in boiled water and covered up for a few minutes. Abacha is quite different from mpataka. Mpataka is a cassava snack made by boiling the cassava, cutting it into smaller pieces and soaking it in running water for 12–36 hours. It is eaten with akị bekee (coconut, Cocos nucifera), ube (African pear, Dacryodes edulis) and ube ọkpoko (Canarium schweinfurthii). In some places across Igboland, mpataka is also called abacha mmiri, eberebe or jigbo, iboh or iwakpu.

Optional supplementary ingredients, which often represent regionally-derived variations, include ogiri; ugba (also called ukpaka); oporo (large dried shrimp); fried fish; dry fish; coloured peppers; seasoning cubes; ehuru (or "ehulu"; colloquially shortened to ehu); pepper (such as Scotch bonnet); onions; utazi; garden eggs (and sometimes the leaves); ukazi leaves; akidi beans (marked variant); akpukpo anu (kanda; cow-skin); and ukwa (possibly unique to the Ikwerre people). Palm oil, which may either be red or a combination of red and bleached, is curdled using either kaun (potash), ngu (a traditional version of potash) or baking soda, and the abacha slices are then mixed in the curdled oil.

Adding condiments or additional ingredients allows abacha to be prepared for a range of appetites, depending on whether diners want a light, cold snack or something closer to a stand-alone meal. Abacha is also known as African salad.

== Gallery ==
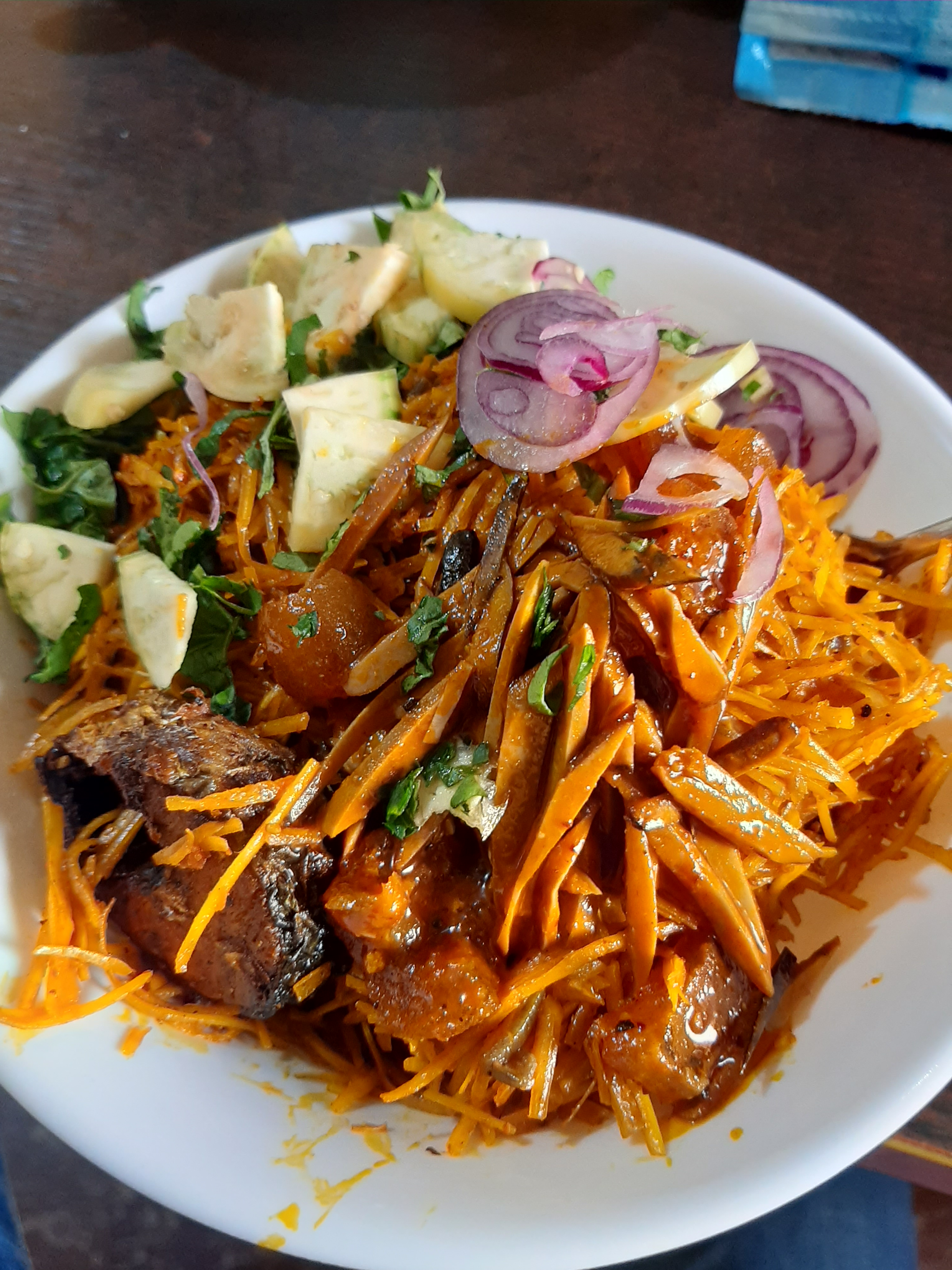
Abacha with onions

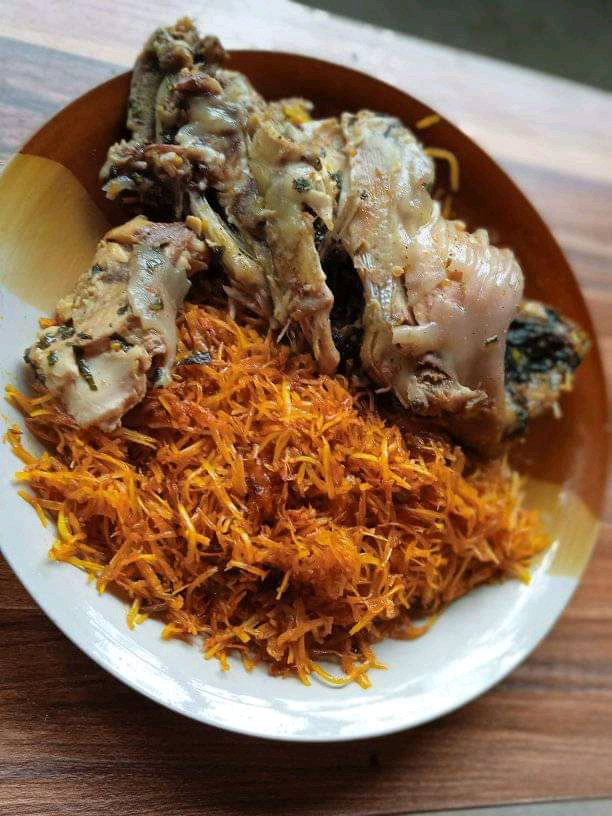
Abacha with protein

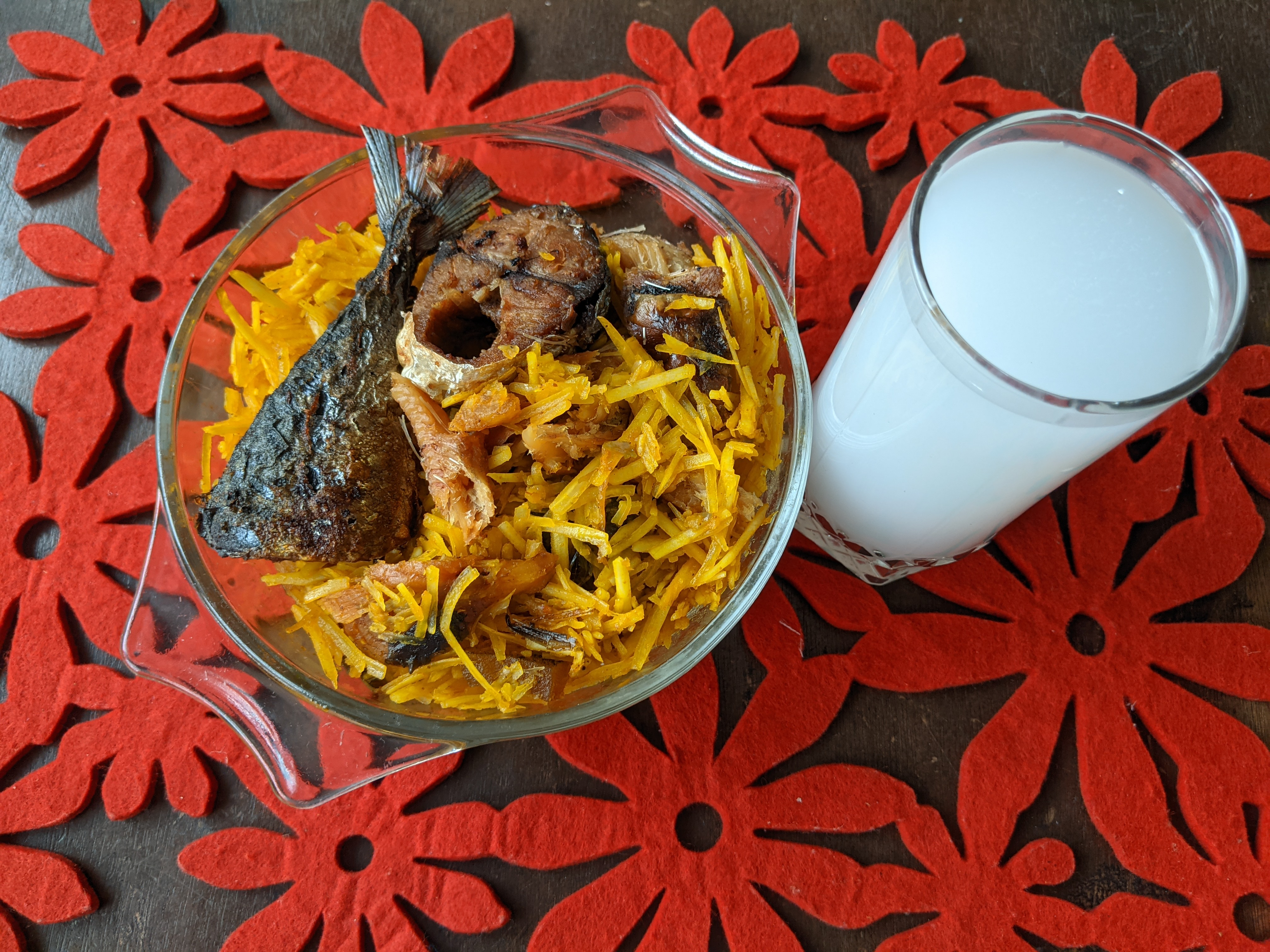
Abacha with fried fish and a glass of palm wine

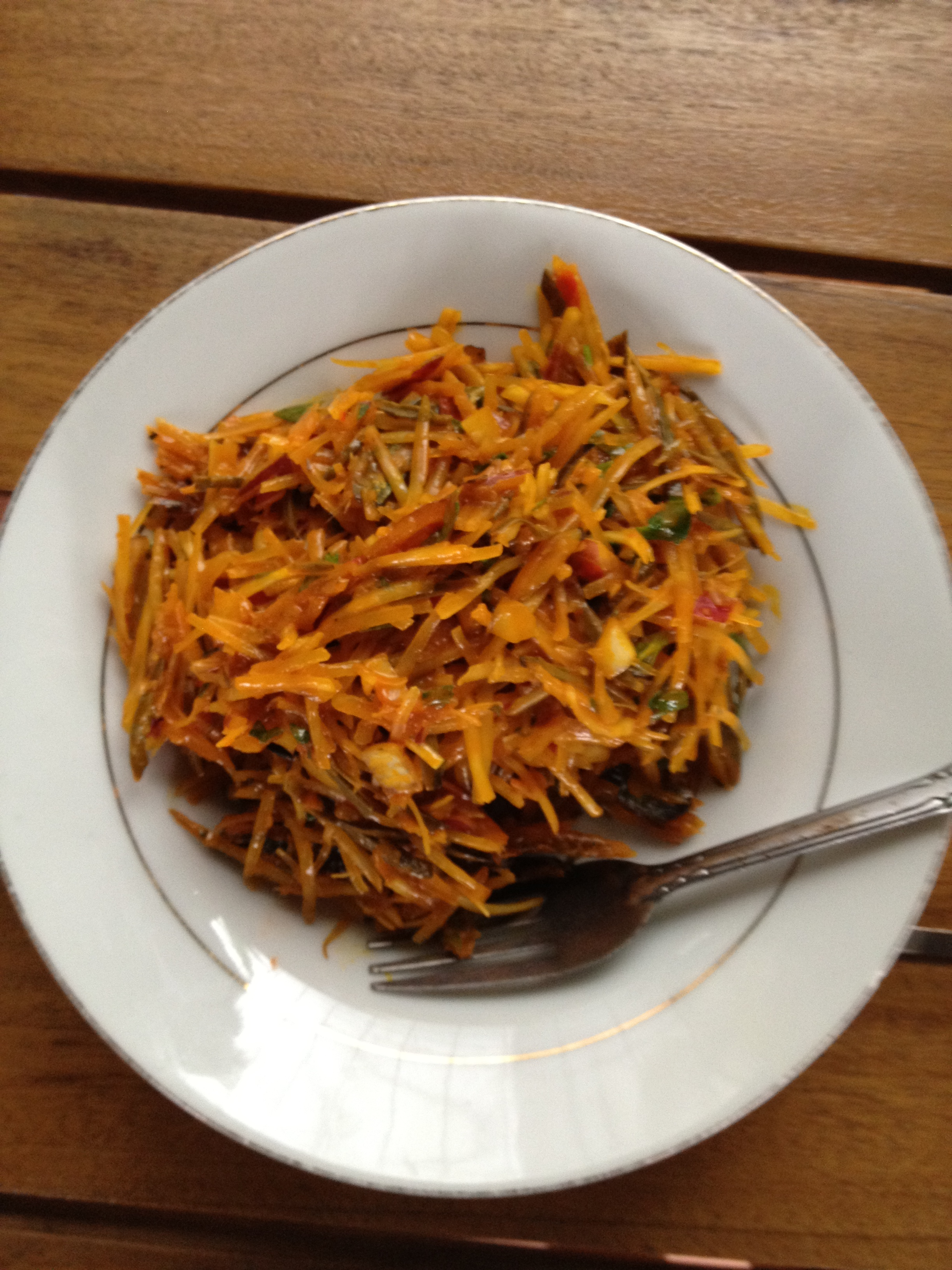
Plain abacha
Abacha with fish

== Nutrition ==
Cassava is the main ingredient in abacha, and a single tuber contains about 80% carbohydrate. There are 373 calories in one average serving of abacha.

== Health benefits ==
Abacha is made from processed and shredded cassava. It contains high levels of potassium, which is beneficial for heart health and helps the body fight diseases. Due to added ingredients such as crayfish, meat, chili pepper, and garden eggs, Abacha is supplemented with protein and crude fiber. A complete Abacha meal contains minerals such as sodium, calcium, potassium, magnesium, iron, and zinc.

== See also ==
- Nkwobi
- Garri
- Ofe Oha
