= Kambing =

Kambing means "goat" in Malay, Filipino and Indonesian languages.

In cuisine, it may refer to:

- Sate kambing
- Sup Kambing

Geographically, it may refer to:

- Atauro Island or kambing island in East Timor.
- Kambing Island (East Java)
- Kambing Island (South Sulawesi)
- Kambing Island (Terengganu)
