= Isi ewu =

Nigerian soup made from goat's head

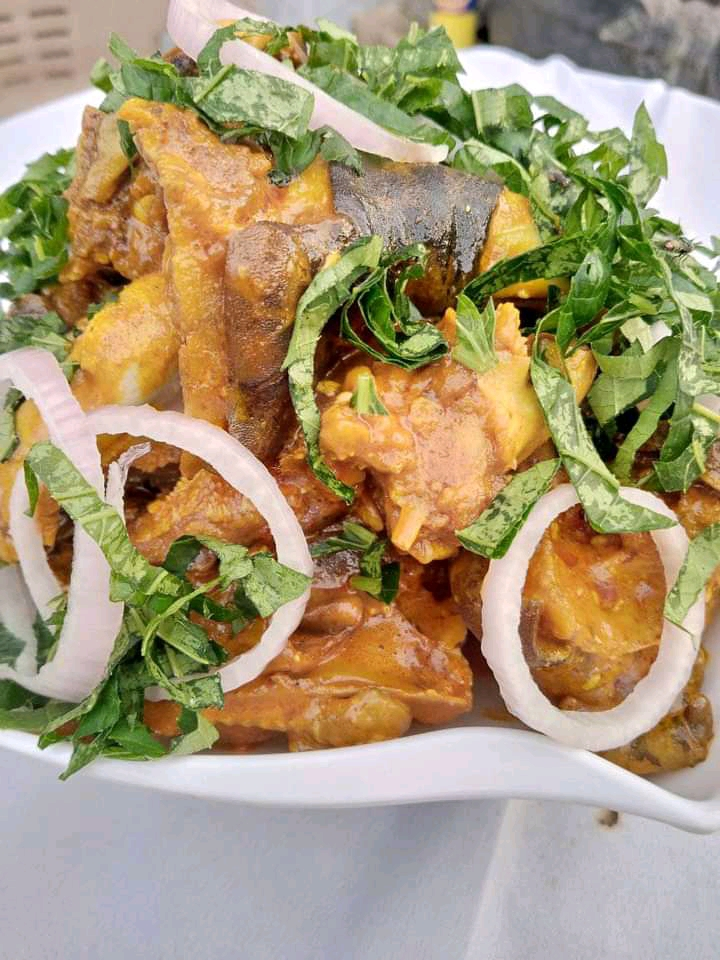
- Alternative names: Goat's head soup, spiced goat's head
- Type: meat
- Place of origin: Nigeria
- Region or state: Igboland
- Main ingredients: Goat's head; Palm Oil; Leafy vegetables
- Ingredients generally used: Crayfish; Onions

Isi ewu (English: Goat's head) // is a traditional Igbo dish that is made with a goat's head.

It is a soup similar to spicy cow feet (nkwobi) except that isi ewu is made from the head of a goat rather than cow feet. Some restaurants cook the whole head at once, others reduce the amount of water used and cut the head into pieces.

== Ingredients ==
A goat head, calabash nutmeg (also known as ehu seed), onion, potash, palm oil, utazi leaves, and ụgba are required to cook Isi Ewu soup

== Preparation ==
The meat is boiled until tender inside a pot; a pressure cooker is mostly used due to the toughness of goat meat.

Grated onion, seasoning, pepper and salt are added to thickened palm oil made from adding a mixture of sieved potash and water to palm oil in another pot entirely.

The goat head, brain separate (mashed with mortar), calabash nutmeg, ugba are also added to the thickened palm oil after some minutes.

Isi ewu is served with sliced onions and utazi leaves when done. It can be eaten with rice or any side dish of your choice. Isi Ewu is typically served in a bowl and eaten directly with one’s hands.

== Cultural significance ==
It is mostly prepared for special occasions such as weddings, festivals, and traditional meetings, and is often served with chilled palm wine, beer, or any drink of choice. It is regarded as a symbol of celebration and pride in Igbo culture due to its authenticity.

== See also ==
- Nigerian cuisine
- Igbo cuisine
- List of African dishes
- List of goat dishes
