= Mannish water =

Goat soup in Caribbean cuisine

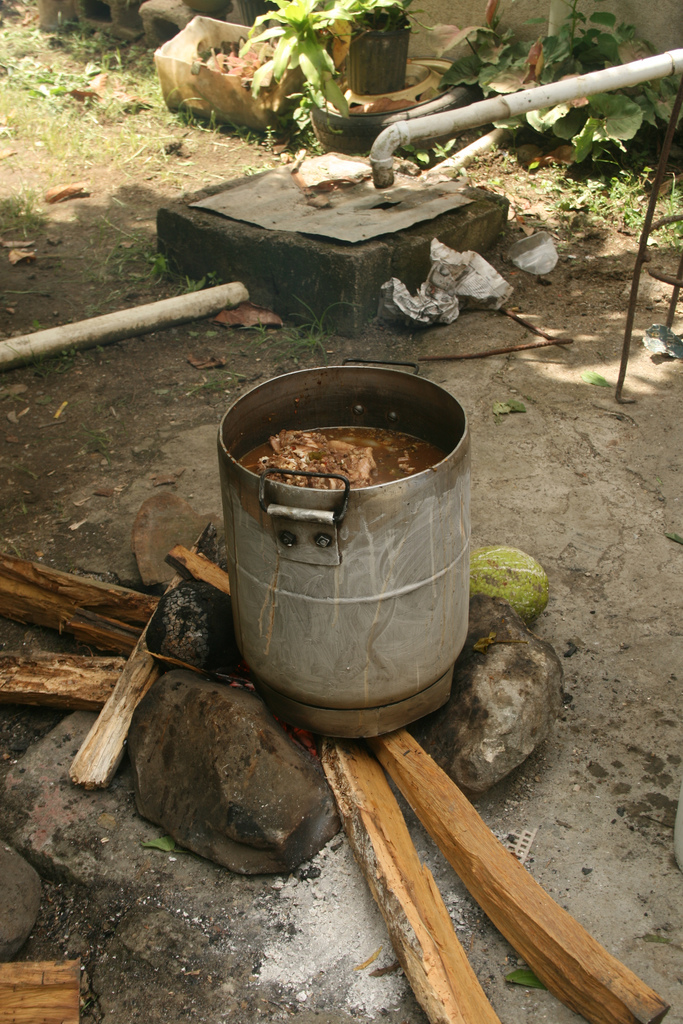
- Type: Soup
- Place of origin: caribbean
- Main ingredients: Goat parts, vegetables, yams, potatoes, bananas, dumplings

Mannish water is a goat soup in the Caribbean cuisine. It is believed to be an aphrodisiac and is made from various goat parts.

The meal has been part of Maroon celebrations for over 300 years. The pieces of goat are seasoned with local herbs and spices, and cooked along with vegetables and "food" - yam, potato, bananas and dumplings. Mannish water is still popular at "dead yard" functions, large stage shows and parties (to make sure one can drive home after a few drinks). The food company's factory is in the hills bordering Manchester and Trelawny parishes.

According to the Rough Guide, mannish water is traditionally served to a groom on his wedding night. It is also discussed as a cultural feature in books about Jamaica.

The soup has been sold packaged since 2006 when it competed for Best New Food Idea in a competition covered by The Jamaica Observer. The Spicy Hill Farms company is behind the product, an offering of "Jamaica's favourite party soup". Feedback indicated it was going to be as popular as Tastee patties.

The dish is mentioned in the 1974 Pluto Shervington song, "Ram Goat Liver", which was reissued in 1976 (following the success of "Dat") and made it to No. 43 in the UK Singles Chart. The chorus contained the lines, "Ram goat liver good fi mek mannish water... curried goat lunch put de bite in your bark".

The dish is believed to have inspired The Rolling Stones with the name for their 1973 Goats Head Soup album. Some of the album was recorded during the early 1970s while the band was relocated in Kingston, Jamaica's Dynamic Sound Studios.

Terrance Hayes' poem "Capra Aegagrus Hircus" refers to the stew.

== See also ==
- Cow cod soup
- List of goat dishes
- List of Jamaican dishes and foods
