= Madurese cuisine =

Cuisine of the Madurese people of Indonesia

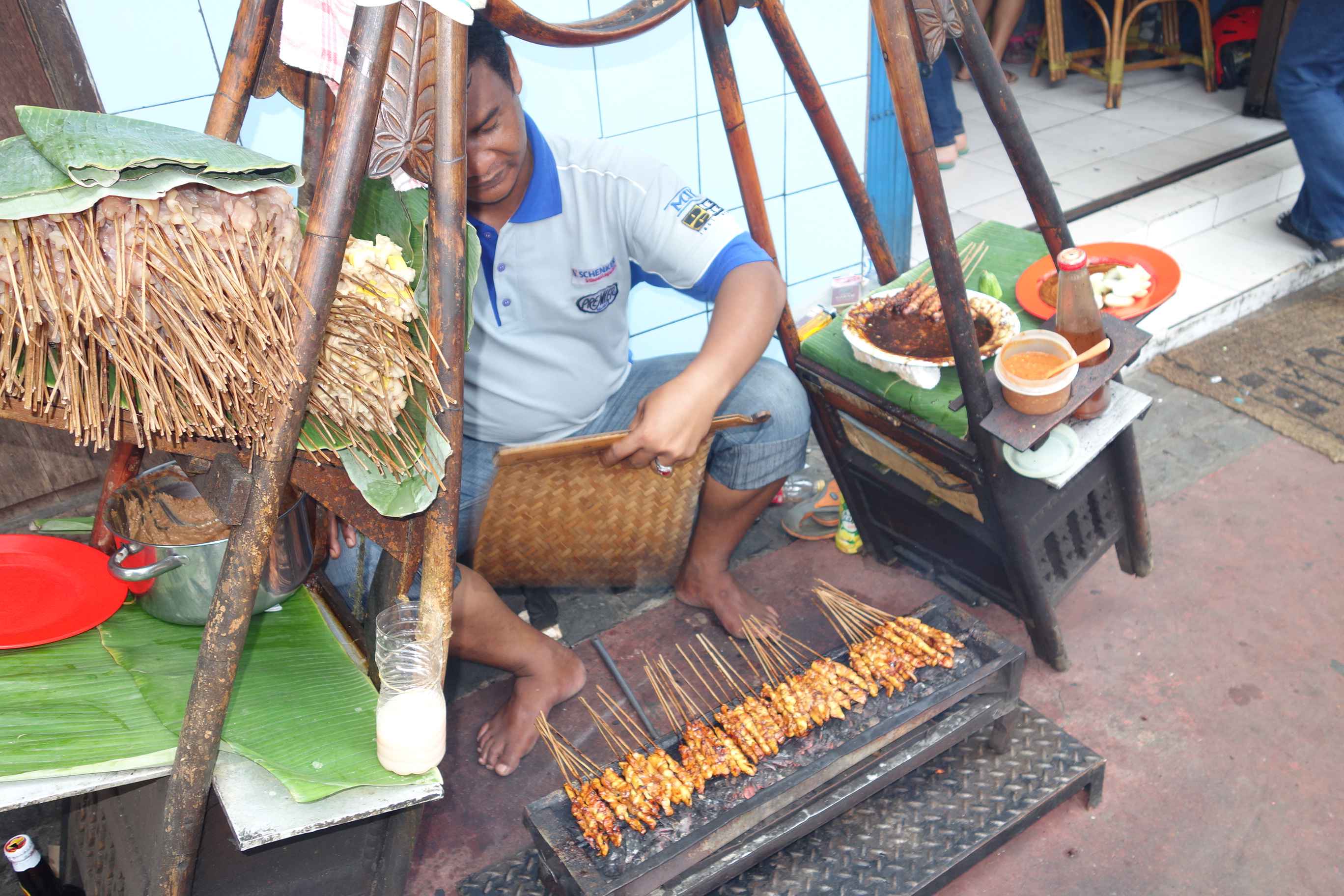
Sate madura being grilled.

Madurese cuisine is the culinary tradition of the Madurese people from Madura Island in Indonesia. This cuisine is particularly well-known in the neighboring areas of East Java, as well as on the south coast of Kalimantan. As a leading salt production center in the Indonesian archipelago, Madurese dishes are often saltier compared to Eastern Javanese cuisine, although with significant Javanese influences.

Madurese dishes add petis ikan which despite the name (ikan=fish) is made using shrimp. The Madurese-style satay is probably the most popular satay variants in Indonesia. Some of its popular dishes include chicken satay, mutton satay, Madurese soto, goat soup and peanut sauce.

== List of Madurese foods ==
=== Dishes ===
- Bebek bumbu hitam, juicy fried duck with a black spice-mixed sauce.
- Bebek guring, traditional seasoned fried duck.
- Bebek Sinjay, juicy fried duck with sambals.
- Campor, broth mixed with peanut sauce.
- Kaldu kokot, green beans cooked with beef broth.
- Nasek bebek, rice dish with duck meat. This dish is similar to duck rice.
- Nasek campur, Madurese-style mixed rice dish with assorted vegetables and meat of choice.
- Nasek cumi hitam, mixed rice dish with a deep fried squid in a ink with a black spice-mixed sauce.
- Nasek jagung, steamed rice mixed with cornmeal.
- Nasek serundeng, rice dish served with serundeng.
- Rojak cengur, mixture of vegetables, tofu, tempeh, lontong, beansprouts with petis black fish paste sauce and slices of boiled cow's lips.
- Sate madura, famous satay variant usually made from mutton or chicken, the recipe's main characteristic is the black sauce made from sweet soy sauce mixed with palm sugar, garlic, deep fried shallots, peanut paste, shrimp paste, candlenut and salt.
  - Sate ayam, satay made of chicken meat.
  - Sate kambing, satay made of mutton or goat meat.
- Serundeng, spicy fried coconut flakes, which is made from sautéing grated coconut, and is often used as a side dish to accompany rice.
- Soto madura, soto soup made with either chicken, beef or offal, in a yellowish transparent broth.
- Sup kambing, mutton soup prepared with goat meat, tomato, celery, spring onion, ginger, candlenut and lime leaf, its broth is yellowish in colour.

=== Snacks and desserts ===
- Apem, traditional cake of steamed dough made of rice flour, coconut milk, yeast and palm sugar, usually served with grated coconut.
- Dawet, iced sweet dessert that contains droplets of green rice flour jelly, coconut milk and palm sugar syrup.
- Lopis, traditional sweet cake made of glutinous rice, served with grated coconut and drizzled with thick coconut sugar syrup.

== See also ==
- Cuisine of Indonesia
- List of Indonesian dishes
- Madurese people
- Javanese cuisine
