= Sup kambing =

Indonesian mutton soup dish

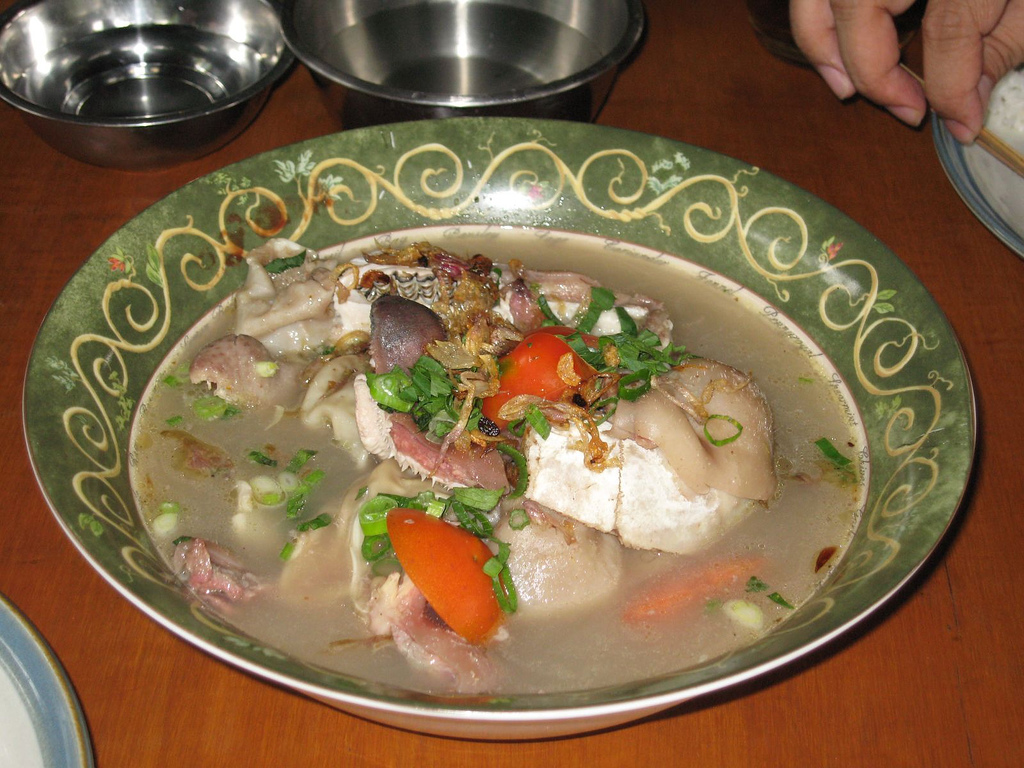
- Sup kepala kambing, goat's head soup served in Indonesia.
- Alternative names: Sop kambing
- Type: Soup
- Course: Main course
- Associated cuisine: Indonesia, Malaysia, Singapore
- Serving temperature: Hot
- Main ingredients: Mutton or goat meat

Sup kambing or sop kambing (Indonesian and Malay for 'goat soup') is a Southeast Asian mutton soup, commonly found in Brunei Darussalam, Indonesia, Malaysia, Singapore. It is prepared with goat meat, tomato, celery, spring onion, ginger, candlenut and lime leaf, its broth is yellowish in colour. Sup kambing is quite widespread as numbers of similar goat meat soup recipes can be found throughout Malaysia, Indonesia and Singapore.

In Indonesia, it is mostly associated with Malay of Medan, Betawi and Madurese cuisine, although it is also common in Java. Nevertheless, Javanese are more likely to cook their goat meat as tongseng or Javanese-style soupy gulai instead. Traditionally, sup kambing together with gulai and sate kambing are quite widespread during Eid al-Adha, as large amount of goat meat and offals being distributed among people.

In Malaysia, sup kambing is also associated with the Muslim Malaysian Indian community and believed to be of Indian origin. In Singapore, the dish is also associated with the Muslim Indian community of the island.

== History ==
Despite its wide popularity in Maritime Southeast Asia, the question of origin however, might be owed to the Arabs and Muslim Indian migrations into the region. Sup kambing is believed to be of Arab origin, brought by the influx of Arabs migrants into the Malay Archipelago between the 18th century to 19th century, during colonial era. The Arabs settlers introduced and promoted goat, lamb and mutton as their preferred meat, thus several dishes influenced by Arab and Muslim Indian culinary traditions were introduced to Sumatra, Malay peninsula and Java. Around the same period, other mutton or goat-based dishes such as sate kambing, gulai kambing and tongseng also appeared in Java.

The early Arab immigrants settled in coastal towns of Sumatra and Java, and subsequently influenced the culture of native ethnic groups including Malays, the Betawis of Batavia (Jakarta), also Javanese and Madurese of East Java. The sup kambing was adopted by locals, and often linked to the Islamic festival of kurban (Eid al-Adha), where large numbers of cattle – including goats, are slaughtered and distributed among people. As the result, despite its Arab origin, today in Indonesia sup kambing is more associated with Malay, Madurese, and Betawi cuisine. Indonesian sup kambing uses carrot, tomato, and sometimes potato, which hints its European (possibly Portuguese or Dutch) influences. Tomato and potato are not available in Southeast Asia until European colonials brought them from the Americas around the 17th century. The sup kambing from Medan in North Sumatra however, is closer to the Malaysian version, since they commonly derived from Muslim Indian culture.

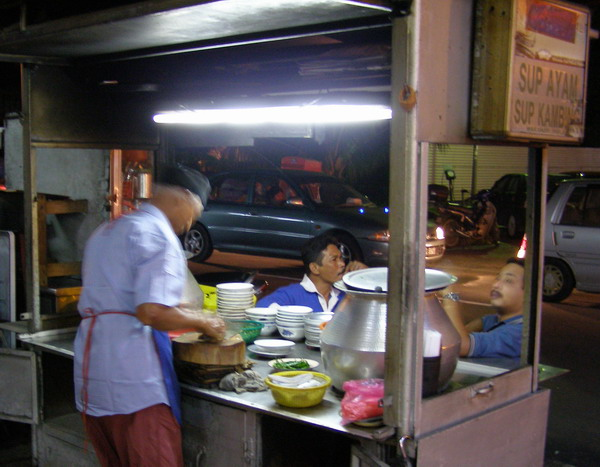
Sup Kambing stall in Kuala Lumpur.

In Malay Peninsula region, which today includes Malaysia and Singapore, the most popular version is sup kambing Mamak which is believed to have been invented by the Muslim Indian community there, where the use of typical spices is quite notable. There is no exact equivalent of this soup in Indian sub-continent, although the spices used and the style of cooking clearly demonstrates Indian influence. The most famous sup kambing in Singapore is the sup tulang merah which was invented by Baharudeen, Abdul Hameed (mammaka) and Abdul Kadir who were migrants from a remote village Thopputhurai in Tamilnadu. These three shops are located at Jalan Sultan, Beach Road. The dish is also adopted by native Malays in both countries.

== Ingredients ==
There are many versions of sup kambing recipes, however there are two main groups of sup kambing traditions; the Indonesian version are derived mainly from Arab, and to some extent, Dutch influences, while Malaysian and Singaporean version is often called as sup kambing Mamak which solely derived from Muslim Indian influences. Other main differences are the Malaysian and Singaporean version consists of the chunks of goat meat in yellowish, rather thick and oily broth with rich spices; while in Indonesian version, the goat meat often also includes its bones (ribs or leg bones), has a lighter broth and balanced spices, and it also contains slices of vegetables including tomato, leek, celery, carrot and sometimes potato.

A simple sup kambing recipe uses goat meat, slices of tomato, leek, celery, and ground spices which includes; ginger, pepper, garlic, shallot and salt. However, another elaborate recipes might add more complex spices, which might includes cardamom, cinnamon, candlenut, nutmeg, clove and star anise to add aroma and taste.

== Variations ==
In Indonesia, the soup is prepared in rich savoury broth with spices and ingredients similar to another Indonesian favourite, sop buntut (oxtail soup). Common sop kambing uses goat meat, including its ribs; however, in Indonesia, there is a more specific sop kambing called sop kepala kambing, which uses offals of the goat's head that includes its tongue, ear, lips and cheeks, eyes, and sometimes, brain. Another specific sup kambing is called sop kaki kambing, which uses the goat's trotters.

== See also ==
- List of Indonesian soups
- Mamak stall
