= Bhutan (dish) =

Nepalese dish

Bhutan (भुटन)
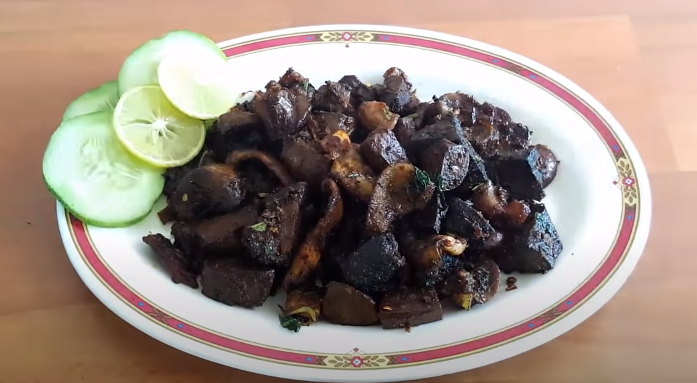
- Alternative names: Khasiko Bhutan
- Region or state: Kathmandu, Nepal
- Main ingredients: Goat tripe, shallots, onions, tomatoes, garlic, spices

Bhutan (Nepali: भुटन), commonly known as Khasiko Bhutan in Nepali, is a spicy dish prepared with goat tripe and other digestive parts that has been stir-fried in a wok or a frying pan with other ingredients like shallots, onions, tomatoes, garlic with other herbs and condiments. It also includes liver and kidneys. The Newari Cuisine variety uses buffalo's digestive organs instead of goat. It is often eaten during Dashain and in monsoon usually accompanied with soft drinks or alcohol. Nowadays, the dish is a staple on restaurant menus and one of the most popular fast foods in Nepal.

== See also ==
- List of goat dishes
- Nepalese cuisine
- Newari cuisine
