= Heugyeomso-tang =

Korean goat stew dish

- Type: Tang
- Place of origin: Korea
- Main ingredients: Goat meat

Korean name
- Hangul: 흑염소탕
- Hanja: 黑염소湯
- RR: heugyeomsotang
- MR: hŭgyŏmsot'ang
- IPA: [hɯ.ɡjʌm.so.tʰaŋ]

Heugyeomso-tang (흑염소탕) or Korean black goat stew, also known as Heugyeomso-jeongol (흑염소전골), is a Korean goat stew made from Korean Native goat (Capra hircus coreanae; KNG) the only breed of goats indigenous to Korea. There are variations, many of which contain perilla seeds, soybean paste, red pepper paste, mushrooms, and green vegetables such as leeks, cabbage, or perilla leaves.
