= Tongseng =

Indonesian goat meat soup dish

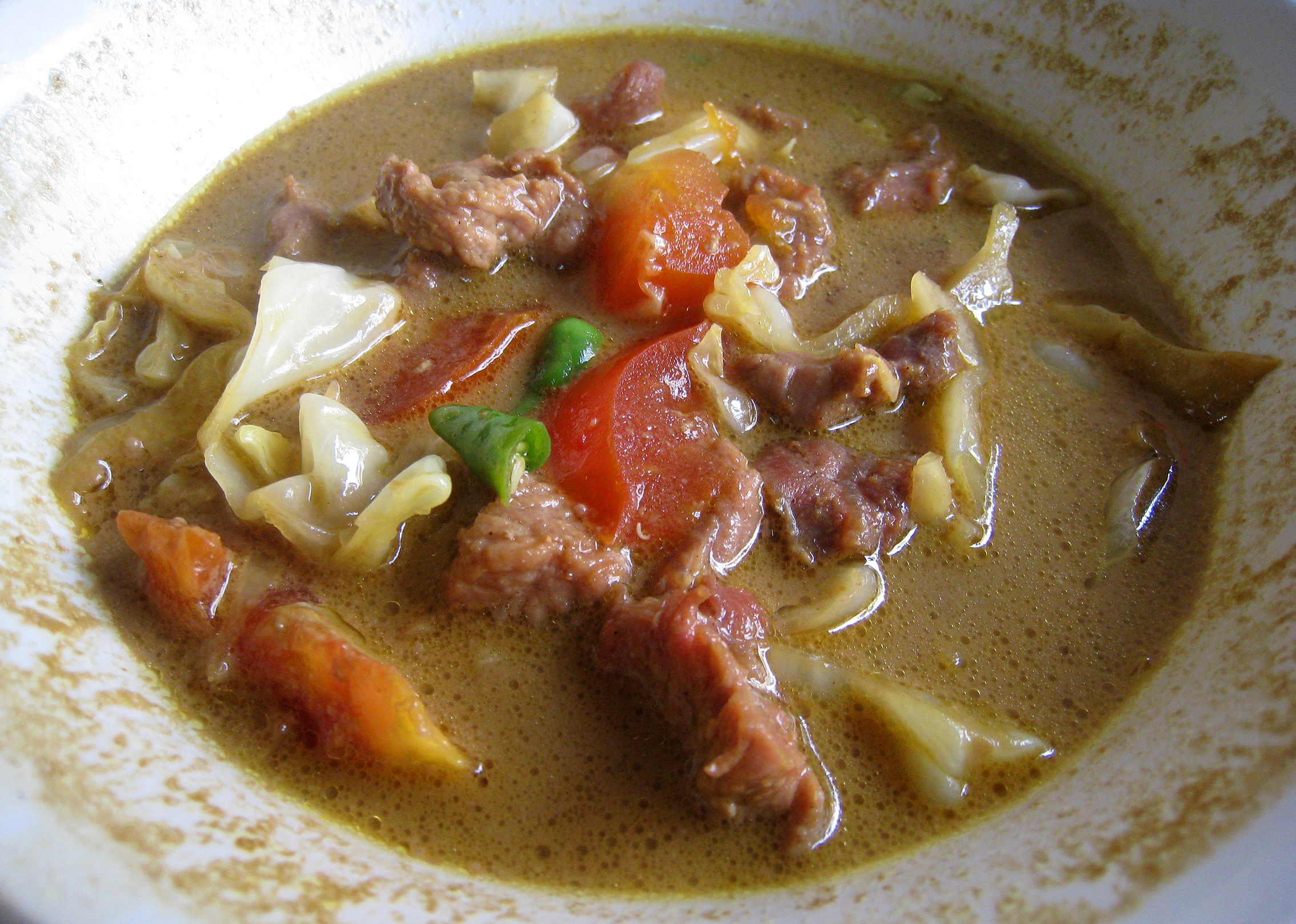
- A bowl of goat meat tongseng soup.
- Course: main course
- Place of origin: Indonesia
- Region or state: Boyolali and Solo in Central Java, and East Java
- Serving temperature: Hot
- Main ingredients: Meat (mutton or beef) and vegetables cooked in curry-like soup with sweet soy sauce
- Variations: Gulai

Tongseng is an Indonesian goat meat, mutton or beef stew dish in curry-like soup, with vegetables and kecap manis (sweet soy sauce). Tongseng is commonly found in the Indonesian region of Central Java; from Surakarta to Yogyakarta. However, it is believed that the dish originated from Klego district in Boyolali, Central Java.

== Ingredients and cooking method ==
The term tongseng is derived from the Javanese term osengan, "stir frying," referring to its cooking method. It also describes the "seng" sound of the metal frying spoon hitting the metal wok.

The soup is made up of a ground mixture of garlic, shallot, black pepper, ginger, coriander, galangal, daun salam (Indonesian bay leaves), and lemongrass sauteed with palm oil until aromatic. The diced meat is then added into the sauteed mixture and cooked. Usually, raw goat meat from sate kambing (lamb satay) is used. Water is then added until it boils. Then, sweet soy sauce and tamarind are added. After the water is reduced, shredded cabbages and sliced tomato are added to create a fresh and crisp texture. Some versions of tongseng are made with coconut milk. Slices of bird's eye chili are added for a hot and spicy version.

Tongseng is usually served with hot steamed rice. The soup of tongseng is similar to gulai soup; however, gulai is cooked without sweet soy sauce while the addition of sweet soy sauce in tongseng gives it a brown or gold appearance. Gulai usually uses beef offal while tongseng usually only uses meat (goat, lamb, mutton or beef).

== History ==
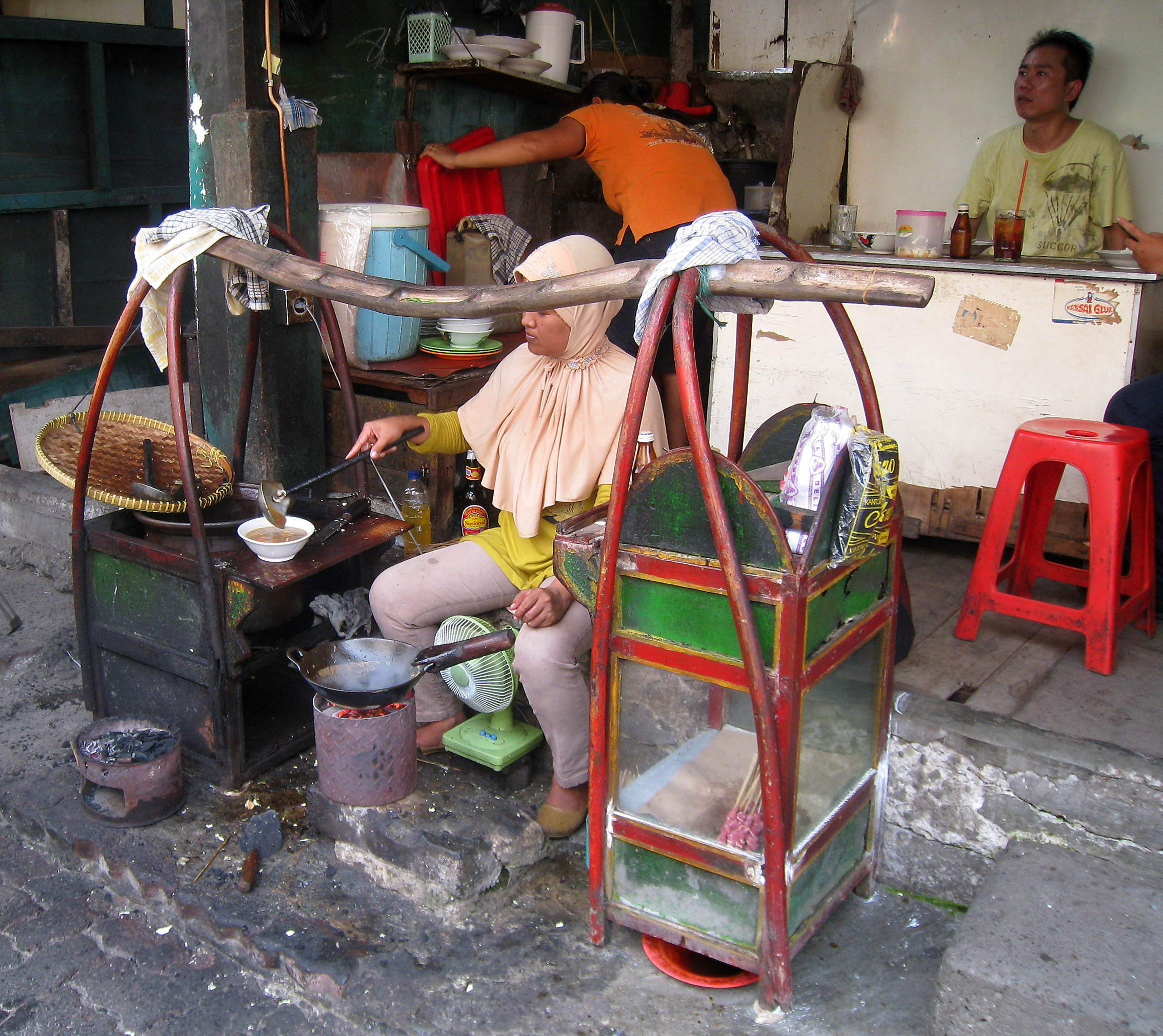
A tongseng seller preparing the dish

Traditionally, tongseng is considered as the merge between goat satay and gulai spicy soup. According to Indonesian culinary expert, tongseng started to appear in Java between the 18th to 19th century CE. At that time, during colonial era, there were significant influx of Arabs and Muslim Indians migrated into Indonesian archipelago. The Arabs settlers introduced and promoted goat, lamb and mutton as their preferred meat, thus several dishes influenced by Arab and Muslim Indian culinary traditions were introduced to Java. Among others are sate kambing, which was believed to be the local adaptation of Indian-Muslim kebabs and gulai, which was a local adaptation of curry-based soup probably influenced by Indian cuisine.

During the 19th century, the southern area of Central Java was developed as sugar plantation, thus sugar mills were built. Next to common sugar, traditional Javanese palm sugar (gula jawa) were also produced in the region. Soy sauce factory also built in the region, as the result local Javanese developed kecap manis, which is sweet soy sauce made of a mixture of soy sauce and palm sugar. This sweet soy sauce become the main sauce that combine the savoury gulai soup with pieces of goat satay and the fresh crisp of cabbages and tomato.

Today, tongseng is a common dish in Javanese cities of Boyolali, Surakarta (Solo), Klaten, and Yogyakarta, thus most of tongseng sellers hailed from those towns. The dish is also can be found in Indonesian major cities, such as Jakarta, Bandung, Semarang and Surabaya. Tongseng sellers usually marketed themselves as Warung Sate Solo, a warung or small modest restaurant that specialized in offering satay, tongseng and gulai as their main fare.

== See also ==
- List of goat dishes
- List of Indonesian soups
