= Cabrito =

Spanish and Portuguese for roast goat kid

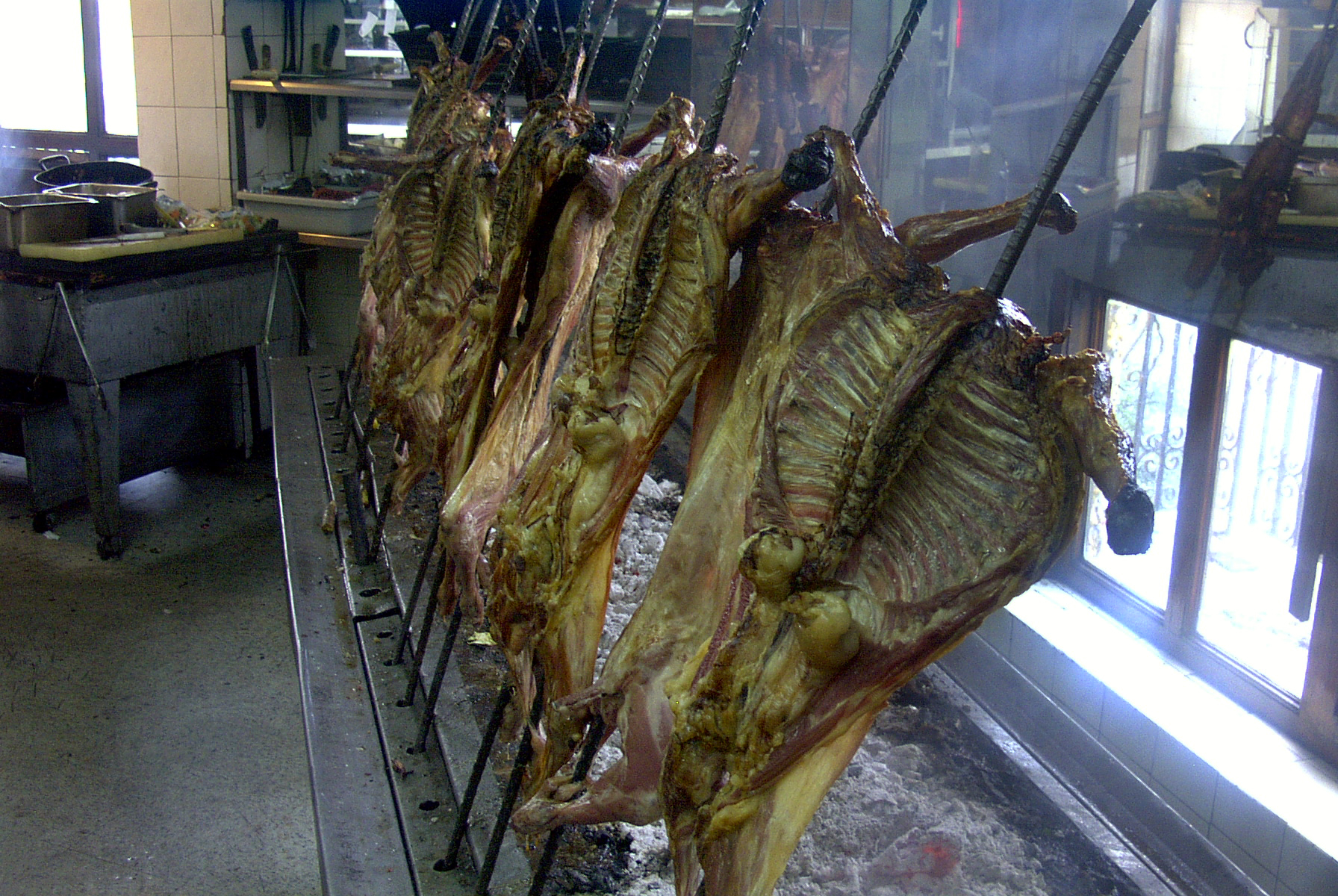
Cabritos

Cabrito (Spanish: [kaˈβɾito]) is the name in both Spanish and Portuguese for roast goat kid in various Iberian and Latin American cuisines.

== Argentina ==
Cabrito is eaten in the Córdoba Province in Argentina, especially the town of Quilino, which has a festival in its honour. "Chivito" differs from "cabrito" in that chivito is a slightly older animal with less tender meat. The chivito has already begun to eat solid foods, whereas the cabrito is still a suckling.

== Mexico ==
It is also associated with the city of Monterrey, Mexico, and the surrounding state of Nuevo Leon, based on the Spanish cuisine of the founders of the city.

In northern Mexico and South Texas cabrito is cooked in a variety of ways:

- Cabrito al pastor: The best-known and perhaps most popular form. The whole carcass is opened flat and impaled on a spit. The spit is then placed next to a bed of glowing embers and roasted slowly in the open air without seasonings other than the light scent it will absorb from the slow-burning charcoal.
- Cabrito al horno (oven-roasted cabrito): Toasted slowly in an oven at low temperatures. A number of variants of this preparation have emerged, including some elaborate processes that involve applying seasonings and covering the cooking meat at specific times to produce the desired flavour and juiciness.
- Cabrito en salsa (cabrito in sauce): The animal is cut into portions, browned in oil and braised in a tomato-based sauce with onions, garlic and green chilies, and other seasonings until tender.
- Cabrito en sangre (cabrito in blood), sometimes fritada de cabrito: A less common preparation in which the blood of the animal is collected when it is slaughtered and it becomes the basis for the sauce that the goat is braised in, along with the animal's liver, kidneys, and heart, and other seasonings. The end product is tender cabrito in a rich, very dark sauce.

== Portugal and Brazil ==
In Portuguese, the name cabrito is used for a goat kid (not just roasted) in Northeast Region, Brazil, especially in the Sertão Nordestino and in Portugal. The goat being about 3 months old is slow-cooked over a charcoal fire for about eight hours, turning it every 15-20 minutes. In certain parts of Portugal, cabrito dishes are traditionally served on special ceremonies, namely on weddings and Christmas.

== United States ==
Goat is little eaten in the United States, due to a reputation of the animals as dirty and for the odour released during the mating season. Cabrito, eaten in Tex-Mex versions along the Rio Grande border are a rare exception. In the US, cabrito is produced in various methods of barbecue. The name is also used by goat herders for a range of products they make from their animals, including sausages and jerky.

== See also ==
- List of goat dishes
- List of Mexican dishes
