= Nkwobi =

Delicacy made of cuts of cow feet

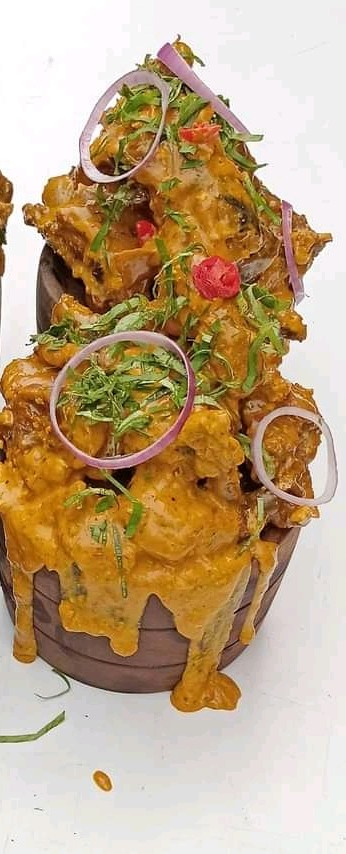
- Nkwobi
- Type: Beef Dish
- Place of origin: Igboland
- Region or state: South East (Nigeria)
- Main ingredients: Cow feet; Palm oil; Potash; Ehuru
- Ingredients generally used: Onions; Ugba

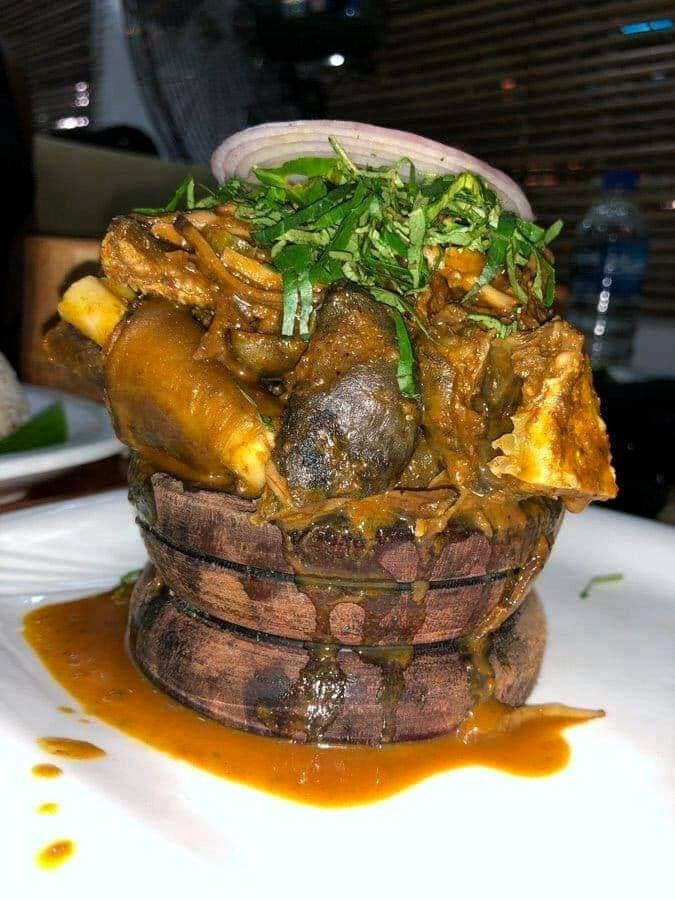
Nkwobi

Nkwobi is Nigerian food commonly found in the Southern region. It originates from the Igbo tribe. It is a soup made up of cuts from cow feet. It is similar to Isi ewu to the extent that most people conflate the two, but their modes of preparation are different. While Nkwobi is prepared with de-hoofed cow feet, Isi ewu, just as the name implies, is prepared with a goat’s head.

== Overview ==
Nkwobi is made from cow feet boiled with onion and a variety of spices. The ingredients needed to make the dish include palm oil, kaun (also known as potash), calabash nutmegs, utazi leaves, pepper, and onion, among others. Ngu (palm ash) can be used as an alternative to potash, and spinach can be used as a substitute for utazi. Potash mixture is added to palm oil, and stirred until yellow and thickened. Crayfish, calabash nutmeg and ground pepper are added afterward. The cooked cow feet is then added into the oil mixture and stirred gently to avoid burning. Nkwobi more commonly found in restaurants and social events than it is homemade.

The meal can be ready in 15 minutes when the cow leg is cooked overnight and stored in the fridge before being prepared the next day. It is a rich, creamy, and spicy dish.

== See also ==
- Cow's trotters
- List of beef dishes
- List of African dishes
- Nigerian cuisine
- Igbo cuisine
- Tripe
