= Char-grilled steak =

Method of cooking meat

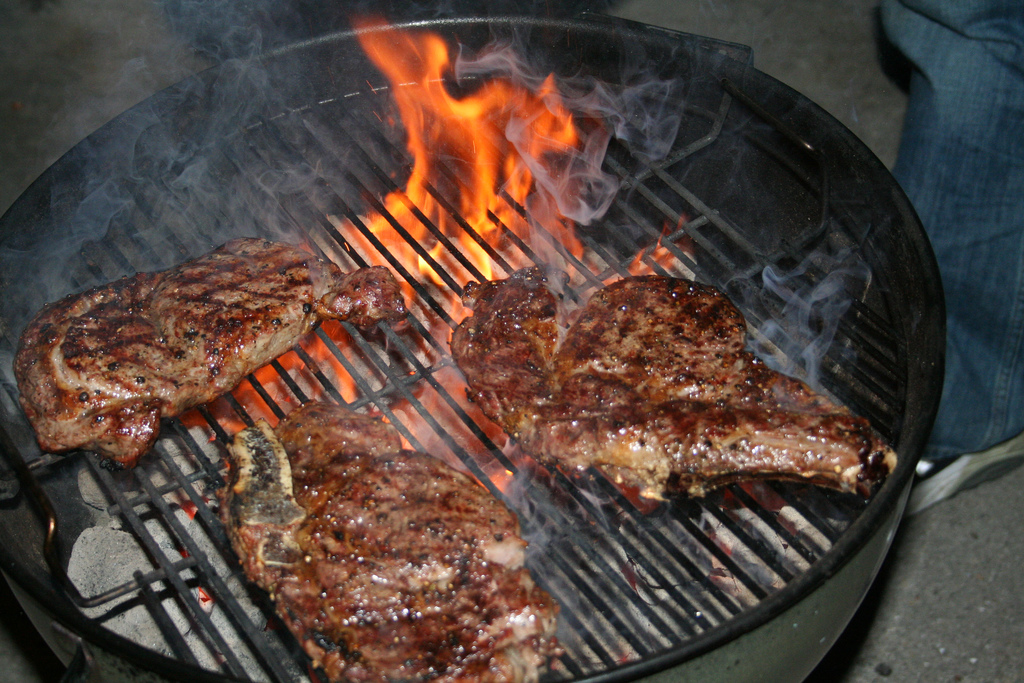
Chuck steaks cooked over an open-top charcoal grill using charcoal briquettes

Char-grilled steak (also charcoal steak) is a method of preparing meat for human consumption. Although various animal steaks can technically be char-grilled, the process is generally used to cook chuck steaks. Char-grilled steaks are grilled with charcoal, and are not to be confused with gas-grilled steaks, which are usually grilled with propane. The richness of flavor of steaks cooked in this manner is usually attributed to the charcoal used to prepare them.
