= Gongronema =

Scientific classification
- Kingdom: Plantae
- Clade: Tracheophytes
- Clade: Angiosperms
- Clade: Eudicots
- Clade: Asterids
- Order: Gentianales
- Family: Apocynaceae
- Subfamily: Asclepiadoideae
- Tribe: Marsdenieae
- Genus: Gongronema (Endl.) Decne.

Synonyms
- Gymnema sect. Gongronema Endl.

Genus of plants

Gongronema is a genus of plants first described as a genus in 1844. Some of the species are native to Africa, with others in South and Southeast Asia. The following species are accepted:

1. Gongronema angolense (N.E.Br.) Bullock - Angola
2. Gongronema bracteolatum King & Gamble - W Malaysia
3. Gongronema curtisii King & Gamble - W Malaysia
4. Gongronema filipes Kerr - Thailand
5. Gongronema finlaysonii (Wight) Decne. - Thailand
6. Gongronema gaudichaudii Warb. - Vietnam
7. Gongronema gazense (S.Moore) Bullock - Mozambique
8. Gongronema latifolium Benth. - W Africa
9. Gongronema multibracteolatum P.T.Li & X.M.Wang - Guizhou Province in China
10. Gongronema nepalense (Wall.) Decne. - Nepal, India, Laos, S China (Guangdong, Guangxi, Guizhou, Hainan, Tibet, Yunnan)
11. Gongronema obscurum Bullock - W Africa
12. Gongronema taylorii (Schltr. & Rendle) Bullock - tropical Africa
13. Gongronema thomsonii (Hook.f.) K.M.Matthew - Sikkim, Bhutan, E Himalaya
14. Gongronema ventricosum Hook.f. - Assam
15. Gongronema wallichii (Wight) Decne. - Singapore
16. Gongronema wrayi King & Gamble - W Malaysia

It also formerly included the following:

1. Gongronema attenuatum, syn of Gymnema attenuatum
2. Gongronema hemsleyanum, syn of Biondia hemsleyana
3. Gongronema membranifollum, syn of Heterostemma membranifolium
4. Gongronema micradenia, syn of Gymnema micradenium
5. Gongronema recurvifolium, syn of Gymnema recurvifolium
6. Gongronema welwitschii, syn of Sphaerocodon obtusifolium
7. Gongronema yunnanense, syn of Marsdenia yunnanensis
