= Goat meat =

Meat of the domestic goat

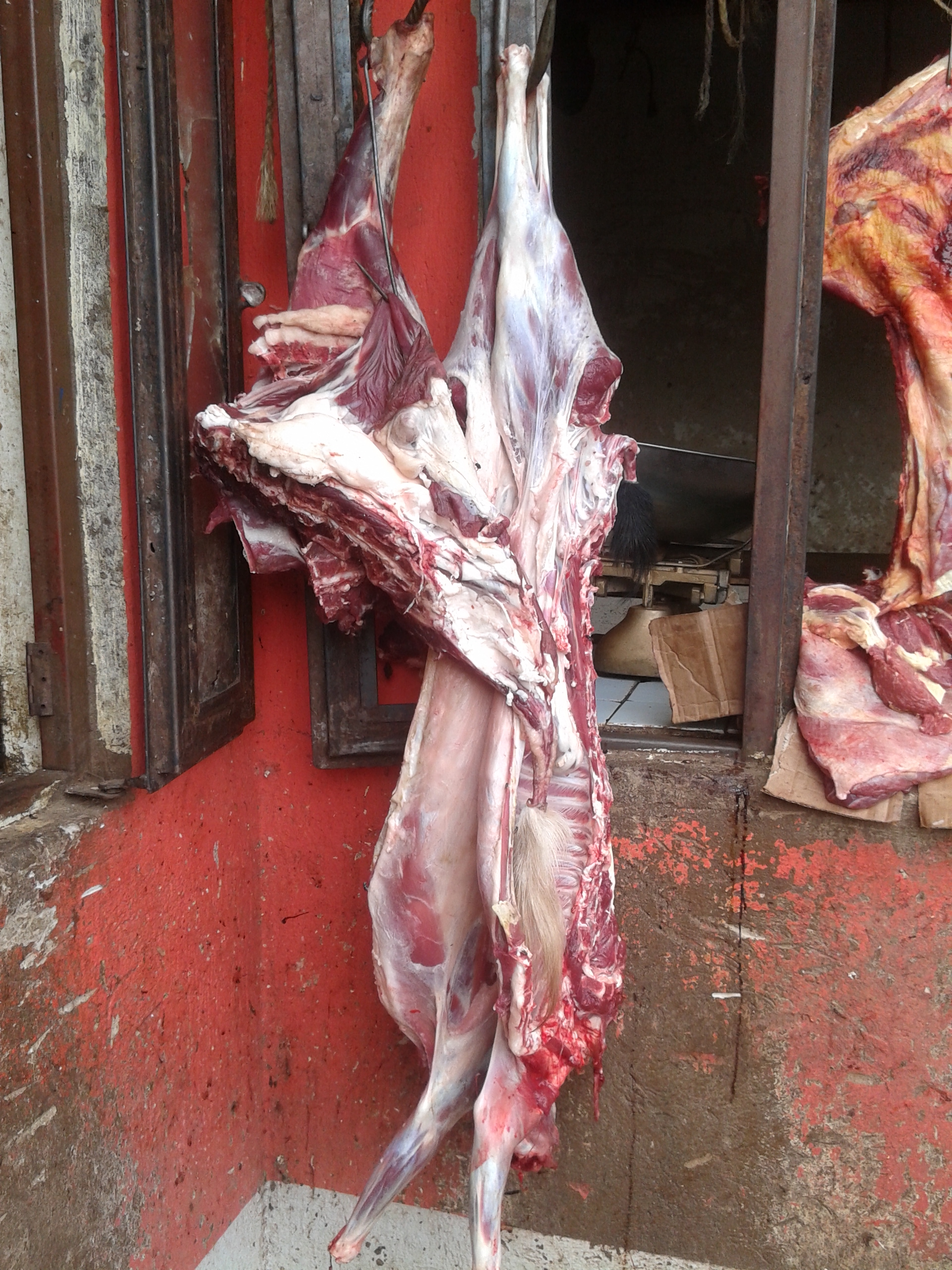
Butchered goat carcass, Nigeria

Goat meat is the meat of the domestic goat (Capra hircus). The term denotes especially the meat of older animals, while meat from young goats is called kid meat. In South Asian cuisine, goat meat is commonly called "mutton", which elsewhere in the world means sheep meat.

== Food ==
Goat meat is both a staple and a delicacy in the world's cuisines. The cuisines best known for their use of goat include African cuisine, Indian, Middle Eastern, Indonesian, Mediterranean, Nepali, Bangladeshi, Pakistani, Sri Lankan cuisine, Abruzzese, Mexican, Caribbean (Trinidad and Tobago, Jamaica), Haitian cuisine, Dominican cuisine and Ecuadorian. Cabrito, which is baby goat, is a typical food of Monterrey, Nuevo León, Mexico; in Italy it is called "capretto". Goat meat can be prepared in a variety of ways, such as being stewed, curried, baked, grilled, barbecued, minced, canned, fried, or made into sausage. Goat jerky is another popular variety.

=== Africa ===
Goat meat is used in a great number of traditional ceremonies in many parts of Africa. In Kenya, for instance, it is more likely to find a goat slaughtered in many a household, as opposed to a cow or even chicken. Much "choma" or barbecued meat is made with goat meat and is a great delicacy in many parts of the country. Among the Chaga people of Tanzania, a ceremonial goat (locally called ndafu) is gutted and roasted whole as part of a centuries-old tradition. The ceremonial goat is the preferred replacement to the wedding cake used in many weddings around the world.

=== Europe ===
Italian, Greek, Serbian, and Portuguese cuisines are also known for serving roast goat in celebration of Easter, with the North of Portugal serving it as well on Christmas Day; goat dishes are also an Easter staple in the alpine regions of central Europe, often braised (Bavaria) or breaded and fried (Tyrol).

=== North America ===
Goat has historically been less commonplace in American and Canadian cuisines but has become more popular in some niche markets, including those that serve immigrants from Asia and Africa who prefer goat to other meat.

While in the past goat meat in the West was confined to ethnic markets, it can now be found in a few upscale restaurants and purveyors, especially in cities such as New York City and San Francisco. "Conscious consumers" in America who prioritize buying food consistent with their values have been assessed as seeing wild-caught rangeland goat meat as more environmentally sustainable and healthy than other red meats. Meanwhile, certain Costco stores are known to keep whole frozen goats.

Brady, Texas, has held its Annual World Championship BBQ Goat Cook-Off annually since 1973.

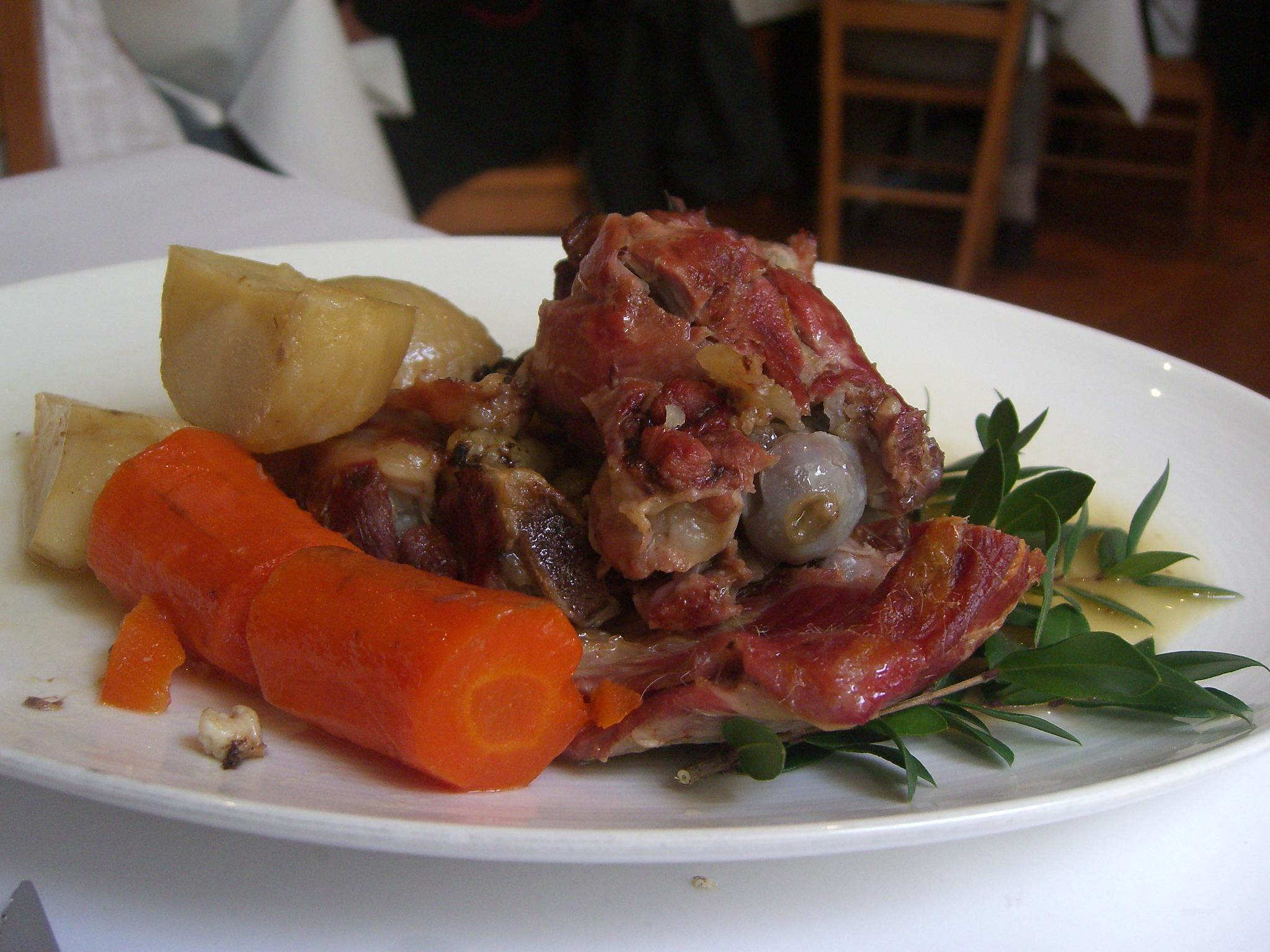
Roasted kid

=== Latin America ===
Cabrito, a specialty especially common in Latin American cuisine such as Mexican, Peruvian, Brazilian, and Argentine, is usually slow roasted. In Mexican cuisine, there are a variety of dishes including birria (a spicy goat stew) and cabrito entomatado which means it is boiled in a tomato and spices sauce.

=== Asia ===
In Okinawa (Japan), goat meat is served raw in thin slices as yagisashi.

On the Indian subcontinent, Mutton biryani and mutton curry are prepared in parts of Uttar Pradesh, Andhra Pradesh, Telangana and Bihar, use goat meat as a primary ingredient to produce a rich taste. Goat curry is a common traditional Indo-Caribbean dish. In Bangladesh, West Bengal, traditional meat dishes like kosha gosht and rezala are prepared using meat from goats with meat that has rich taste and a gamey flavour. Goat meat is a popular red meat choice in Sri Lanka, especially amongst the Sri Lankan Tamil population. Dishes include; mutton curry, mutton rolls and roti. Goat meat is also a major delicacy in Nepal, and goats are sacrificed during Dashain, the largest annual celebrations in the country, as well as on other festive occasions. There are many separate dishes, which together include all edible parts of the animal. Bhutun is made from the intestines and stomach, rakhti from the blood, karji-marji from the liver and lungs, and the feet – khutti – are often made into soup. Sukuti is a kind of jerky, while sekuwa is made from roasted meat and often eaten with alcoholic beverages. In addition to these dishes, goat meat is often eaten as part of momos, thukpa, chow mein and other dishes in various parts of the country. Taasa is another popular fried goat meat dish in Nepal, particularly popular in districts of the central region.

In Indonesia, goat meat is popularly skewered and grilled as sate kambing, or curried in soups such as sup kambing and Gulai kambing.

In Filipino cuisine, goat meat, or in Filipino kambing, was cooked in multiple varieties, such as sinampalukan, papaitan, caldereta, kilawin and others. It was commonly seen and used in Ilocano cuisine.

=== Oceania ===
As of 2025, the goat meat industry in Australia was still in its infancy, even though the First Fleet, which brought the first goats to the country in 1788, had had a larger inventory of goats than cattle.

One butcher told ABC News that year that he did not stock a lot of goat meat. Customers often described it as gamey, and not necessarily tastier than lamb; he assumed that a lot of it was purchased for curries. Another butcher said that the product was of inconsistent quality, as much of it came from culled wild goats. However, a goat producer from western New South Wales said she was often telling people that "there's more to goat than curry", and had started creating goat salami to make goat meat more accessible. She also aspired to see Australians cooking or eating more meals such as goat pies, sausages and steaks.

== Characteristics ==
Goat meat has a reputation for having a strong, gamey flavor, but the taste can also be mild, depending on how it is raised and prepared. Caribbean cultures often prefer meat from mature goats, which tends to be more pungent, while some other cultures prefer meat that comes from younger goats that are six to nine months old. Ribs, loins, and tenderloin goat meat are suitable for quick cooking, while other cuts are best for long braising. Despite being classified as red meat, goat is leaner and contains less cholesterol and fat than both lamb and beef, and less energy than beef and lamb; therefore, it requires low-heat, slow cooking to preserve tenderness and moisture.

== Production ==
Goats consume less forage than beef cattle. A hectare of pasture can sustain 25 goats or more, compared to five cattle. A goat produces 18 kg (40 lb) of meat, which is much less than that of cattle and pigs, making goats unsuitable for modern meat processors.

Production of goat meat

Production of goat meat per animal

=== North America ===
As of 2011 the number of goats slaughtered in the United States had doubled every 10 years for three decades, rising to nearly one million annually.

=== Oceania ===
As of the early 2020s, Australia was responsible for only 0.4% of worldwide goat meat production, and its domestic market was small; only 9% of locally produced goat meat was consumed there. However, the country was also the world's largest exporter of the product, with 35% of all goat meat exports, accounting for 44% of the global export value of the product. Most of Australia's goat meat exports were in the form of frozen whole carcasses.

The country's biggest market for the product was the United States, with an average 60% volume share in the first half of the decade. The next largest markets were South Korea, China and the Caribbean.

According to Meat & Livestock Australia (MLA), 2,364,307 goats were slaughtered in Australia in 2023. The figure for slaughtered goats published by the Australian Bureau of Statistics for the following year, 2024, was 3.5 million. MLA recorded that year's goat meat production in Australia as being 54,017 tonnes (53,164 long tons; 59,544 short tons), the highest tonnage ever.

The bulk of Australia's goat meat is produced from feral rangeland goats, captured and gathered through goat depots, and then sent to an abattoir. However, some producers have adopted managed programs capable of breeding meatier animals more consistent in size and quality. Feral goats range all over Australia, but are most prevalent in western New South Wales, where the population was estimated in 2020 at 4.9 million.

== Nutrition and health effects ==
Goat is a form of red meat. Red meat is a good source of protein, iron, zinc, and vitamins B_{1}, B_{2}, B_{6}, and B_{12}. According to the International Agency for Research on Cancer (IARC), unprocessed red meat probably causes cancer, particularly colorectal cancer. Studies have also linked red meat with higher risks of cardiovascular disease and type 2 diabetes. If meat is processed, such as by salting, curing, or smoking, health risks further increase. The World Cancer Research Fund recommends limiting red meat to no more than three servings per week.

Amount Per 100 grams
Energy : 600 kJ (143 kcal)

% Daily Value
Protein 27.1 g	54%
Total Fat 3.03 g	4%
Saturated fat 0.9 g	4%
Cholesterol 75 mg	25%
Carbohydrate 0 g	0%
Iron 3.73 mg	20%
Phosphorus 201 mg	28%
Potassium 405 mg	11%
Sodium 86 mg	3%
Zinc 5.27 mg	55%
Selenium 11.8 μg	21%
Niacin–Vitamin B_{3} 3.95 mg	24%
Choline 106 mg	21%
Vitamin B_{12} 1.19 μg	20%

== Chevon ==
The culinary name chevon, a blend of the French words chèvre 'goat' and mouton 'sheep', was coined in 1922 and selected by a trade association; it was adopted by the United States Department of Agriculture in 1928, but the term never caught on and is not encountered in the United States, or anywhere else.

== See also ==
- Goat farming
- List of domesticated meat animals
- List of goat dishes
