= Sate kambing =

Indonesian goat meat dish

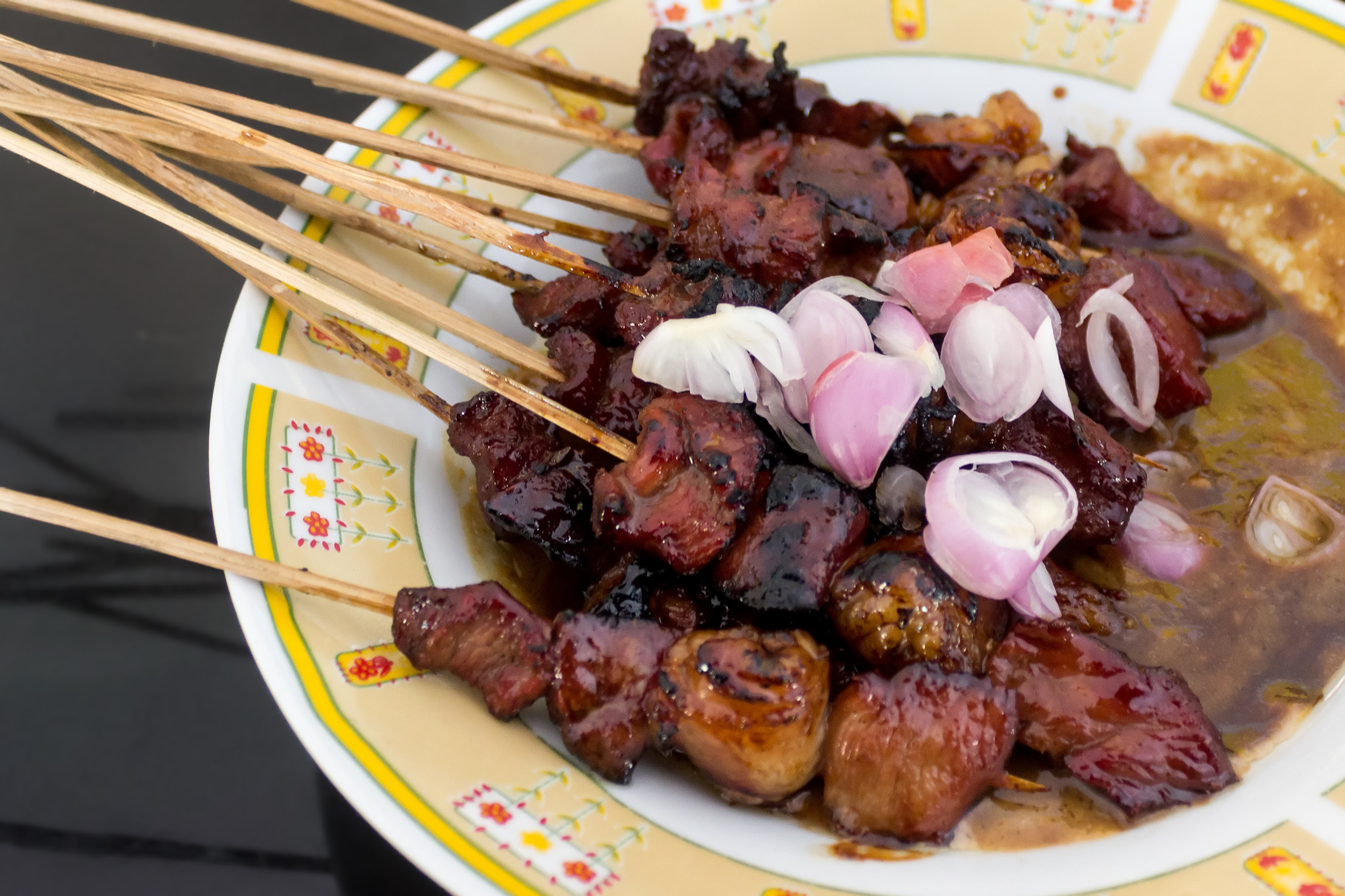
- Sate kambing served in peanut sauce, with shallot garnishing, Jombang
- Alternative names: goat satay, lamb satay, mutton satay
- Course: Main meal
- Place of origin: Indonesia
- Region or state: Java, and Nationwide
- Main ingredients: marinated goat meat, skewered and grilled on charcoal, served with sweet soy sauce or peanut sauce.

Sate kambing is the Indonesian name for "mutton satay". It is part of the cuisine of Indonesia. This food is made by grilling goat meat that has been mixed with seasoning. The dish is also called lamb satay and goat satay.

Sate kambing (goat satay) is very popular in the country, especially in Java, where several regional recipes appear; the most famous among others are sate kambing Jakarta (Jakarta lamb satay), sate kambing Tegal (Tegal lamb satay) from Central Java, sate Maranggi from West Java, and sate kambing Madura (Madura lamb satay) from East Java. Nevertheless, sate kambing (lamb satay) is a generic term to describes mutton satay in the region, regardless of their specific recipes.

== Ingredients ==
Goats are a widely consumed domesticated animal in Indonesia. They can easily be seen roaming the country's villages and are also kept as livestock in backyards. In a country with a majority Muslim population, goat meat or mutton is one of the most preferred meats. Goats and sheep are slaughtered during the Eid ul Adha Muslim religious holiday, resulting in goat/lamb dishes such as tongseng kambing, sate kambing (goat satay) and gule kambing (mutton curry) being commonly consumed during the festival.

Almost all parts of a goat's carcass meat could be used for sate kambing, although the prime part would be the hind legs. Some variants might use goat offal, which is considered a delicacy, such as sate hati kambing that uses goat liver, and sate torpedo that uses goat testicles, believed to have aphrodisiac properties.

The skewers used for sate kambing are usually larger and thicker, and made from bamboo, compared to thinner skewers used for chicken satay that are usually made from mid-ribs of coconut leaves. This corresponds to the thickness and texture of goat meat, which is tougher than chicken. To avoid burning, the skewers are usually soaked in water prior to use. The skewered mutton/lamb is then marinated in spices before being placed on a charcoal grill. The marination seasoning often includes puréed pineapple juice, sweet soy sauce, ground shallot and galangal. In restaurants or street stalls (warung), sate kambing is made to order and grilled after the customer places their order.

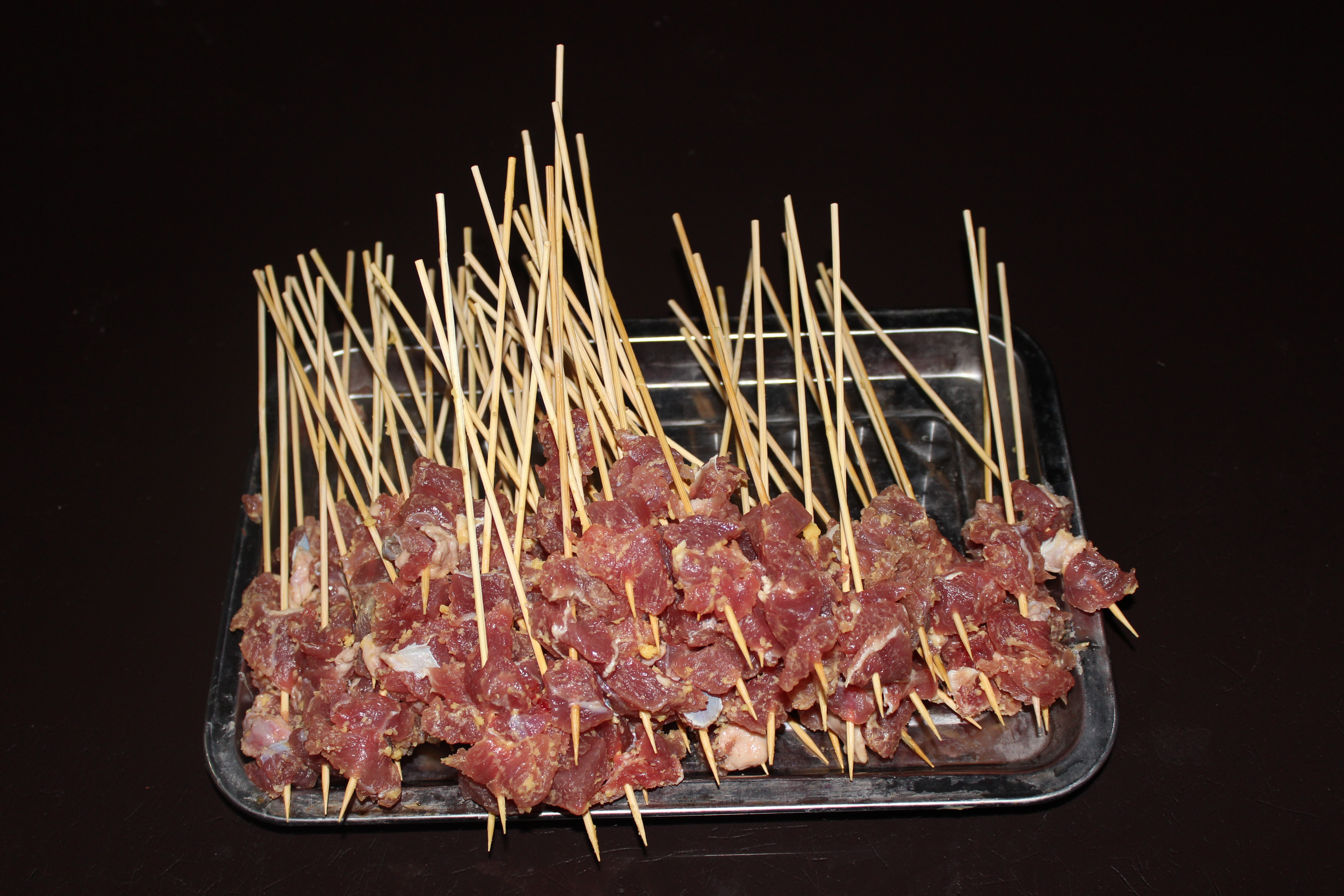
Raw sate kambing (lamb satay)

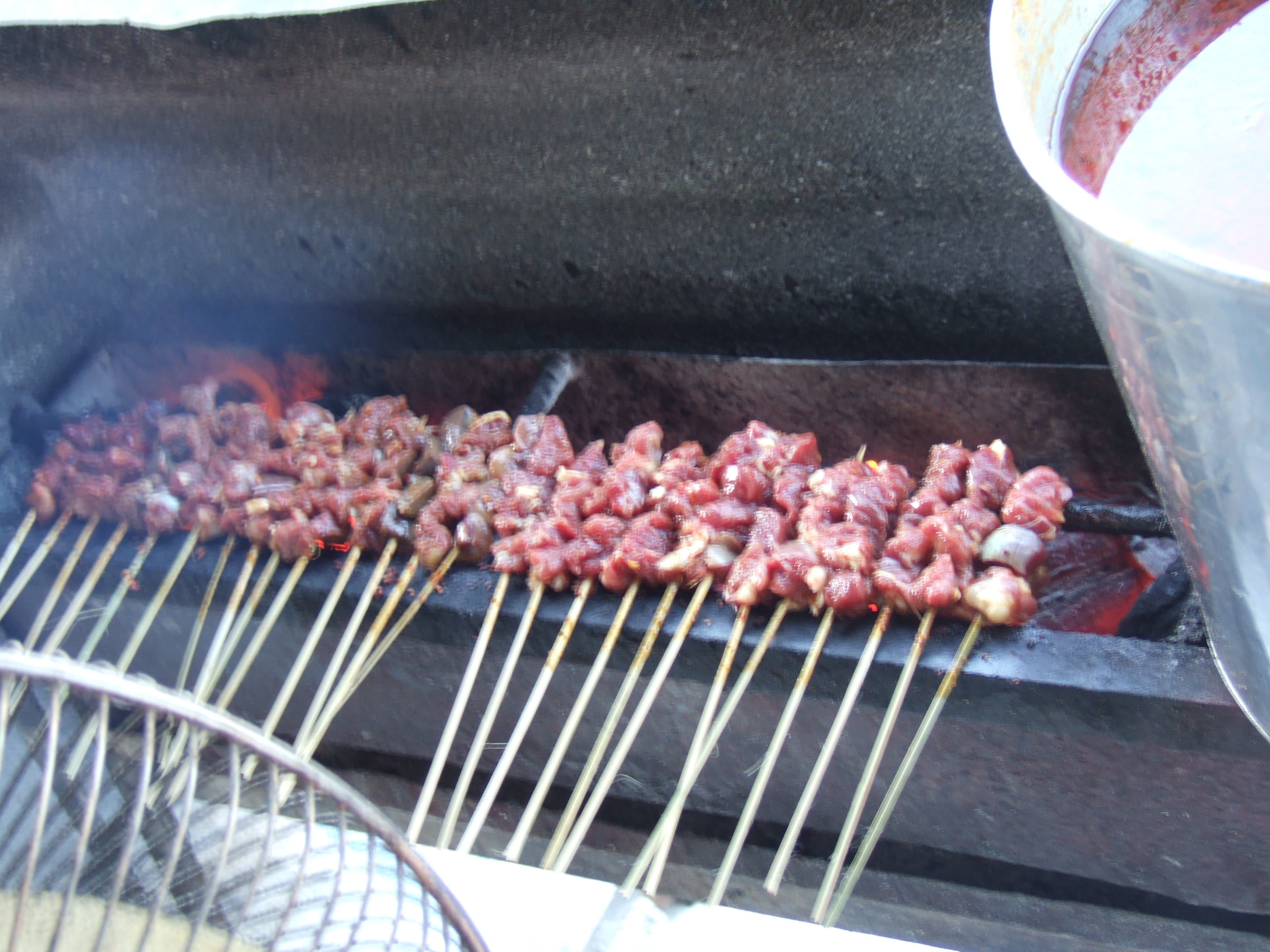
Raw sate kambing (lamb satay) being grilled

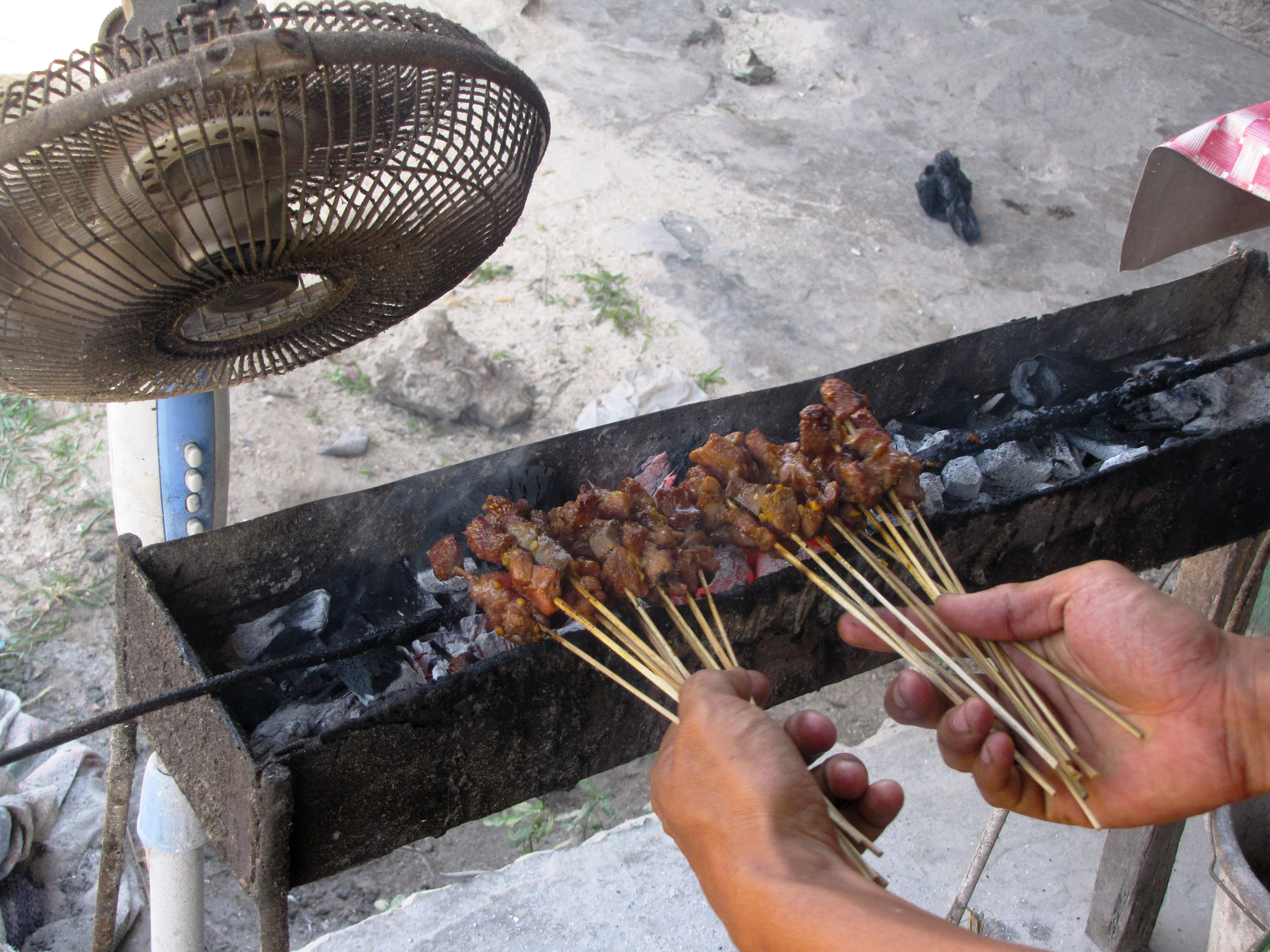
Sate kambing (lamb satay) almost done

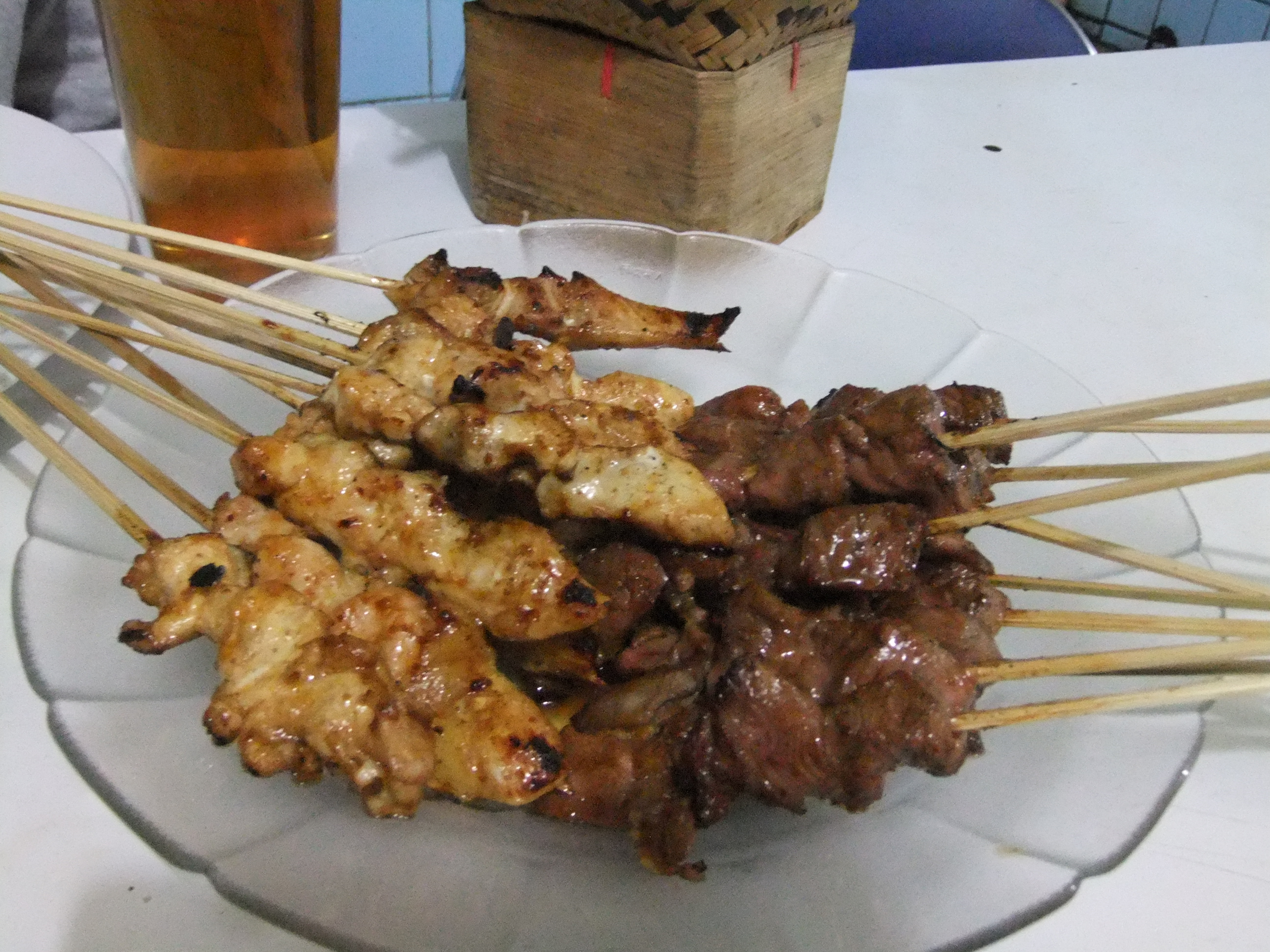
Cooked sate kambing (right) have darker colour compared to chicken satay (left)

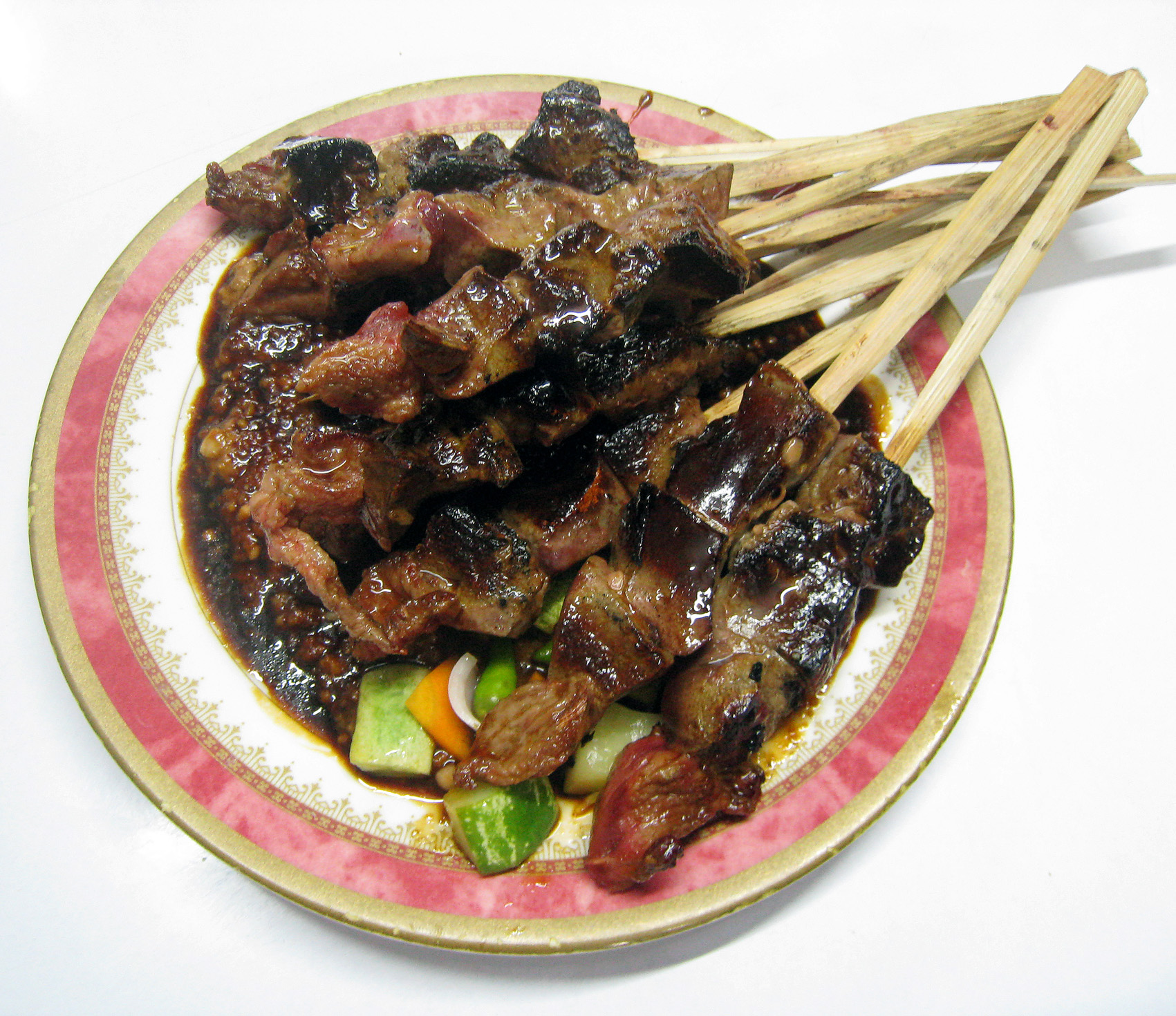
Sate hati kambing, goat liver satay

== Serving ==
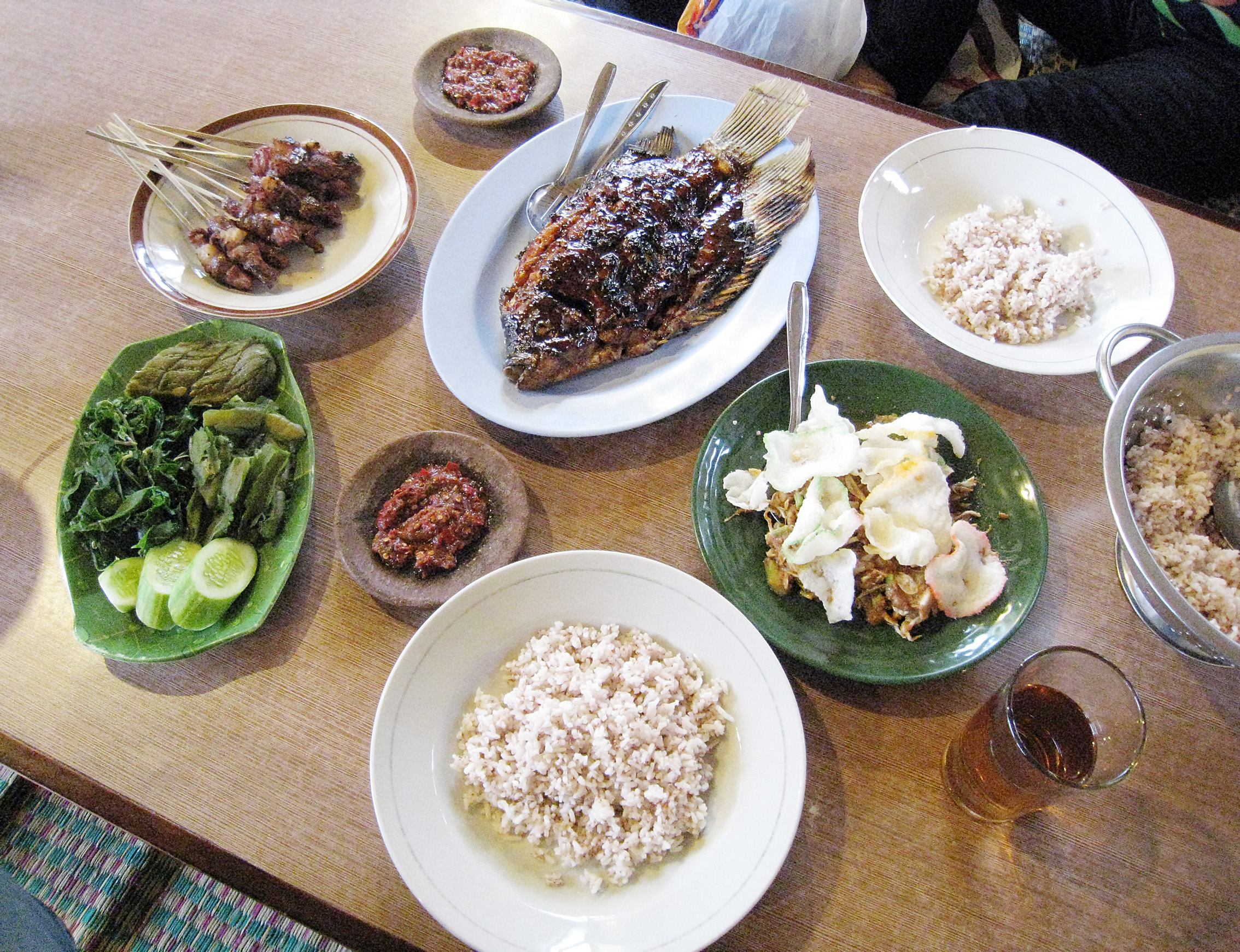
Sate kambing (upper left) as part of a complete meal.

A set meal of sate kambing (lamb satay) usually consists of the mutton satay itself, commonly served in a thick black-coloured sauce made of kecap manis or sweet soy sauce. Some recipes however, might use peanut sauce instead, although peanut sauce is more commonly served with chicken satay. Some people would eat it with common steamed rice, while others might prefer traditional cubed rice like lontong or ketupat. In some areas, sate kambing (lamb satay) is sold together with another popular food named Gulai kambing, which is spicy goat meat and offal soup.

Since goat meat has a somewhat distinct and quite strong aroma, those who do not like the smell usually would replace the goat meat with lamb or beef. Similar satay recipes might also be made with other types of meat, such as beef, chicken, fish, pork, and others.

== See also ==
- Satay
- Kebab
- List of goat dishes
- Yakitori
- Sate klatak
