= Latvian cuisine =

Culinary traditions of Latvia

Latvian cuisine typically consists of agricultural products, with meat featuring in most main dishes. Fish is commonly consumed due to Latvia's location on the eastern shore of the Baltic Sea.

Latvian cuisine has been influenced by other countries of the Baltic rim. Common ingredients in Latvian recipes are found locally, such as potatoes, wheat, barley, cabbage, onions, eggs and pork. Latvian cuisine is markedly seasonal, and every season has its own distinctive products and dishes.

== Meals ==
Breakfast is normally light and usually consists of sandwiches or an omelette with a drink, which is often milk. Lunch is eaten from noon time to 3 p.m., and tends to be the main meal of the day; as such it can include a variety of foods, and sometimes, there is also soup as an entrée and a dessert. Between lunch and supper, a smaller meal (launags) is sometimes had, usually consisting of a snack, fresh fruit, sweets or a small portion of savoury food. Consumption of ready-made or frozen meals is now common. Another small snack, known as naksniņas, is popular before bedtime.

== Common foods and dishes ==
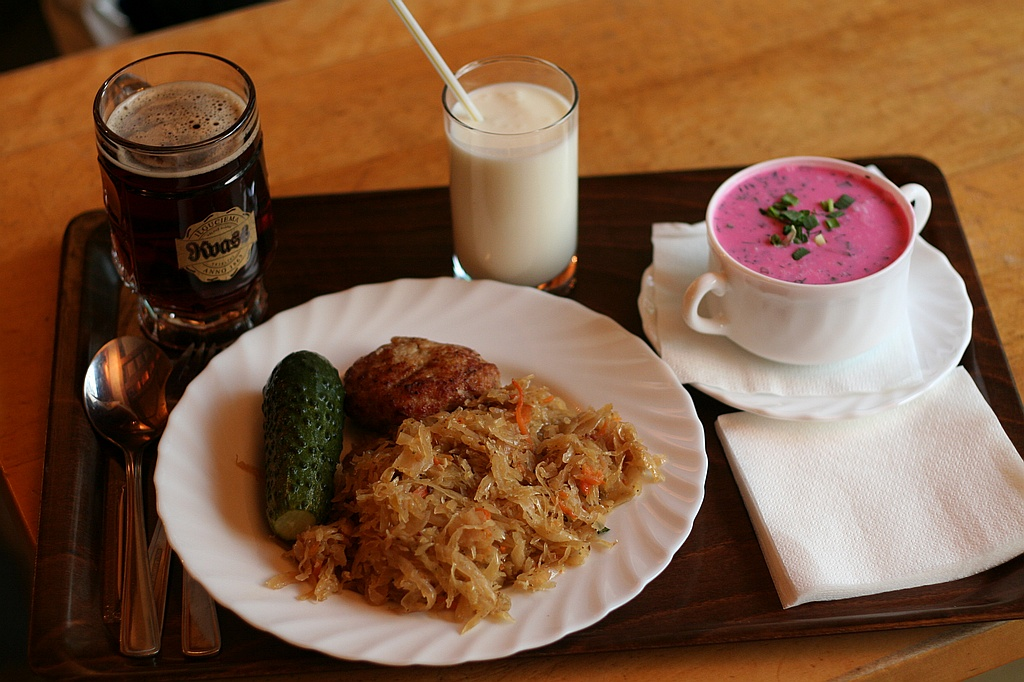
Latvian "Lido" lunch with cold borscht, sauerkraut, cutlet, gherkin, kefir and kvass

Latvian cuisine is typical of the Baltic region and, in general, of Northern Europe. Main dishes are often high in fats. In seasoning, dried spices, such as caraway, black pepper, allspice are used, and fresh herbs, such as parsley, spring onions and especially dill, are held in high regard.

Latvian cuisine originated from the peasant culture and is strongly based on crops that grow in Latvia's maritime, temperate climate. Rye, wheat, buckwheat, oats, peas, beets, cabbage, pork products, and potatoes are the staples. Latvian cuisine offers plenty of varieties of bread and dairy products, with dark rye bread (rupjmaize) considered to be a Latvian specialty. Meat features in most main dishes, but fish also is commonly consumed, especially in the coastal areas next to the Baltic Sea. Both hot- and cold-smoked varieties of meat and fish are common.

Many common dishes in contemporary Latvia have their roots in Slavic, Germanic and Nordic cultures. Popular dishes adopted from Soviet cuisine include pelmeni (pelmeņi) with sour cream, Ukrainian borsch (borščs), stroganoff (stroganovs), dressed herring (siļķe kažokā), shashlik (šašliks), rasol (rasols), plov (plovs), kefir (kefīrs), kvass and solyanka (soļanka), as well as dessert dishes such as medovik (meduskūka) and mille-feuille (Napoleona kūka). German influences can be seen in dishes such as caramelised sauerkraut (štovēti kāposti) and slammed pork patties (karbonāde).

Meatballs and cutlets, (Latvian pl. - kotletes) and various meat pies, or pierogi (Latvian pl. - pīrāgi) - particularly, speķrauši, the traditional Latvian meat-filled variant - are also very popular.

The most consumed alcoholic beverage is beer, with a flourishing craft beer scene. The national liquor is Riga Black Balsam.

=== Dairy products ===
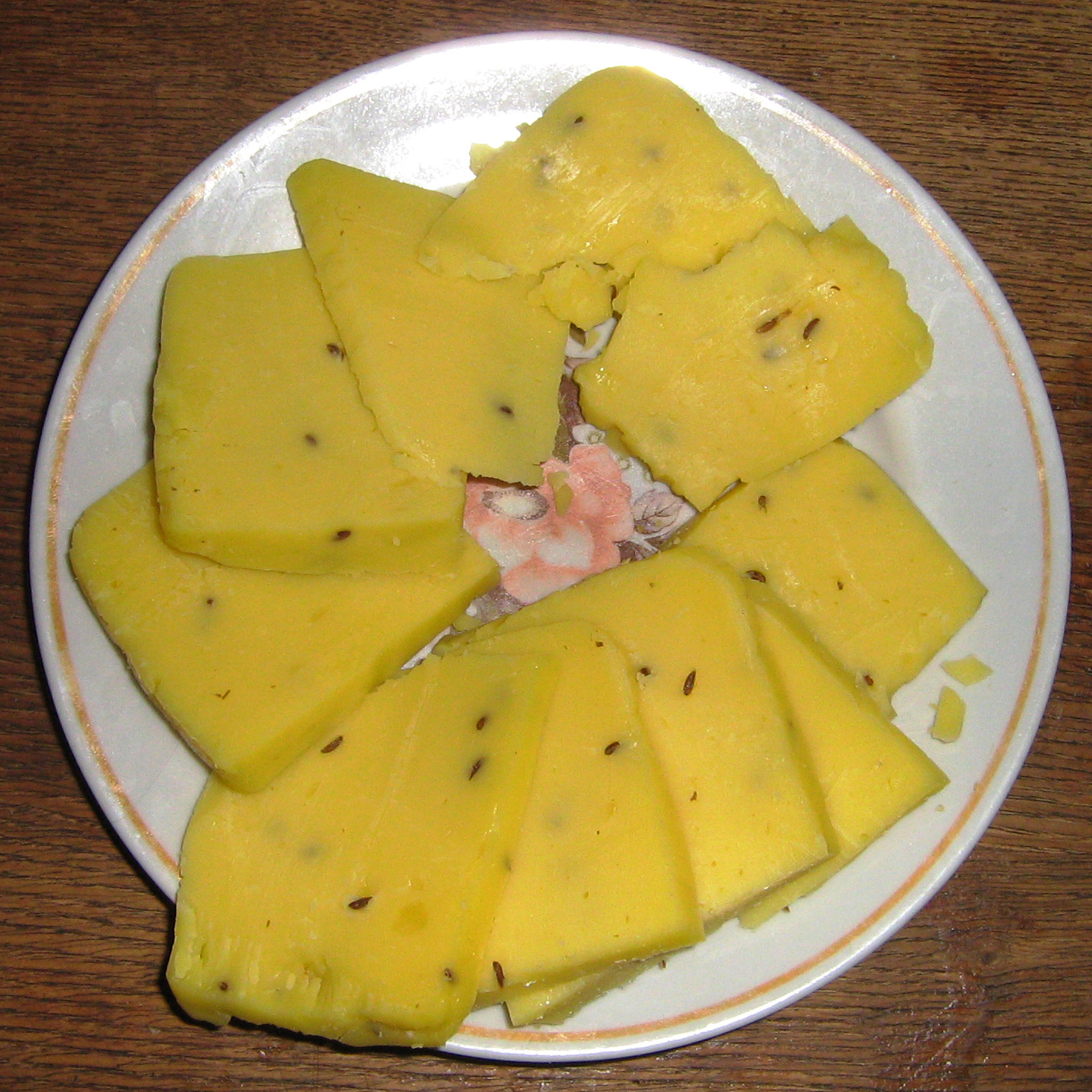
Jāņi cheese, a caraway cheese traditionally served on the summer festival Jāņi

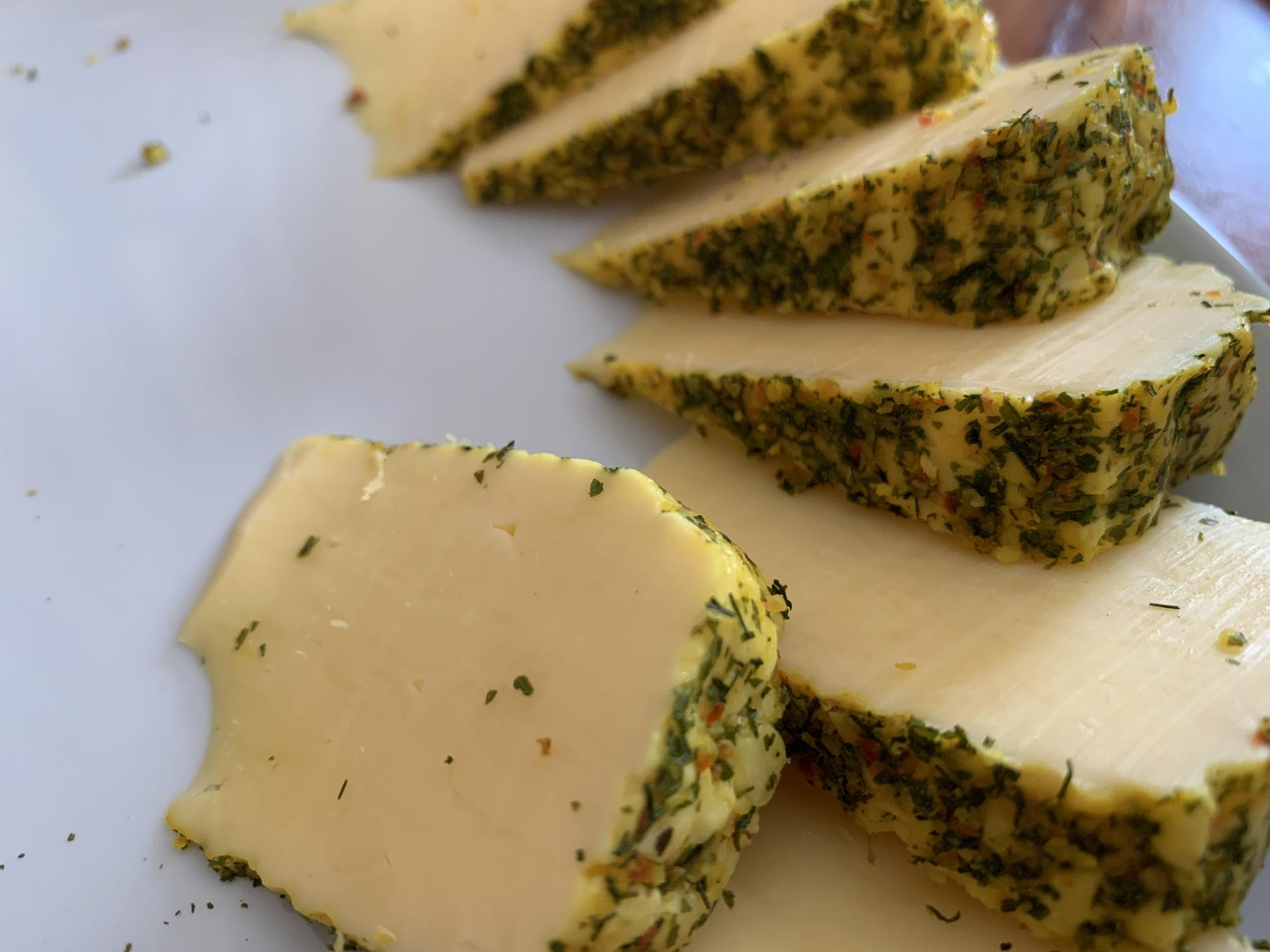
Latvian cheese with herbs

Latvia is much richer in dairy products than other Western countries. Cottage cheese (biezpiens), sour cream (skābais krējums), soured milk (rūgušpiens) and different types of fresh and dried cheeses are available. Kefir, soured milk and other fermented milk beverages are usually consumed alongside hot meals.

Cottage cheese is frequently mixed with sour cream and fresh herbs as a breakfast dish, as well as added to salads and used in cakes and other desserts like the curd snack (biezpiena sieriņš). In 2012, curd snack Kārums was voted the favorite product of Latvian consumers, receiving 20% of votes. For lunch, cottage cheese is traditionally usually eaten with boiled potatoes, lightly salted herring, spring onions and sour cream.

Since the early 20th century a distinct type of butter is made in Rucava, Rucava white butter (Rucavas baltais sviests). It is much leaner than normal butter, with a 40% fat content on average. In 2018 this type of butter received the Protected Designation of Origin classification in the European Union. Hemp butter (kaņepju sviests) is made by finely ground roasted hemp seeds, mixed with butter or hemp oil.

Seeds, nuts, dried fruits, clover or mixtures of dried herbs are often added to cheese. It is also frequently smoked or aged in oil, but fresh cheese is served with garlic or herbs. Jāņi cheese, a fresh sour milk cheese with caraway seeds, is made and served during the Midsummer festival Jāņi and considered a symbol of Latvian culture, and was included in the EU Traditional Specialty Guaranteed register in 2015.

=== Soups ===
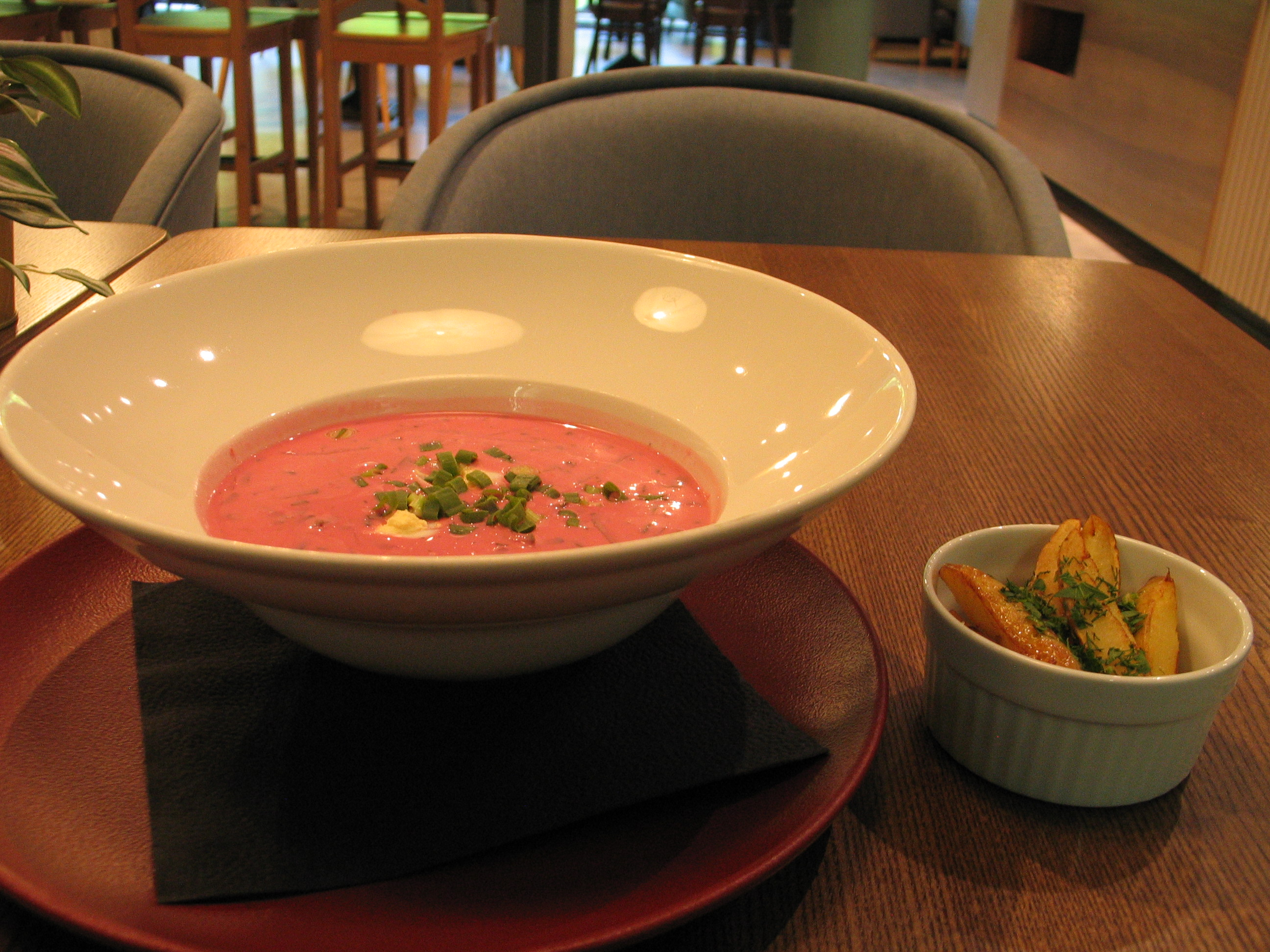
Cold borscht served with fried potatoes

Soups are commonly made with vegetables and broth or kefir. Cold borscht (aukstā zupa), fish soup (zivju zupa), sorrel soup (skābeņu zupa) and mushroom soup (sēņu zupa) are also consumed by Latvians. A traditional Latvian dessert is rye bread soup (maizes zupa) made from rye bread, whipped cream, dried fruit and cranberries.

Cold borscht is usually eaten in the spring and summer and consists of kefir or soured milk, boiled beets, chopped radish, fresh cucumbers, boiled eggs and fresh herbs.

=== Bread ===
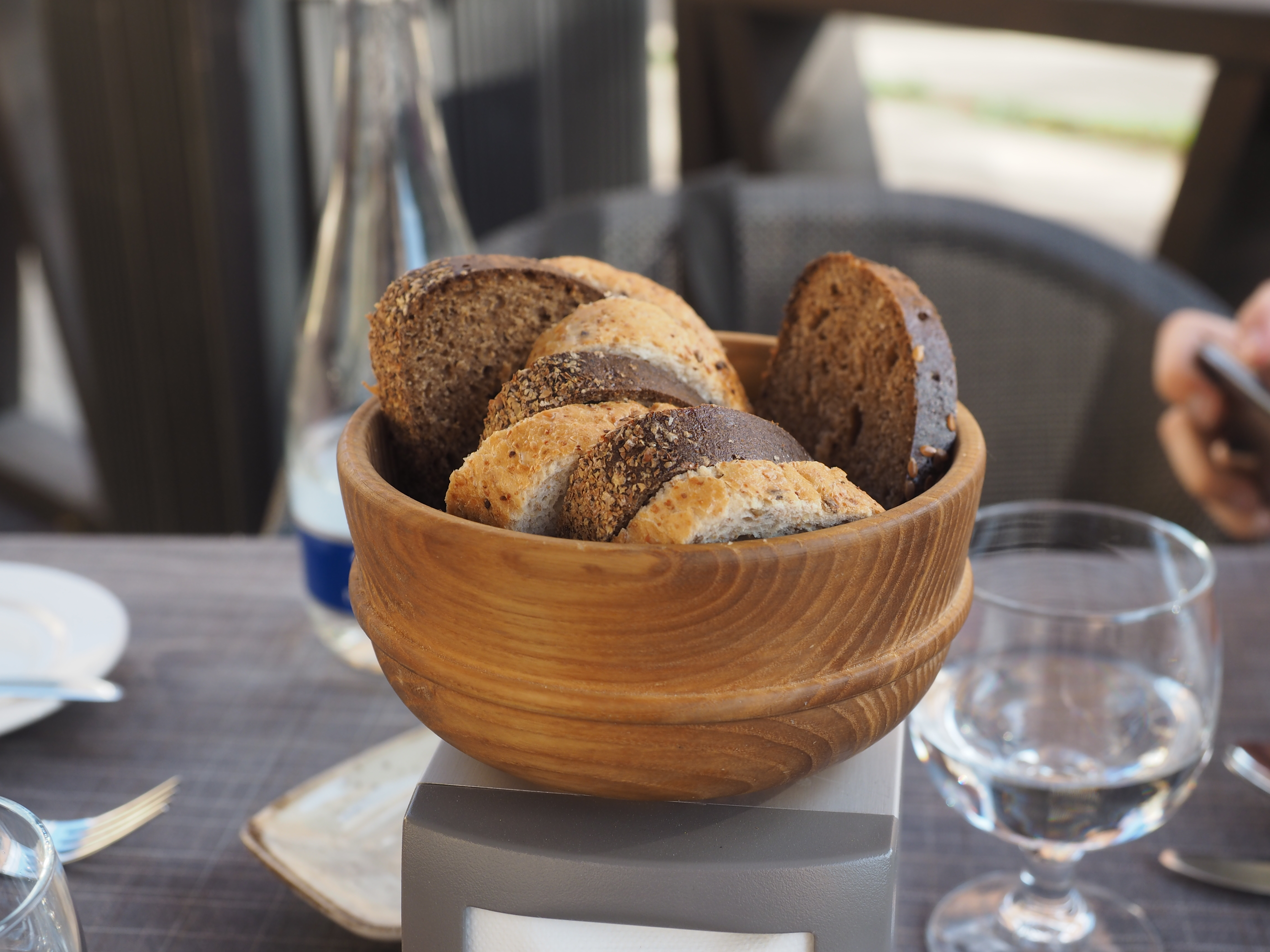
Slices of white bread and rupjmaize at a restaurant in Riga

Rye bread (rudzu maize) has been a national food staple for centuries and is included in the Latvian Culture Canon and the EU Traditional Specialty Guaranteed register. The bread is similar to Russian or German black bread and is made from coarse rye flour, malt and caraway seeds and traditionally baked in a wood-fired oven. Another popular type of bread is sourdough bread (saldskābmaize) made from finely ground rye flour and caraway seeds. Fried rye bread with garlic (ķiploku grauzdiņi) and mayonnaise is often served as a starter in restaurants and bars. Historically white bread (baltmaize) was considered a delicacy and was eaten only on festive occasions.

=== Pastries ===
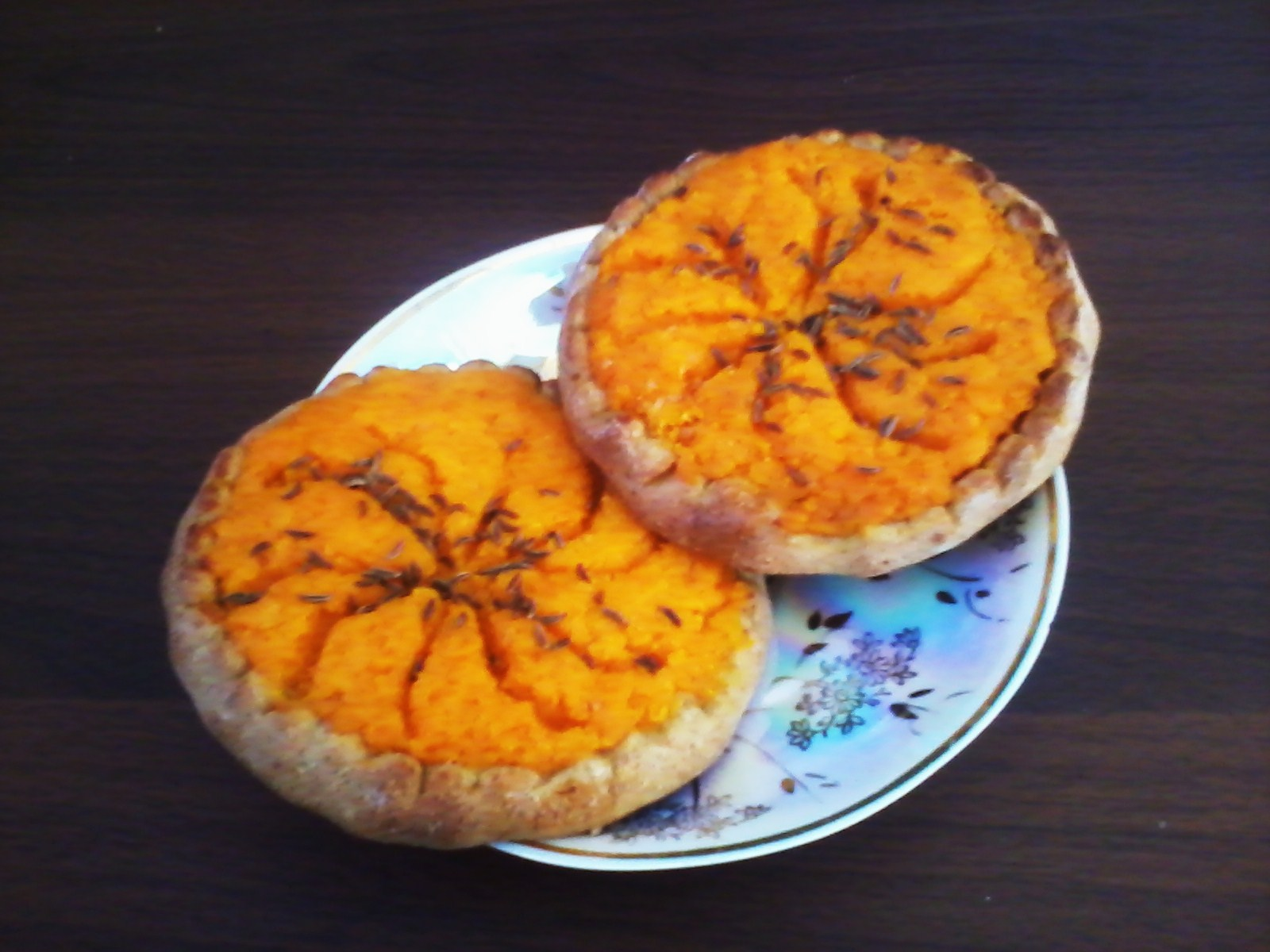
Sklandrausis

A popular pastry is the speķrauši, wheat or rye flour buns filled with finely cut streaky bacon and onions. Sometimes caraway seeds are also added to the dough. Speķrauši are commonly served during the winter solstice Ziemassvētki and summer solstice Jāņi. Kliņģeris, a large sweet pretzel with dried fruits and spices, is usually served as a dessert on special occasions, such as name days and birthdays. Sklandrausis is a traditional dish in Latvian cuisine which has a Livonian origin; it is a sweet pie, made of rye dough and filled with mashed potatoes and carrots and seasoned with caraway. In 2013, sklandrausis received a "Traditional Speciality Guaranteed" designation from the European Commission. Potato pancakes with smoked salmon and sour cream are also very popular.

=== Drinks ===
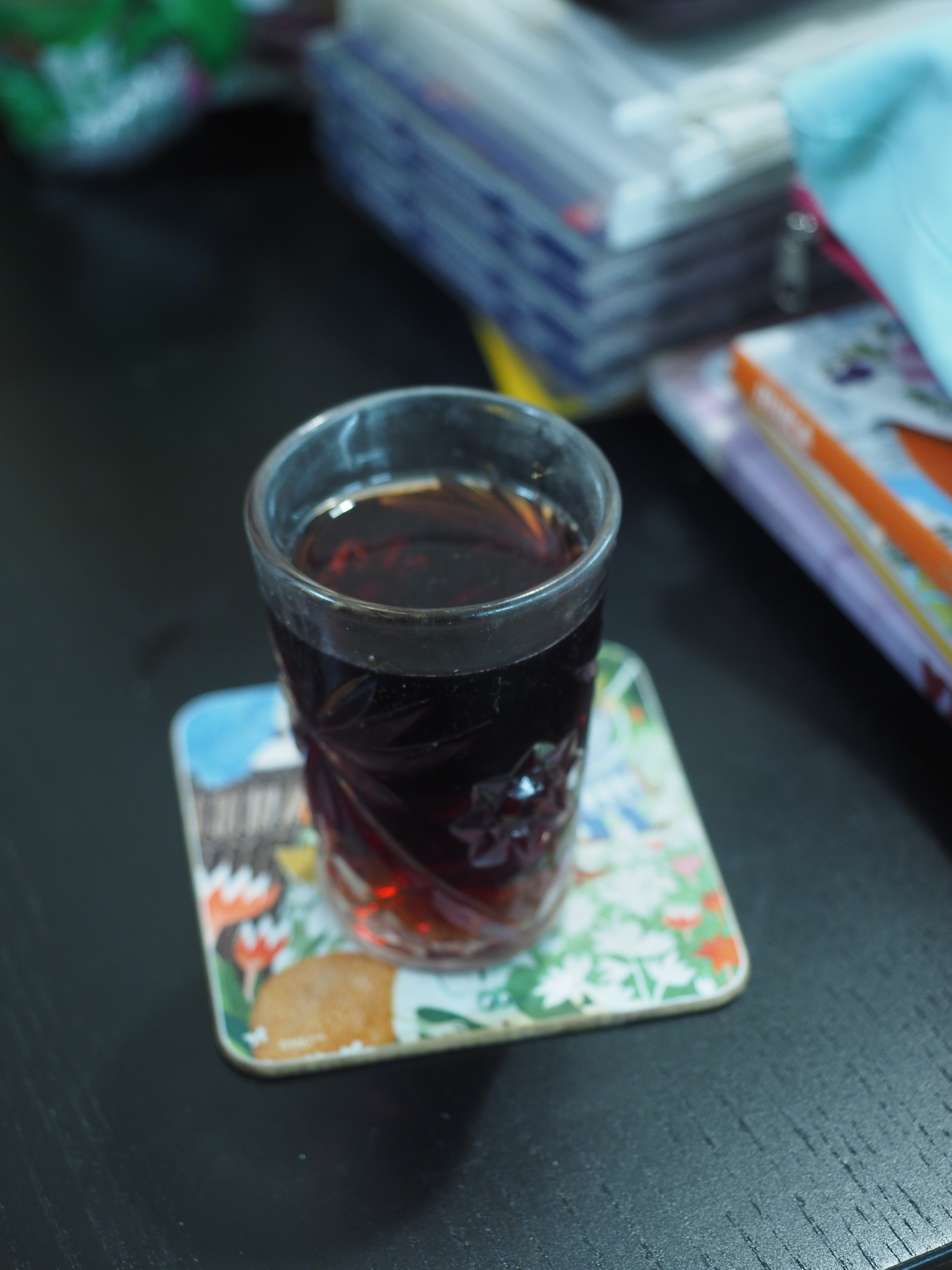
A shot of Riga Black Balsam

Ancient Latvians brewed beer (alus), mead (miestiņš) and honey beer (medalus) before the 13th century, both celebratory occasions and everyday use. After the Baltic Crusades, the local beer brewing was influenced by the incoming Western European techniques. For example, prior to that, many herbs were used, but they were replaced by hops as a preservative and flavoring agent. A craft brewery drawing upon the ancient brewing traditions is Labietis that uses a wide variety of herbs, flowers, berries, and spices in their brews.

A very popular drink in spring is fresh birch sap. Traditionally, it was preserved by adding raisins, lemon rind, and blackcurrant twigs. Every spring, birch sap is sold in markets and roadside stalls, but it can also be seen in more refined products, such as birch sap lemonade, still and sparkling wine, mulled wine and birch sap schnapps.

Kvass, traditionally brewed from fermented rye or black bread, has also remained popular in Latvia. In the Latvian SSR, kvass was sold by street vendors from carts with big yellow canisters, while nowadays mass-produced kvass can be bought at supermarkets.

With the development of cold-hardy grape varieties more suitable for the northern climate, winemaking has become more common in Latvia. In addition to that, raspberry, black currant, and other fruit wines are also being made, as well as ciders. Wine Hill of Sabile used to be registered in the Guinness Book of Records as the most northern open-air vineyard in the world. Since 1999 the town also hosts an annual wine festival.

=== Mushrooms ===
Latvia has ancient traditions involving edible mushrooms. Wild mushroom foraging is very popular in summer and autumn. Modern, as well as traditional mushroom preparation, is very popular. There are around 4,100 known mushroom species in Latvia, 1,100 of those are cup mushrooms. About ¼ of these are edible. The most popular edible ones are various Boletus and Cantharellus. A traditional mushroom sauce is made from wild mushrooms, onions, garlic, sweet or sour cream and sometimes bacon. It is usually eaten alongside boiled potatoes and brined cucumbers.

== Gallery ==
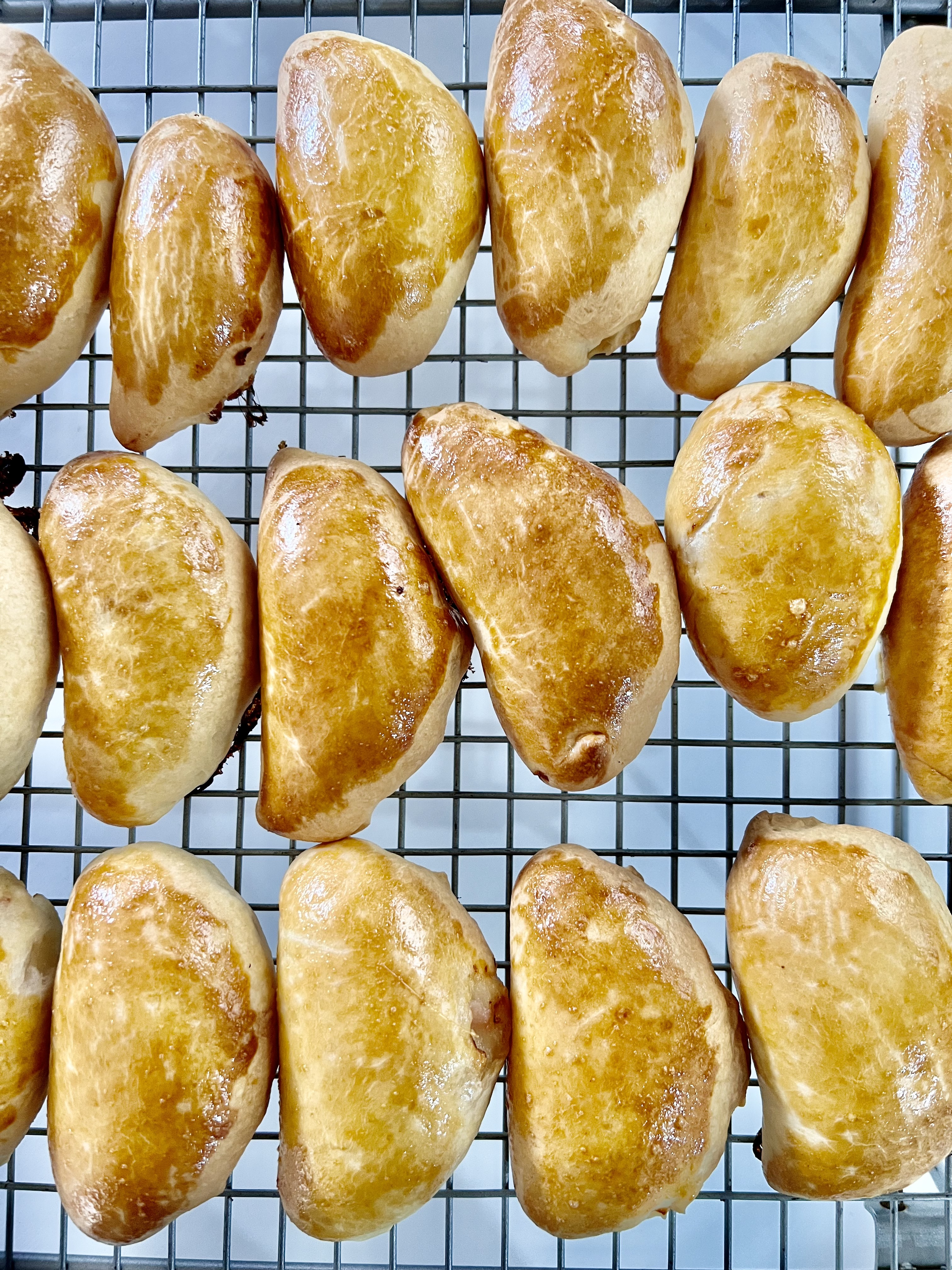
Speķrauši

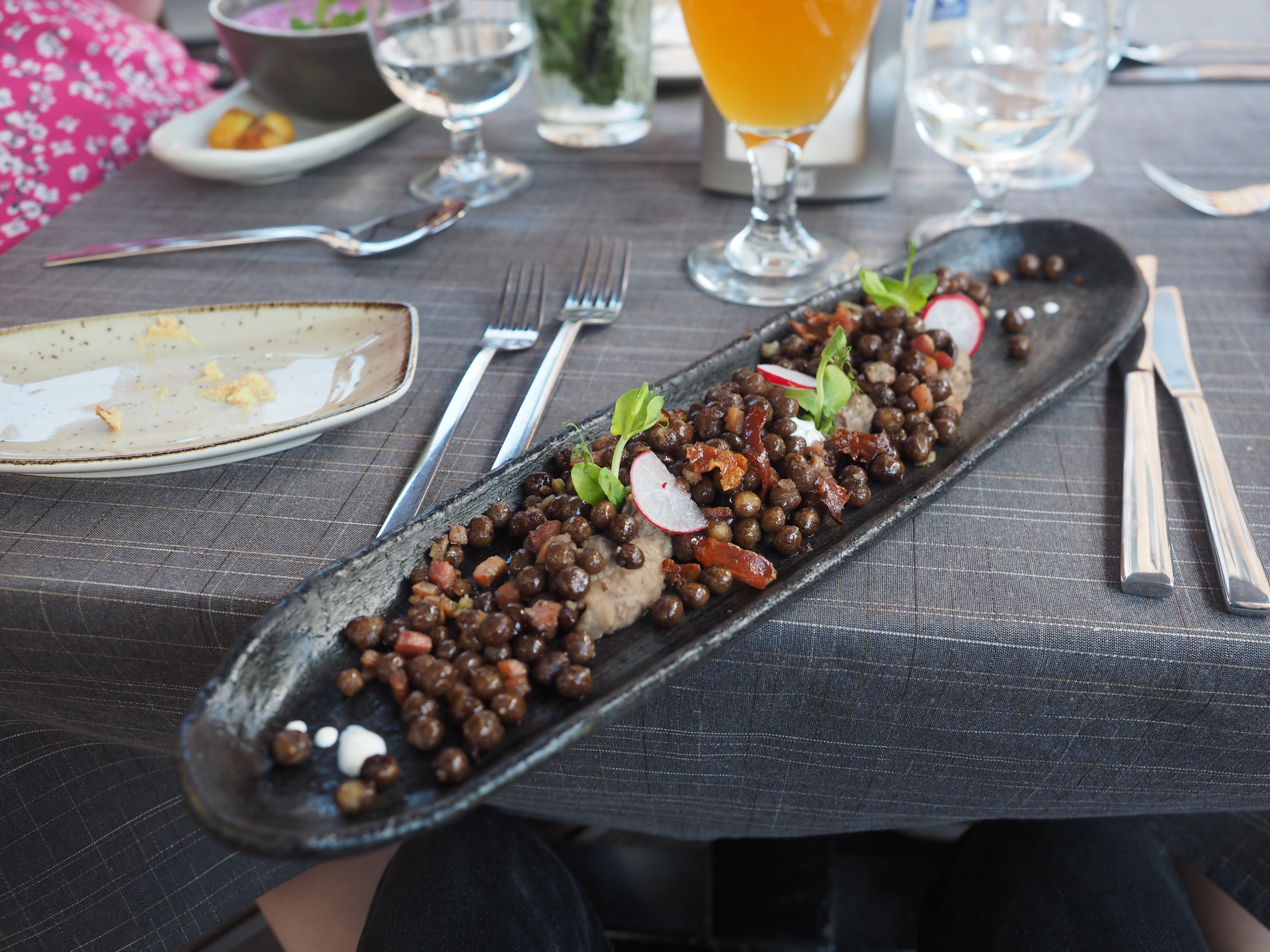
Grey peas with fried speck and radish

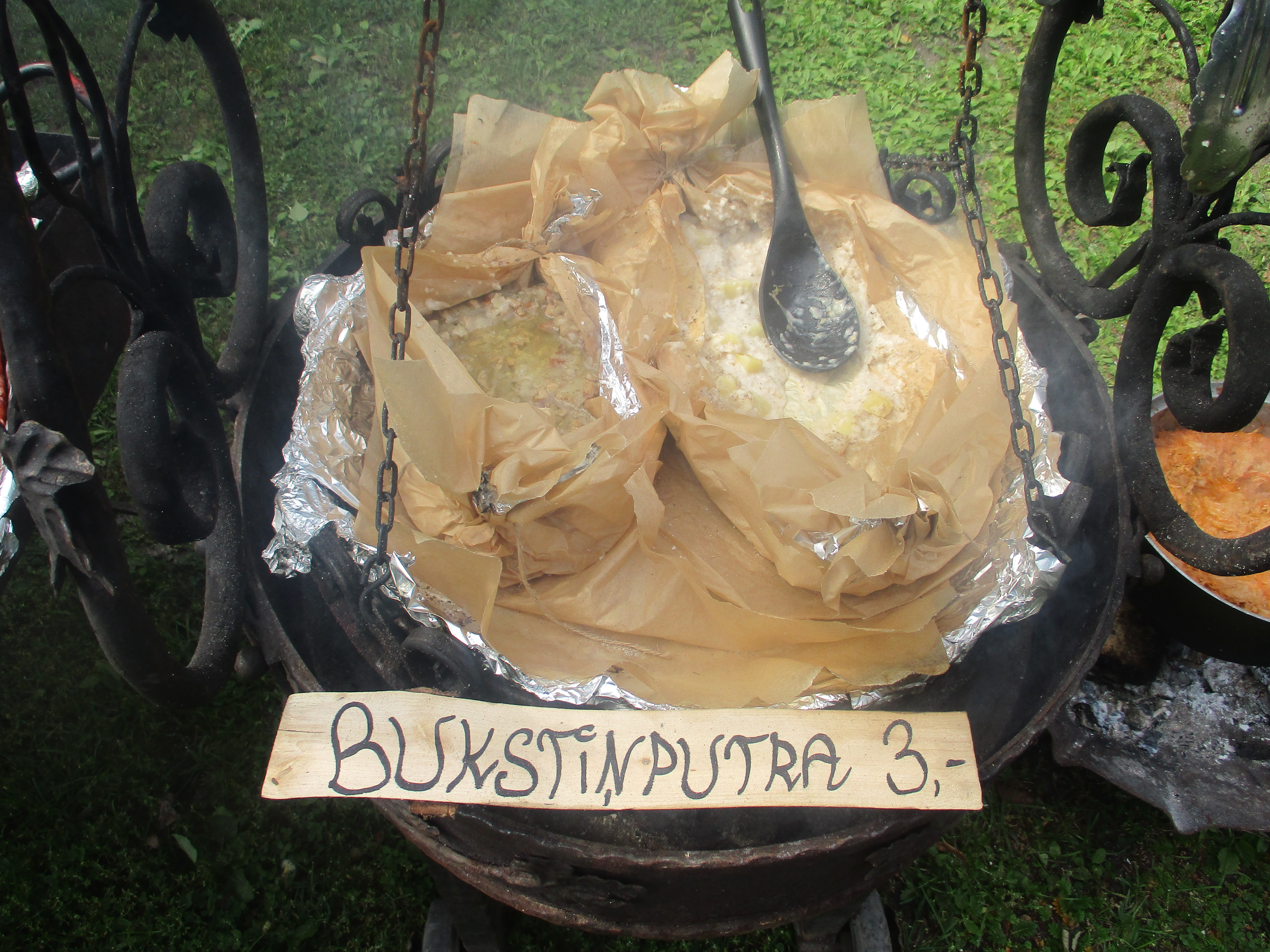
Barley grit porridge with milk, potatoes and speck (bukstiņputra)

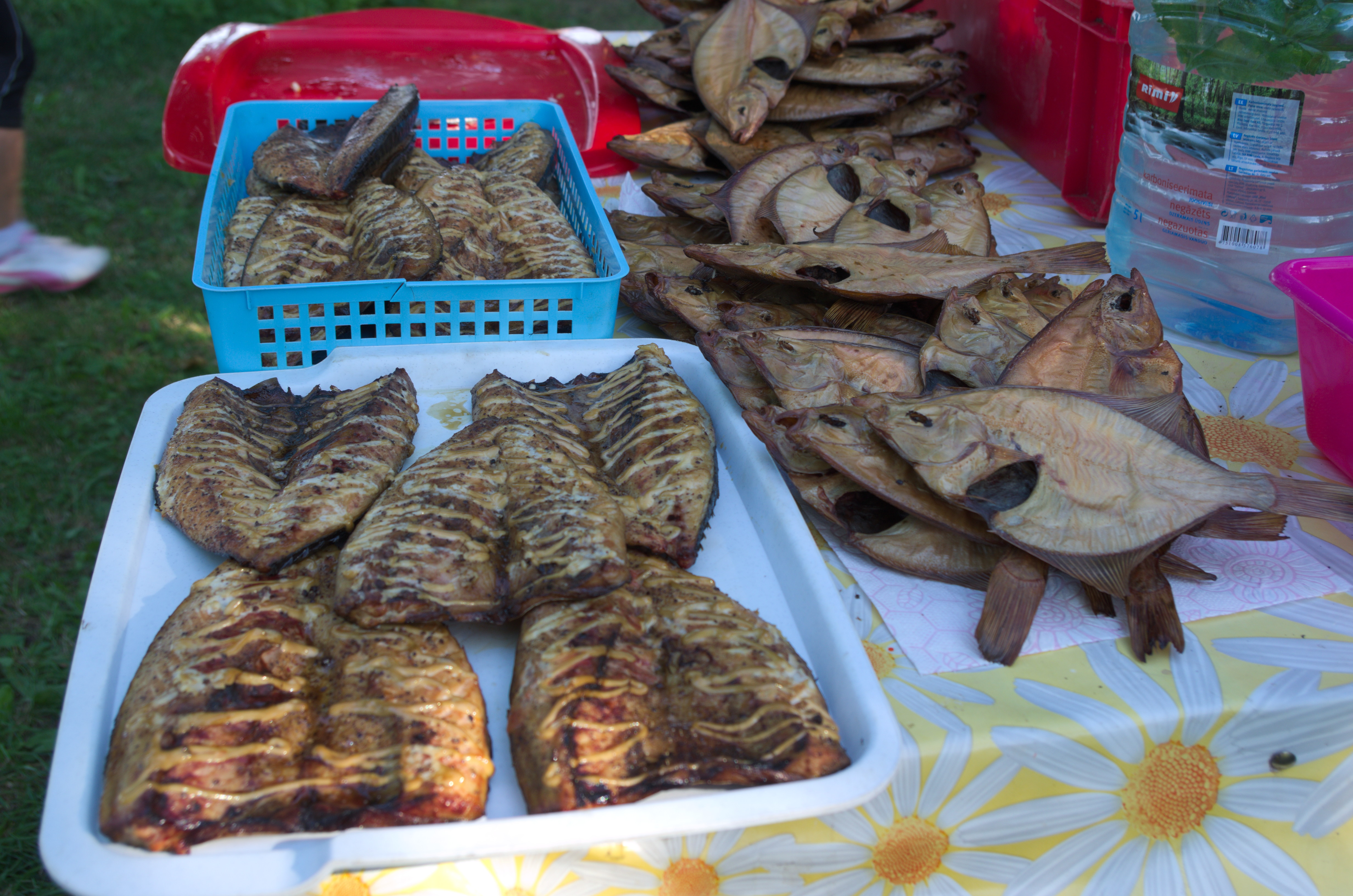
Hot smoked mackerels and European plaices

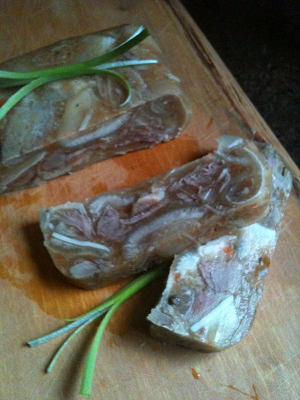
Head cheese (galerts)

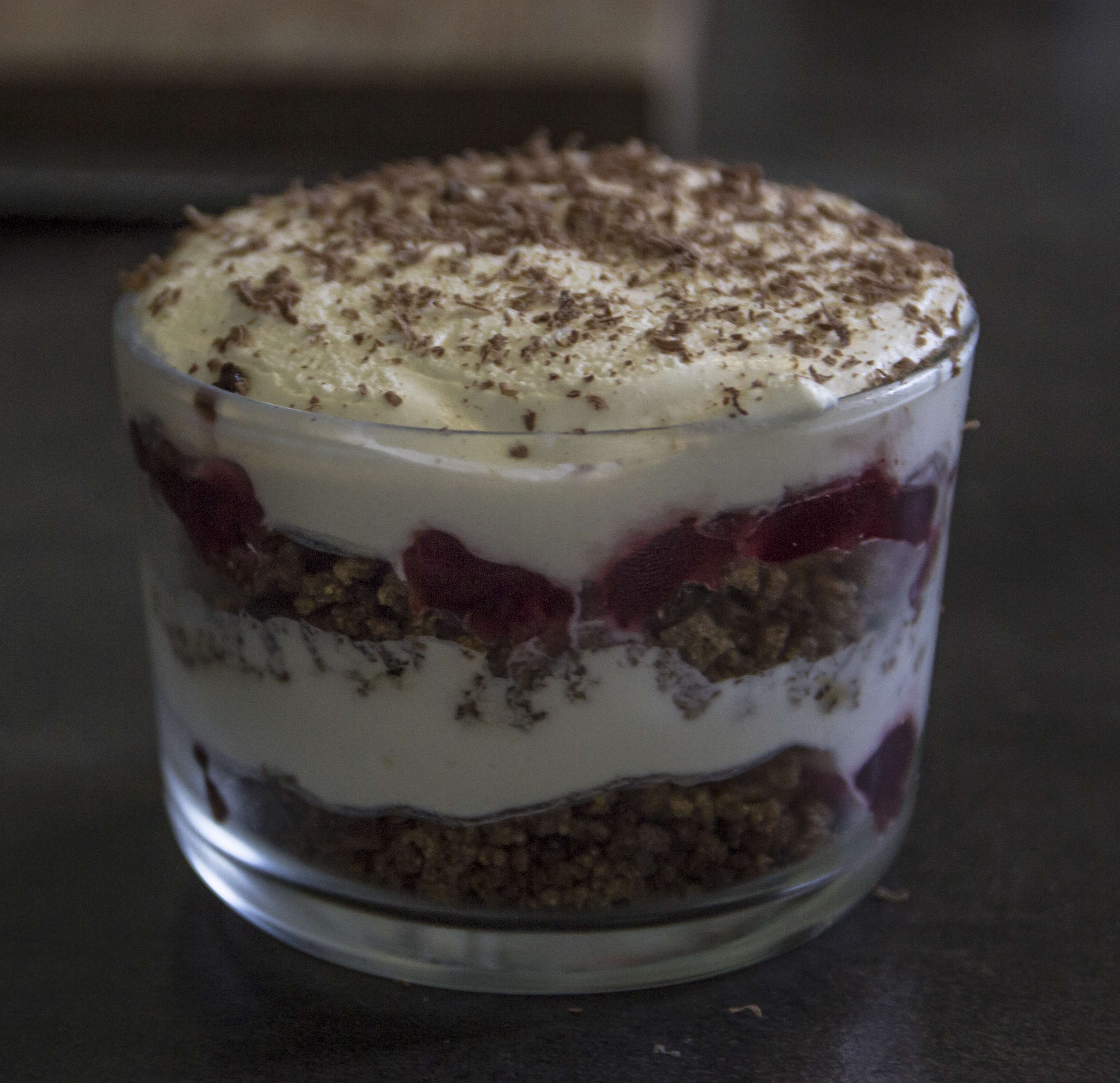
Layered rye bread (rupjmaizes kārtojums)

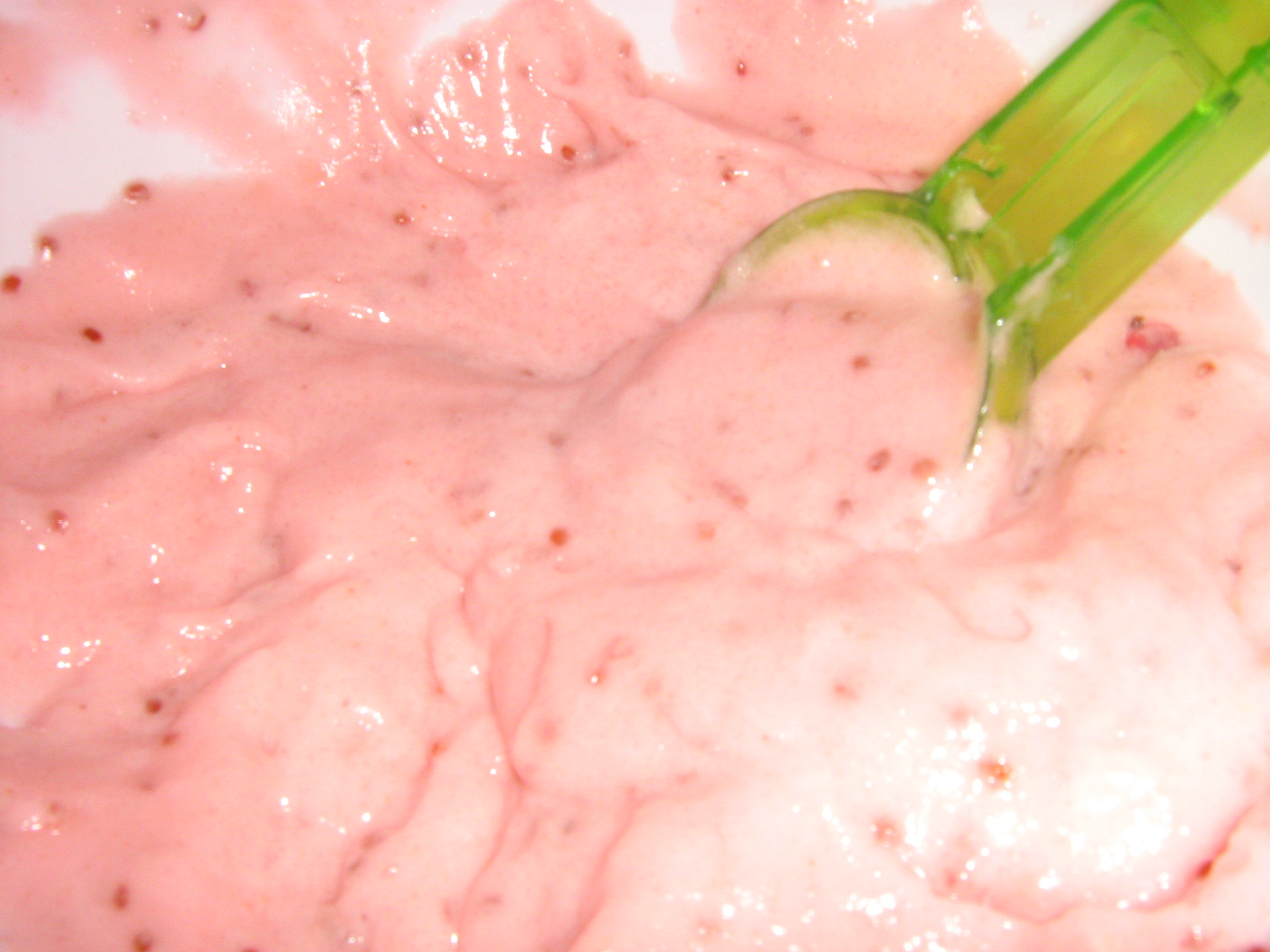
Redcurrant semolina mousse (jāņogu debesmanna)

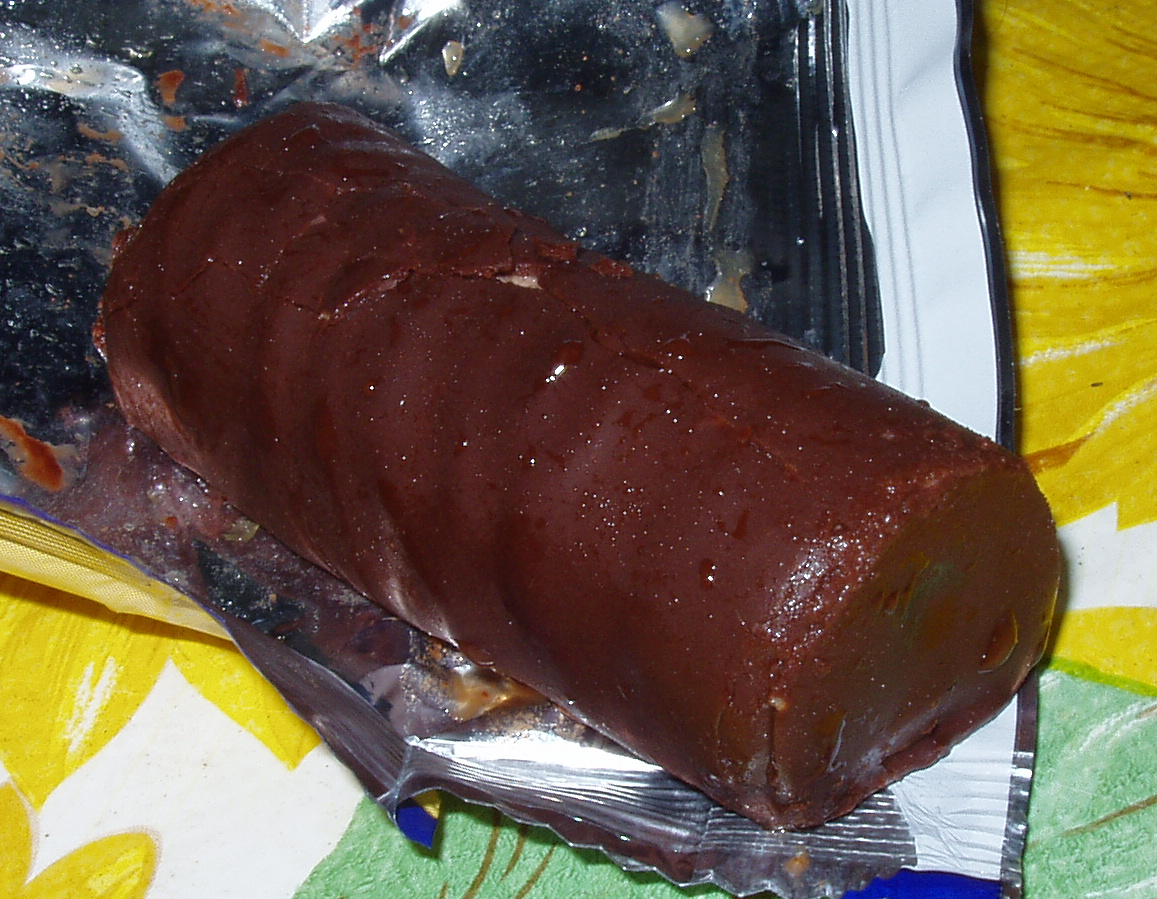
Curd snack (biezpiena sieriņš)

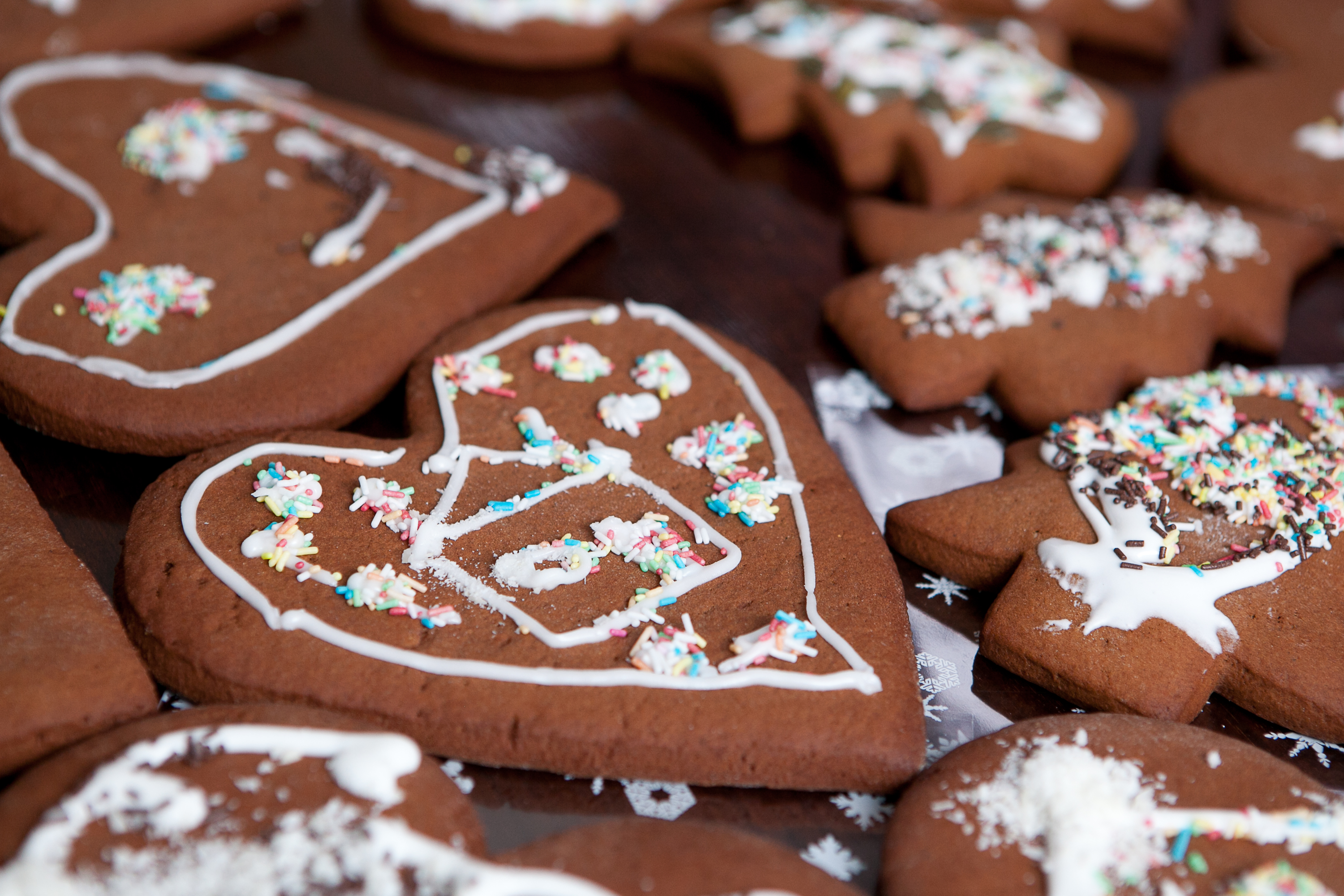
Gingerbreads from Latvia

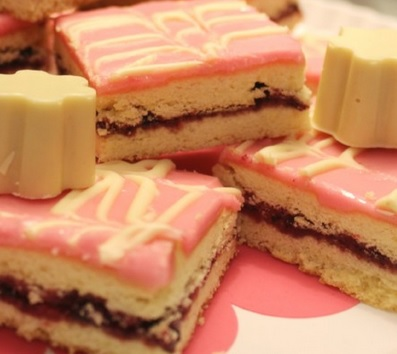
Alexandertorte

== See also ==
- Latvian pottery
