= Speķrauši =

Latvian pastry

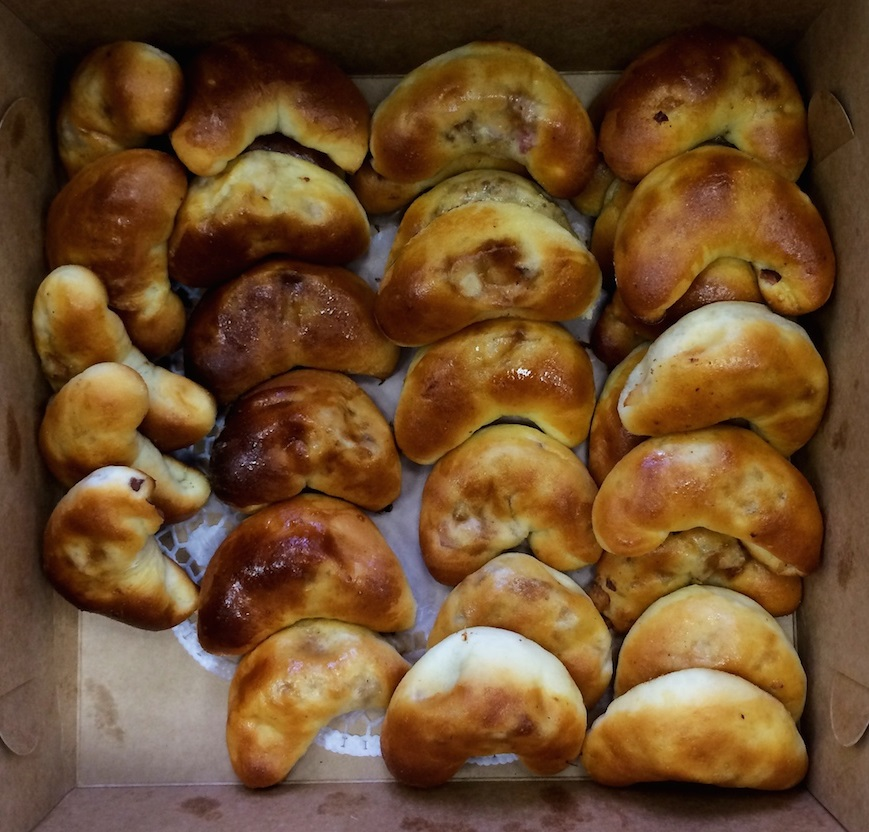
- A box of speķrauši
- Alternative names: speķa rauši, speķa pīrāgi, speķa pīrādziņi, pīrāgi, pīrādziņi
- Type: Pastry
- Course: Snack, main
- Place of origin: Latvia
- Main ingredients: Dough, onions, bacon
- Similar dishes: Pirozhki, samsa

Speķrauši or speķa pīrādziņi, sometimes also colloquially known simply as pīrāgi or pīrādziņi, are Latvian oblong or crescent-shaped baked bread rolls or pastries filled with finely chopped fatty bacon cubes and onions. They range from five to thirteen centimetres (2.0 to 5.1 in) in length, depending on if they are intended as a snack or a more substantial meal. Smaller speķrauši are often prized for their daintiness and are considered the work of a skilled cook.

As with many national dishes, Latvian families often have their own unique recipe for the dish, yet to be called speķrauši it has to maintain the crescent shape and the filling has to be bacon bits. Due to the amount of work involved to make them, they're usually made only for special occasions and in very large numbers. Yet, one would be able to find them in most local bakeries and pastry shops.

== Variations ==
Other common fillings include fatty bacon, fatback (speķis), mixtures of ground or finely chopped meats (ground beef, ham and chicken with or without bacon), fish, cabbage, pressed cottage cheese, stewed cabbage or sauerkraut. Bacon pies come in two main varieties: plain bread bacon pies and broth or soup bacon pies (zupas or buljona pīrāgi). Bread bacon pies come with a larger variety of fillings and are made using a yeast dough. Broth bacon pies are made from a flaky pastry butter dough, often a sour cream dough, and are usually filled with boiled beef or sometimes cooked fish. These are intended to be eaten with a cup or bowl of broth.

== Preparation ==
The day before baking bacon patties, the cook usually spends one or two hours preparing any meat and onion that will be used. Bacon and other fatty meats (such as bacon or back bacon) do not chop well in a food processor and tend to get caught on the blade, so the cook must hand chop these into tiny cubes, about 1.5 millimetres (about 1/16 inches). This is sometimes made easier by freezing the meat for a few minutes. Other less fatty meats (such as beef) tend to turn into a paste in the food processor, so if the meat is not already ground, the cook grinds it using a hand or electric grinder.

The day of baking, the cook makes the dough. This is a fairly standard white bread dough, with a varying amount of fat in it, depending on the particular family's recipe. Allowing the dough to proof and rise takes several hours, during which time the meat from the previous day is sauteed over a very low flame for a few minutes to ensure that the flavours in the filling meld a bit. When the dough has finished rising for bread bacon patties, or the dough has chilled for bullion bacon patties, the cook usually uses one of two methods to make the individual bacon patties:

1. The cook takes a few cups of dough and rolls out the whole lump using a rolling pin, or just the edge of the lump using a glass. The cook takes a tablespoon of filling and places it on the dough about 3 centimetres (about 1.5 inches) from one of the edges. The cook folds the edge of the dough over the filling, puts a glass over the dough and filling pile and cuts through both layers of dough on one side with the glass so that a half-moon-shaped pastry is created. The pressure from the glass cutting through the dough pinches the two dough layers together on the one open side. The pastry is re-shaped slightly to form an oblong or crescent shape.
2. The cook takes a walnut-sized lump of dough and flattens it with a rolling pin or with fingers into a round dough disk. The cook then places a tablespoon of filling into the middle of the dough disk and folds two sides together to make a half-moon shape, pinching the two sides together. The resulting edges are then folded under and re-shaped to make a more oblong or crescent shape.

Prepared pastries are put into rows on pans, left to rise slightly, brushed with egg and then baked for a few minutes.

== History and folklore ==
Pīrāgi were not a seasonal dish in Latvian society, because most ingredients needed to make the different varieties were available from the pantry year round. After potatoes had filtered into Latvian society from the New World, sometimes potatoes were also used to replace flour in the dough, allowing the pastries to be baked even when flour was unavailable. This means that pīrāgi could be baked at any time and are historically associated with Latvian celebrations year-round.

The two biggest historic Latvian celebrations are for summer solstice and winter solstice: Jāņi and Ziemassvētki. One of the most popular and familiar Latvian Ziemassvētki folk songs mentions pīrāgi:

Ziemassvētki sabraukuši
Rakstītām kamanām
Pīrāgam nabagam
Abi gali apdeguši

Christmas arrived
In a decorated sleigh
Oh that poor bacon pie
Both ends were burnt

== See also ==
- Pirozhki
- Samsa
