= Jāņi cheese =

Type of cheese

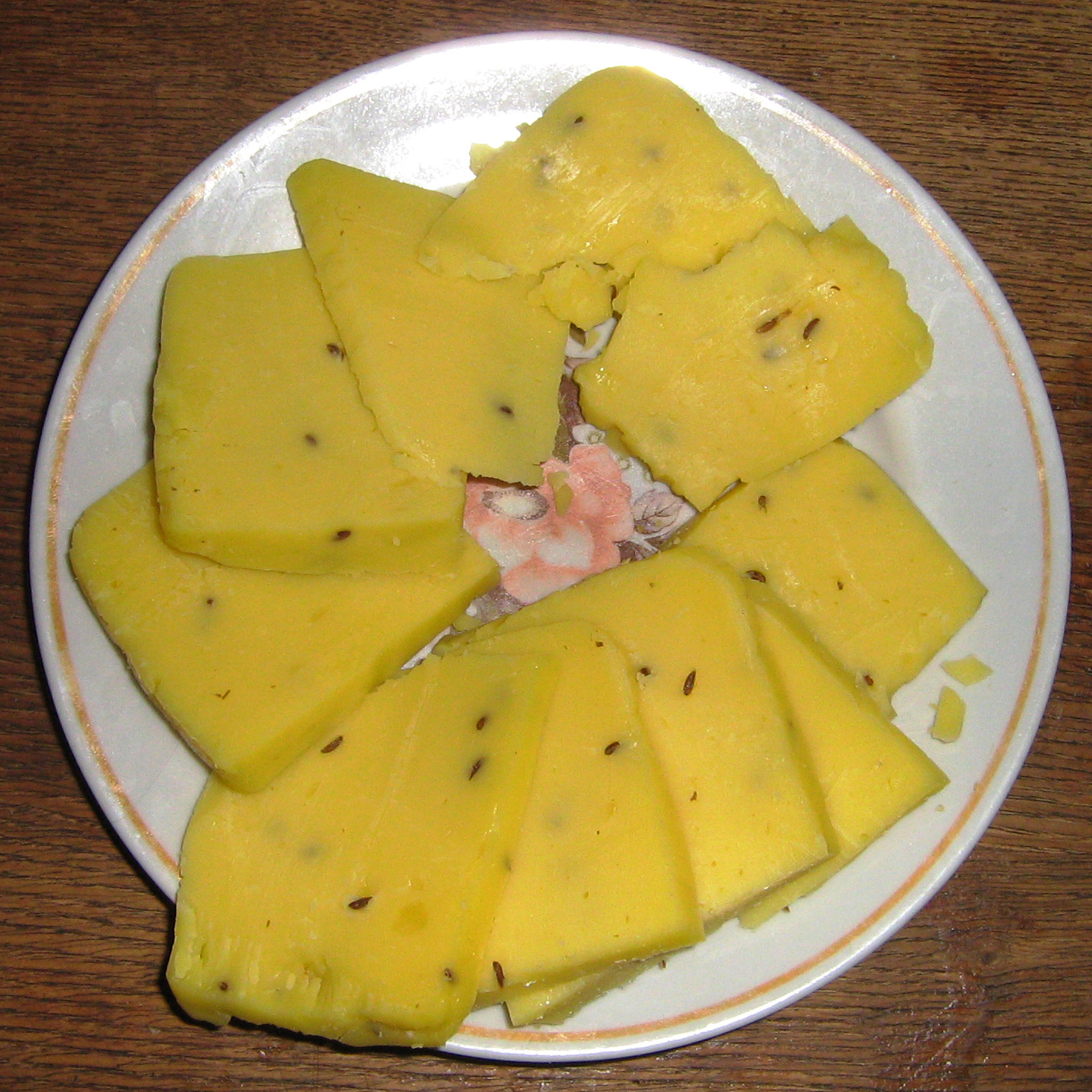
- Slices of Jāņi cheese
- Other names: Caraway cheese (ķimeņu siers)
- Country of origin: Latvia
- Source of milk: cows
- Texture: soft, compact, slightly grainy and homogeneous throughout
- Fat content: <30%
- Dimensions: cylinder 4–6 cm in height and 8–30 cm in diameter
- Aging time: at least 1–2 hours
- Certification: TSG 2015
- Named after: Jāņi

Jāņi cheese (Latvian: Jāņu siers) is a Latvian sour milk cheese, traditionally eaten on Jāņi, the Latvian celebration of the summer solstice. Nowadays the cheese has become one of the symbols of Latvian culture.

== Production ==
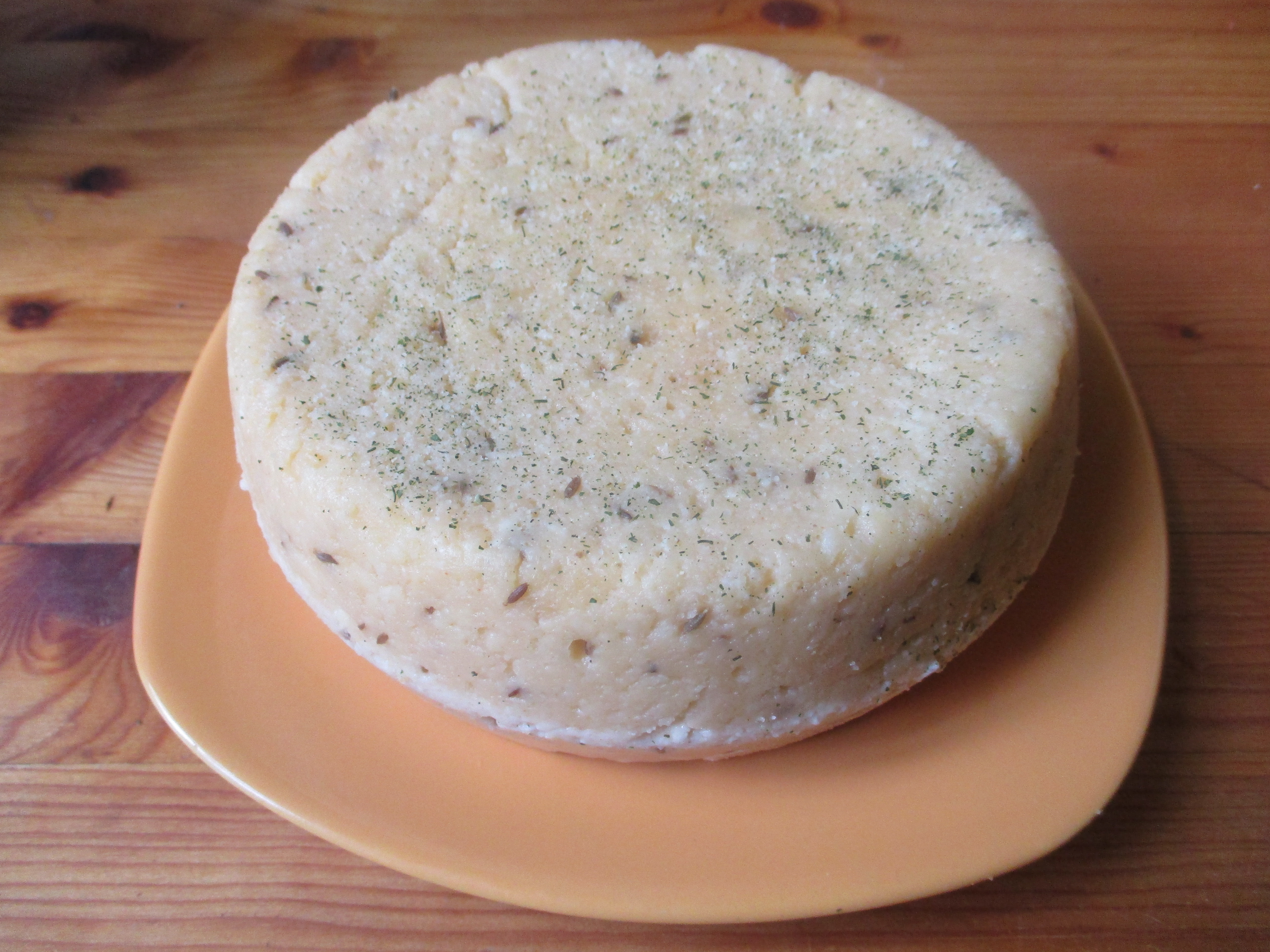
A wheel of home-made Jāņi cheese

The basic ingredients of the dish are curd produced from both soured milk and fresh milk. Traditionally, caraway seeds, salt and eggs are added during cooking, as well as butter or cream if wishing to increase fat content. The cheese is made by heating whole milk, adding curd, and then cooking the mixture until fluffy curds separate from a clear whey. The whey is discarded when the cheese mass reaches a temperature of 72–77 °C (162–171 °F). At this point, the curds are placed into a skillet or cooking pan, and a mixture of egg, butter, salt, and caraway seeds is stirred into it. Once a solid and firm ball is formed, the cheese is placed in a cheesecloth to drain and often pressed by placing weight on it. Generally, the cheese is prepared a few days before eating and is allowed to ripen in a cool place before consumption.

== Consumption ==
Although Jāņi cheese experienced declining popularity during the COVID-19 pandemic, with consumers opting out for other types of cheeses, such as mozzarella, feta, as well as hard cheese, and aged cheeses, its production has increased in recent years, rising from 132.2 tonnes in 2022 to 141.4 tonnes in 2023, 140.4 tonnes in 2024, and 179.9 tonnes in 2025. Despite challenges from rising production costs and labour shortages, partly due to its traditionally seasonal production, Jāņi cheese has increasingly expanded beyond its association with Jāņi and become available throughout the year.

== Certification ==
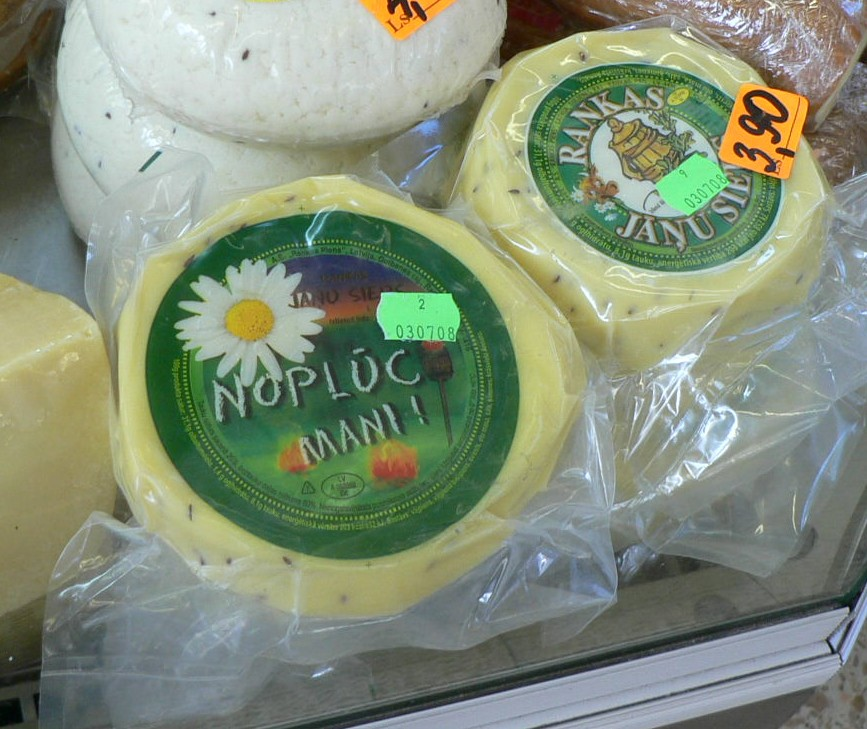
Wheels of Jāņi cheese manufactured by "Rankas piens"

On November 16, 2015, Jāņi cheese was included in the EU Traditional Speciality Guaranteed (TSG) register under the name Jāņu siers. Currently 5 manufacturers ("Valmieras piens", "Rankas piens", "Lazdonas piensaimnieks", "Straupe", and "Dundaga") fulfil the TSG criteria and can label their product as Jāņu siers.
