= Sklandrausis =

Traditional Latvian dish

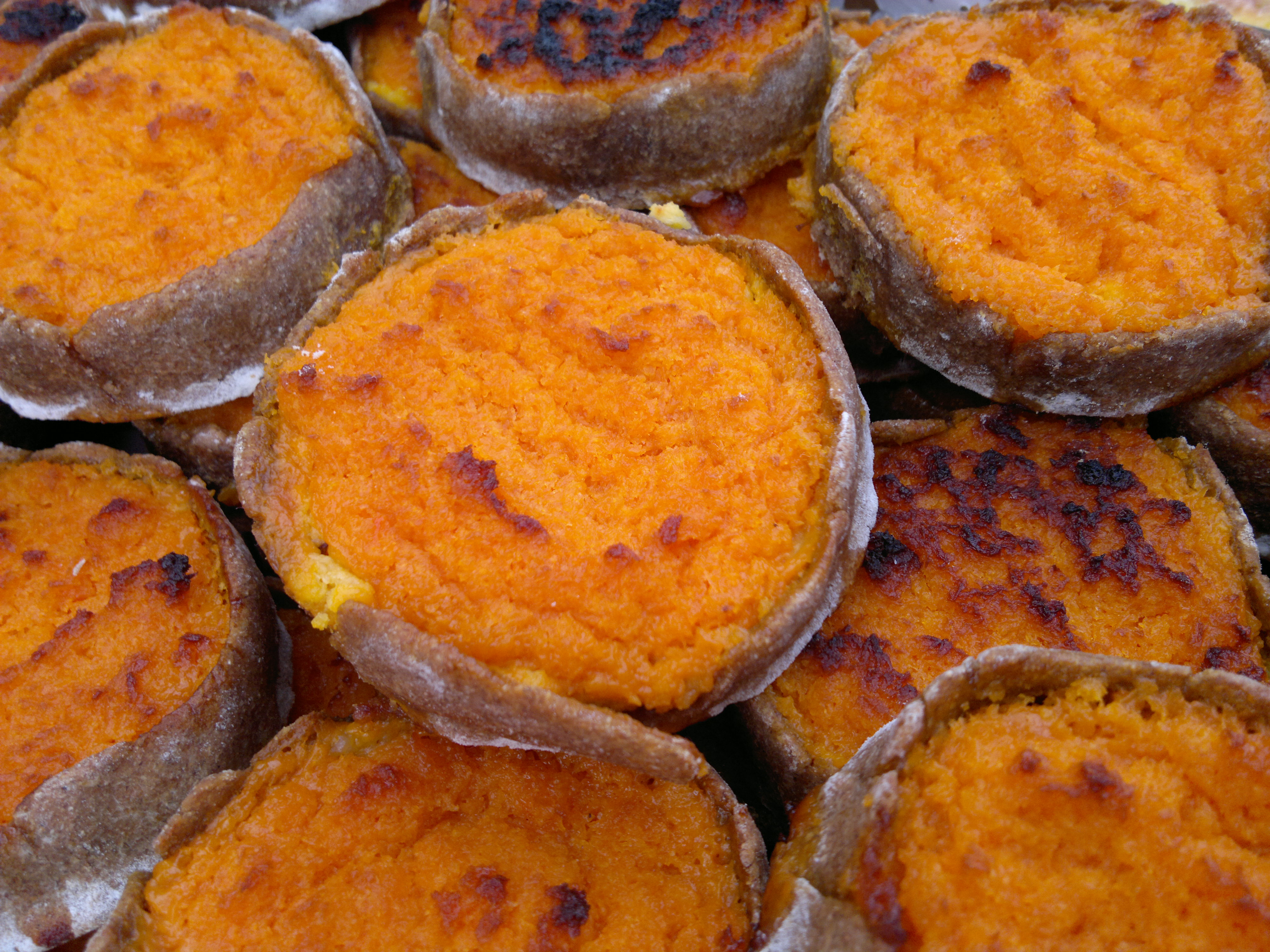
- Alternative names: žograusis, dižrausis
- Type: Pie
- Place of origin: Latvia
- Region or state: Courland
- Associated cuisine: Latvian and Livonian cuisine
- Invented: 16–17th century
- Main ingredients: Rye dough, potato and carrot paste, caraway
- Food energy (per serving): 339 kcal (1,420 kJ)
Nutritional value
(per serving)
- Protein: 9 g
- Fat: 11 g
- Carbohydrate: 55 g
- Similar dishes: Karjalanpiirakka, Perepechi

Sklandrausis (pl.: sklandrauši; Livonian dialect: sklandrouš, from Curonian: sklanda – 'fence-post, wattle fence, slope, declivity'; Livonian: sūrkak, pl.: sūr kakūd), žograusis (pl.: žograuši) or dižrausis (pl.: dižrauši) is a traditional Latvian dish of Livonian origin. It is a sweet pie, made of rye dough and filled with potato and carrot paste and caraway.

In 2013, European Commission designated sklandrausis with a Traditional speciality guaranteed status. A festival dedicated to sklandrauši has been organized in Dundaga, Talsi Municipality since 2013.

== Ingredients ==
The dough of sklandrausis is made from rye flour, butter, and water. The potato filling consists of potatoes, sour cream, egg, butter, and salt. The carrot filling consists of carrots, butter, sour cream, egg, and sugar.

== Preparation ==
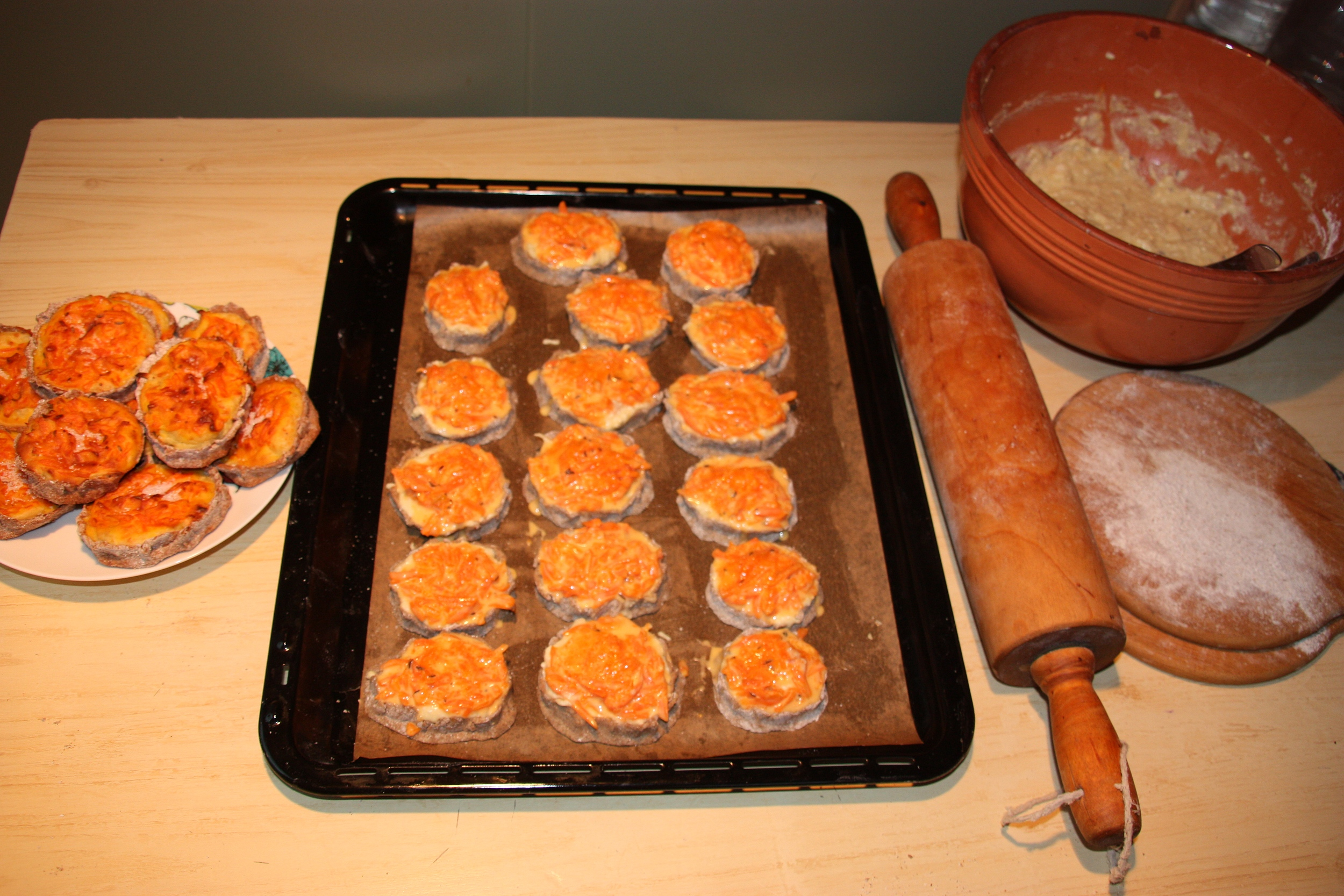
Preparation of sklandrauši

Traditionally, the dough is cut in 10–20 centimetres (3.9–7.9 in) rounds, then the edges of the dough are turned up. The dough is filled with a thin layer of potato filling, topped with a thicker layer of carrot filling, then baked. Sklandrausis is served with milk and honey or with skābputra (a fermented milk-and-barley gruel).

== Reception ==
In 2023, sklandrausis was ranked the 5th worst rated dish on the website TasteAtlas after dishes such as hákarl, Yerushalmi Kugel, and kalvsylta, making waves in the Latvian media.

== See also ==
- Karjalanpiirakka
