= Livonian cuisine =

Culinary tradition of the Livonian people

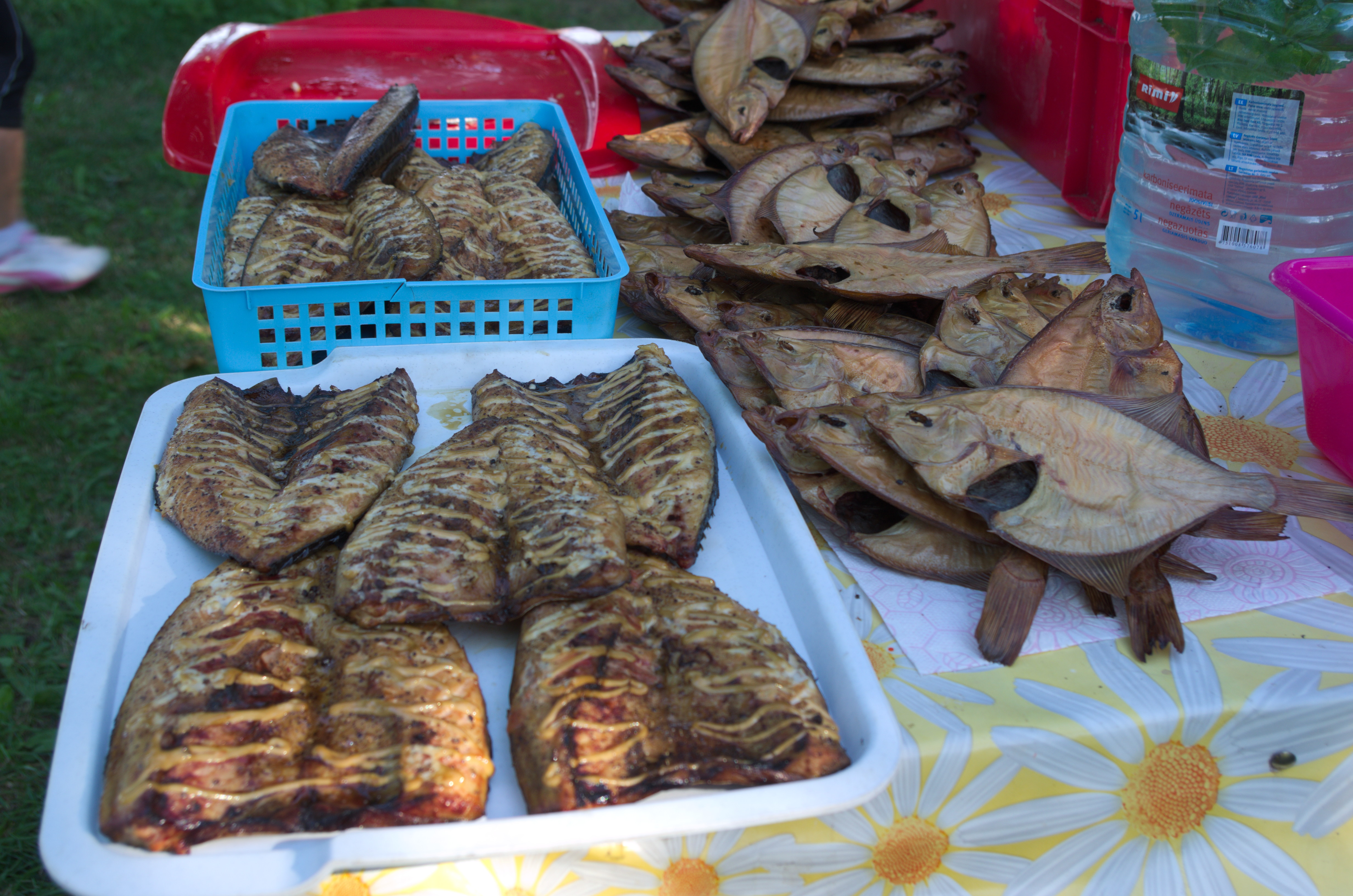
Hot smoked Atlantic mackerels (left) at Roja Beach

Livonian cuisine (in Livonian livõd kek) consists of the cuisine of Livonia and the Livonians, and is characterized by the rich use of locally available foods: Livonians are a coastal people – since they acquire the bulk of their food from the sea, Livonian families have historically eaten a great deal of fish, including European flounder (Livonian: liestād), herring (ēriņ), salted herring, and cod (tūrska).

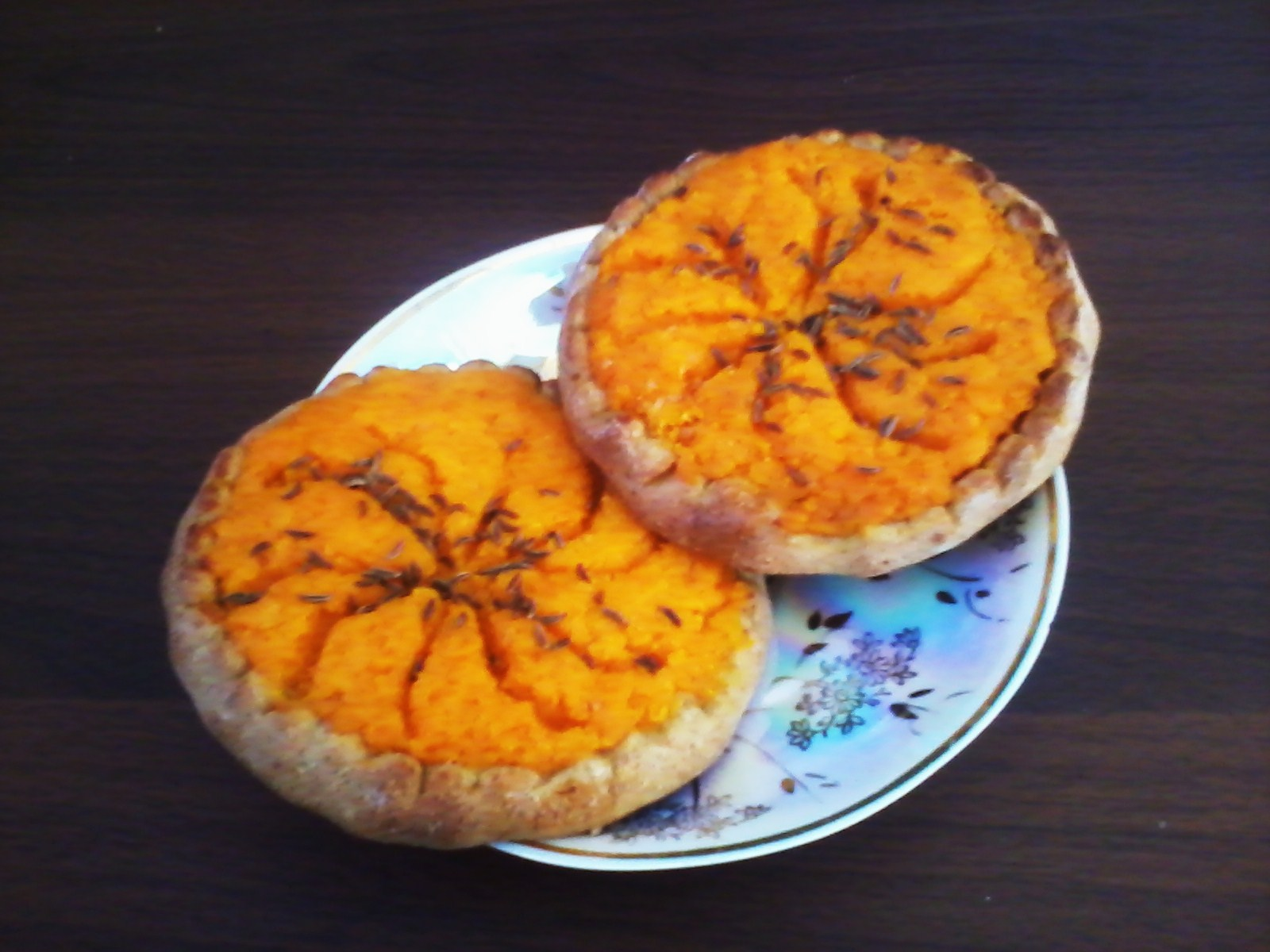
Sklandrausis

In recent years, various projects have been launched to publicise Livonian cuisine (and culture).

== Specialities ==
=== Fish dishes ===
Livonian cuisine essentially consists of dishes made with local seafood: fish, especially the European flounder (in the Courland dialect plekst; in Livonian liestād) and herring (strimal; sīlkõd), are cooked, fried, salted, dried and smoked. The land of the Livonian Coast is not very fertile; for this reason, this population was and is not much devoted to agriculture: in the 20th century, bread, flour, potatoes and other foodstuffs based on cereals were sold or bartered in exchange for fish.

=== Bread, flour and cereal dishes ===
Because of the limited arable area and the general infertility of the land, the Livonians usually baked bread only on Saturdays, and it had to last for the entire week. In most cases it was black bread (rupmaiz; riggi lēba): white bread was even rarer and was eaten only on special festive occasions. Flour (initially barley flour, but later also rye flour and wheat flour), seal oil or fish, and sometimes grated potatoes, porridge made with carrots or grated carrots are used to prepare a dish similar to a pancake (plädīņ) baked in an oven.

Boiled, dried and ground cereals, together with curdled or fresh milk and jam, are used to prepare a varenye eaten at lunch (kamārok; pūtiļ): a mixture obtained from beaten eggs and milk combined with flour produces a cream that is sweetened or preserved as a savoury dish depending on the occasion (drupšiņzup; drupšiņrok). The different versions are known as:

- Kunkliņupu; kunkļmūoz
- Ķiļķēnzup
- Končiņzup
- Rīvķiļķēn; Rīvkukīļd

Rye dough can then be further processed to make sklandrausis (sklandrouš; sūr kakūd).

=== Meat dishes ===
The Livonians raised very few head of livestock, which is why there was little meat and few dairy products in local cuisine. Those who owned animals would fatten pigs in autumn until Christmas: most of the meat obtained was then salted or dried for winter. Small quantities of sausage were prepared after slaughter; the remaining fat (tauk; razā) and tripe (drādž; spradžād) were eaten with bread. During the fattening period, pieces of sliced pork belly and garlic known as sūrmõdmȭka were eaten.

=== Dairy products ===
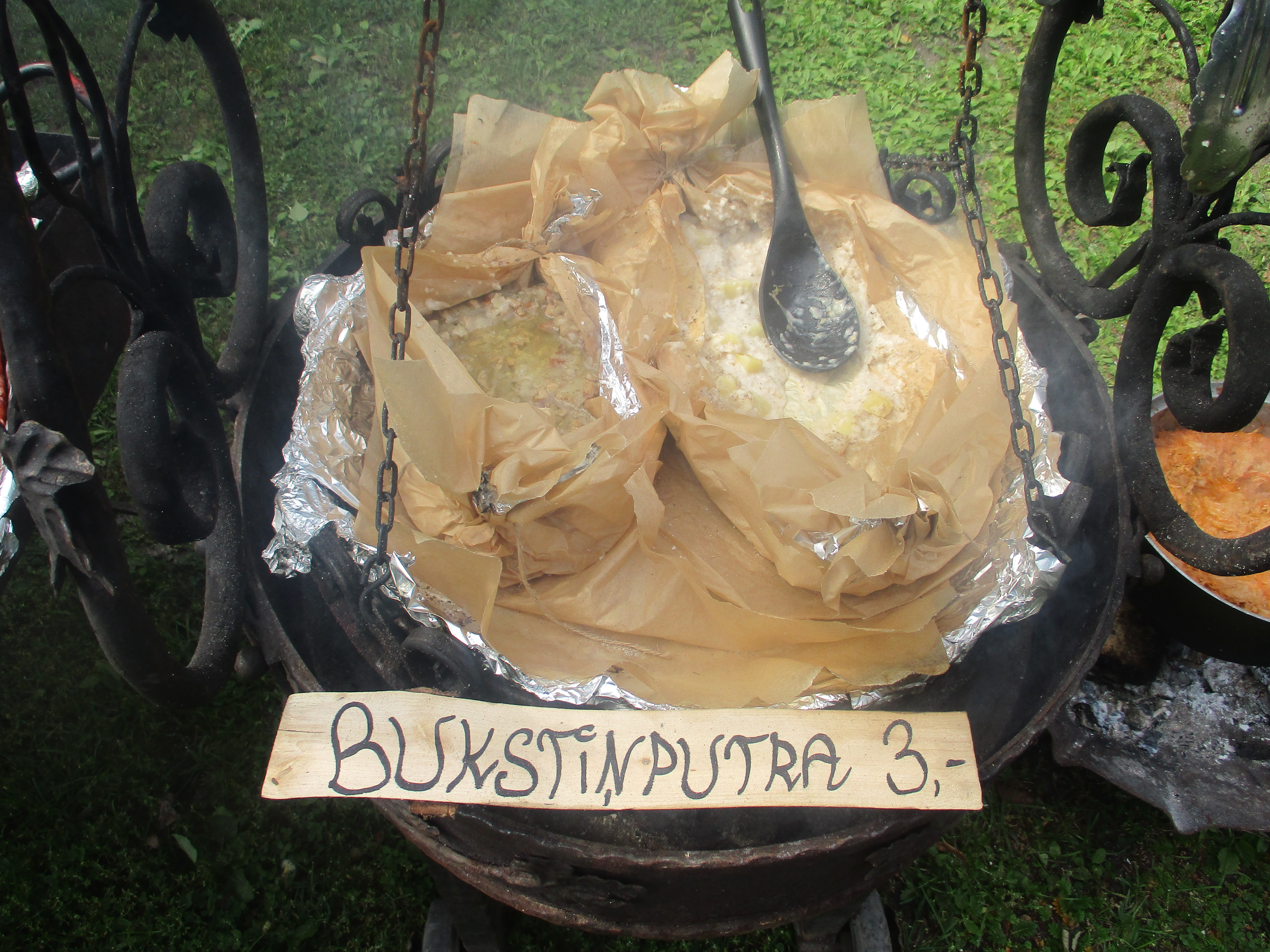
Porridge with potatoes and fried pork belly

Unlike in the rest of the country, where dairy products play a central role, Livonian cuisine pays less attention to this type of food.

Fresh milk was used almost exclusively for immediate consumption or to prepare foods used to make liquid porridge and, more generally, soups. The rest of the milk was fermented to obtain sour cream and/or butter: in Livonia, as in Latvia as a whole, the preparation of Skābputra (skābputr; appõrok), a refreshing cold soup based on sour cream, is widespread.

=== Desserts ===
In the past, sugar was not widespread because it was a valuable commodity, and sweet dishes in traditional Livonian cuisine mainly consisted of recipes based on berries (mōŗad). Berries without sugar were called zapti or zafti.

== See also ==
- Estonian cuisine
- Latvian cuisine
