= Samsa (food) =

Savoury pie

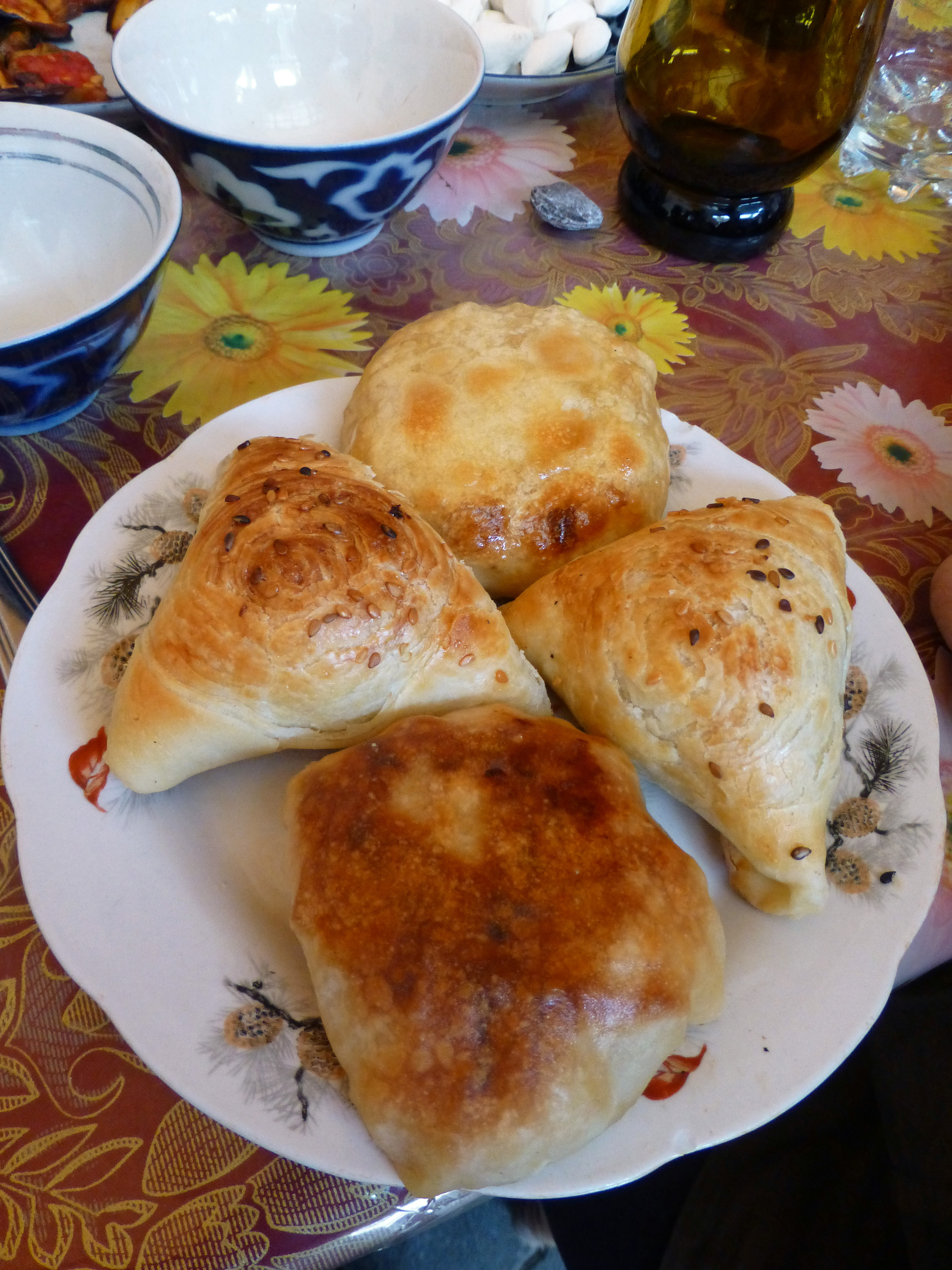
- Uzbek somsas
- Alternative names: Samsy, Somsa, Sambusa
- Place of origin: Central Asia and West Asia
- Associated cuisine: Kazakh, Kyrgyz, Persian, Tajik, Turkish, Turkmen, Uyghur, Uzbek, and Afghan

Samsa (Note: Uzbek: сомса, romanized: somsa, Kazakh: самса, romanized: samsa, Kyrgyz: самса, romanized: samsa, Uyghur: سامسا, romanized: samsa, Turkmen: somsa, Turkish: samsa, Tajik: самбӯса, romanized: sambüsa, Persian: سمبوسه, romanized: sambuse) is a savoury pastry in Central Asian cuisines. It is a bun stuffed with meat and sometimes with vegetables.

In the countries of Kazakhstan, Kyrgyzstan, Tajikistan, Turkmenistan, Uzbekistan, Turkey, Afghanistan and Iran, as well as in the Xinjiang Uygur Autonomous Region of China, samsas are almost always baked. In contrast to South Asian samosas they are rarely fried. The traditional samsa is often baked in the tandoor, which is a special clay oven. The dough can be a simple bread dough or a layered pastry dough. The most common filling for traditional samsa is a mixture of minced lamb and onions, but chicken, minced beef and cheese varieties are also quite common from street vendors. Samsas with other fillings, such as potato or pumpkin (usually only when in season), can also be found.

In Central Asia, samsas are often sold on the streets as a hot snack. They are sold at kiosks, where only samsas are made, or alternatively, at kiosks where other fast foods (such as hamburgers) are sold. Many grocery stores also buy samsas from suppliers and resell them.

Some related or similar dishes include the deep fried Indian snack with a similar name, the samosa.

In Tajik cuisine, sambusa-i varaki are meat-filled pastries, usually triangle-shaped. The filling can be made with ground beef (or the more traditional mutton mixed with tail fat) and then onions, spices, cumin seeds and other seasonings before being baked in a tandyr.

== Samsa in Serbia ==
In the city of Vranje, Serbia, a similar pastry bearing the same name – samsa and also made from layered dough is prepared in a completely different way. Thin sheets of hand-stretched dough are rolled up and cut into smaller pieces to create a "plain pie" (prazna pita – a term used throughout the Balkans for such unfilled pastries). This is then generously topped with soured milk mixed with finely chopped garlic.

This pastry is unique, and not just within Serbian cuisine. Similar dishes exist in other national cuisines, such as the "plain" burek from Serbia, maslenica from Bosnia and Herzegovina, or the sweet, unfilled burek, dusted simply with powdered sugar, as prepared in Turkey.

== Gallery ==
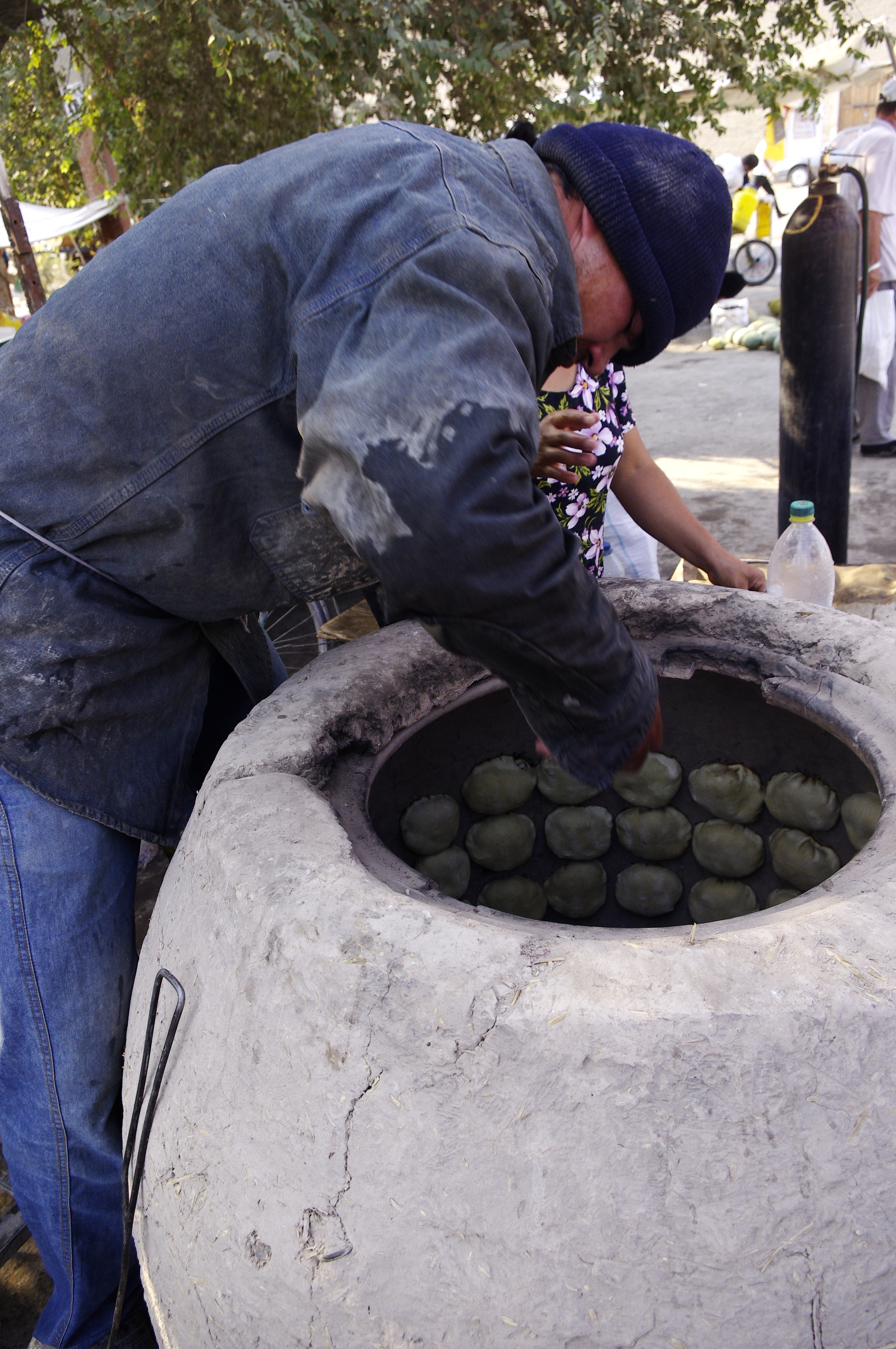
Samsa preparation in a tandoor

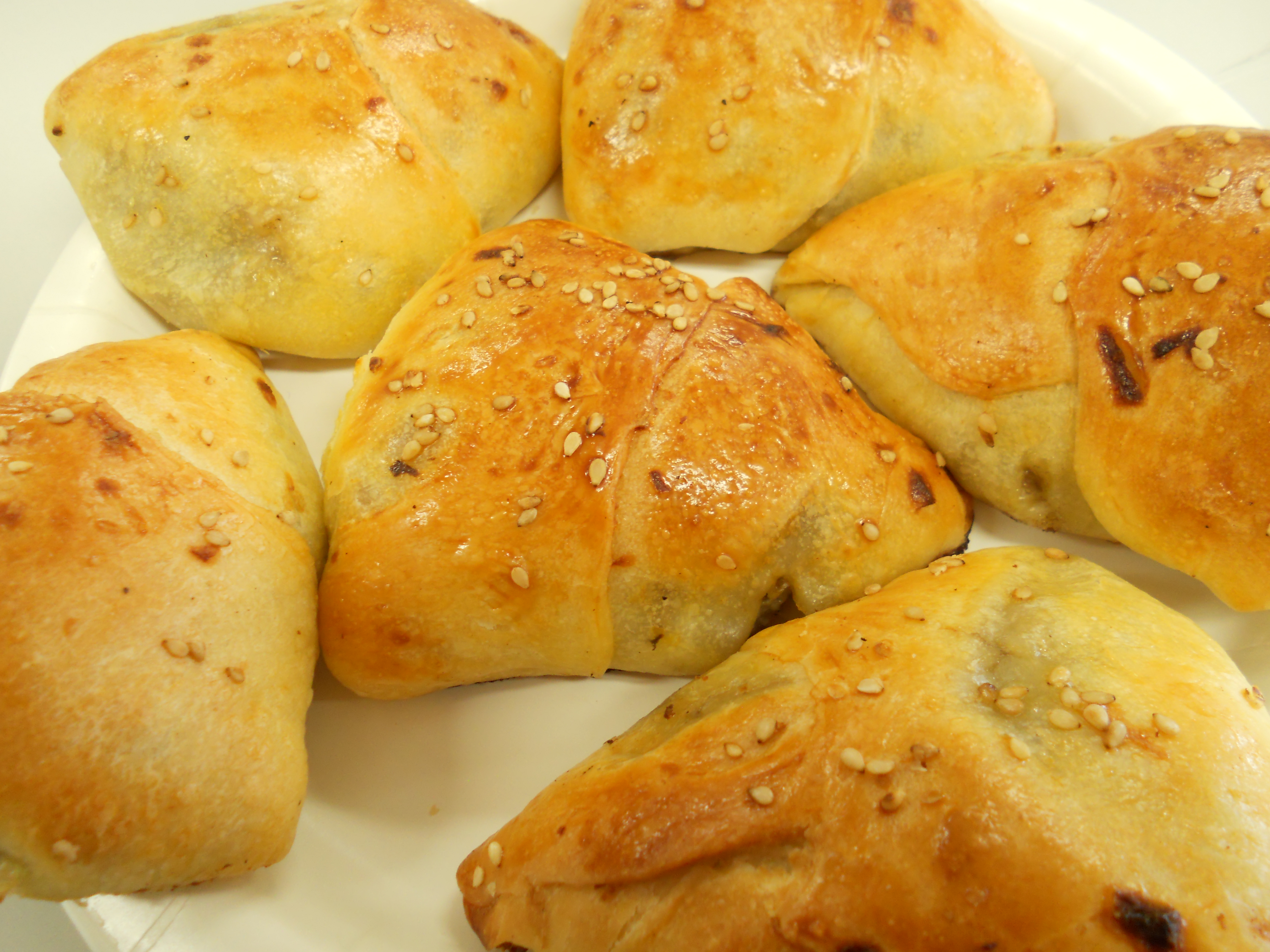
Uyghur-style samsas

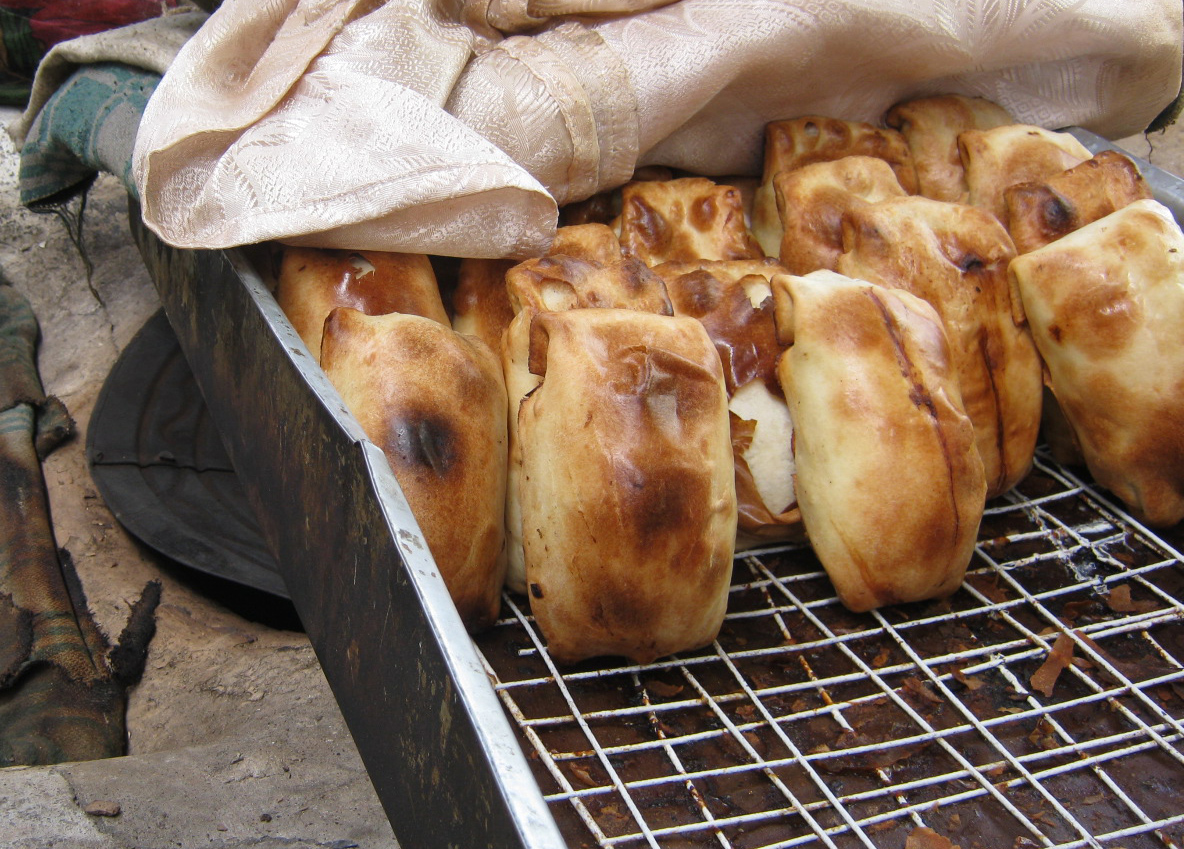
Samsa in Kyrgyzstan

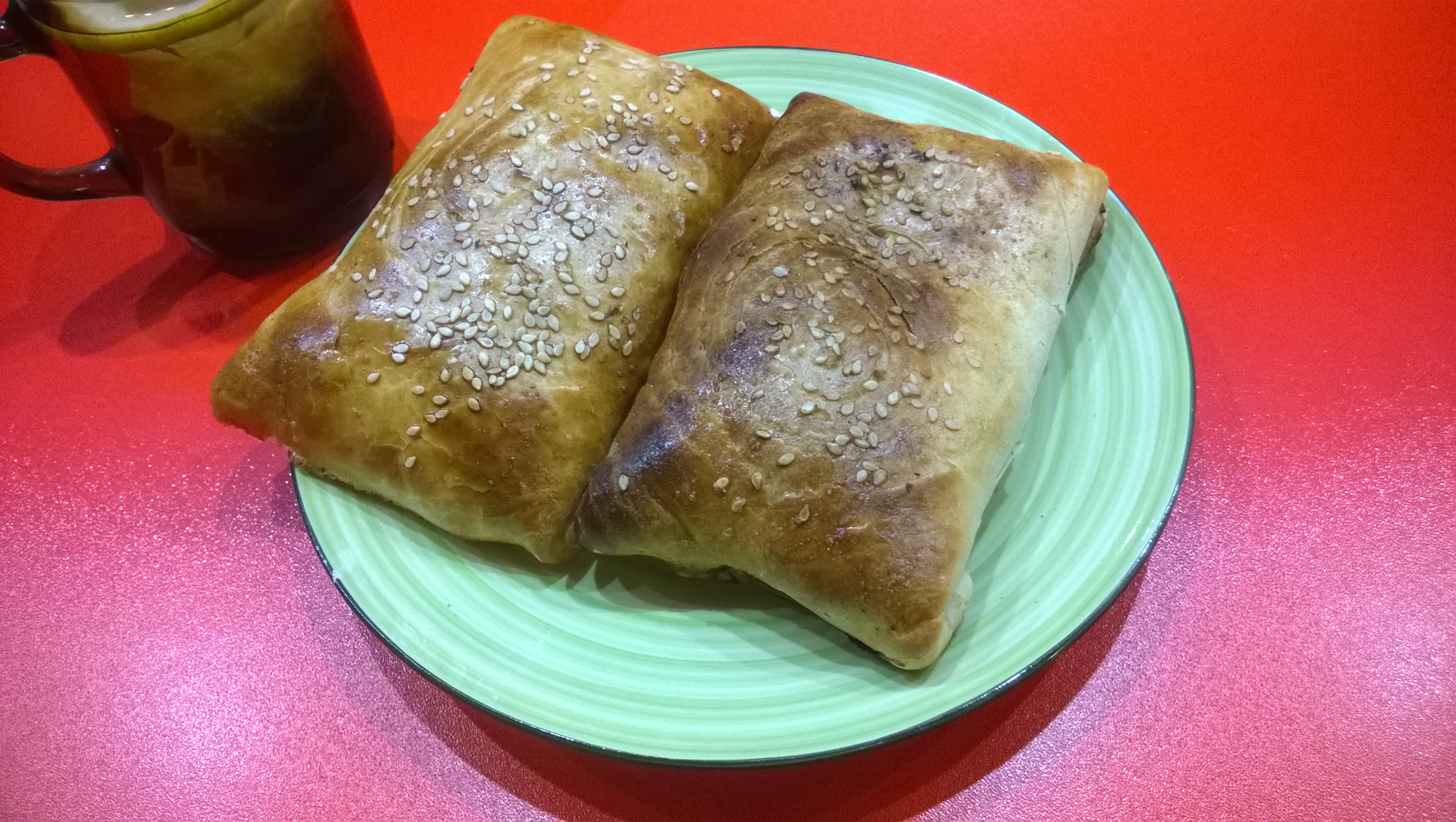
Samsa in a cafe in Russia

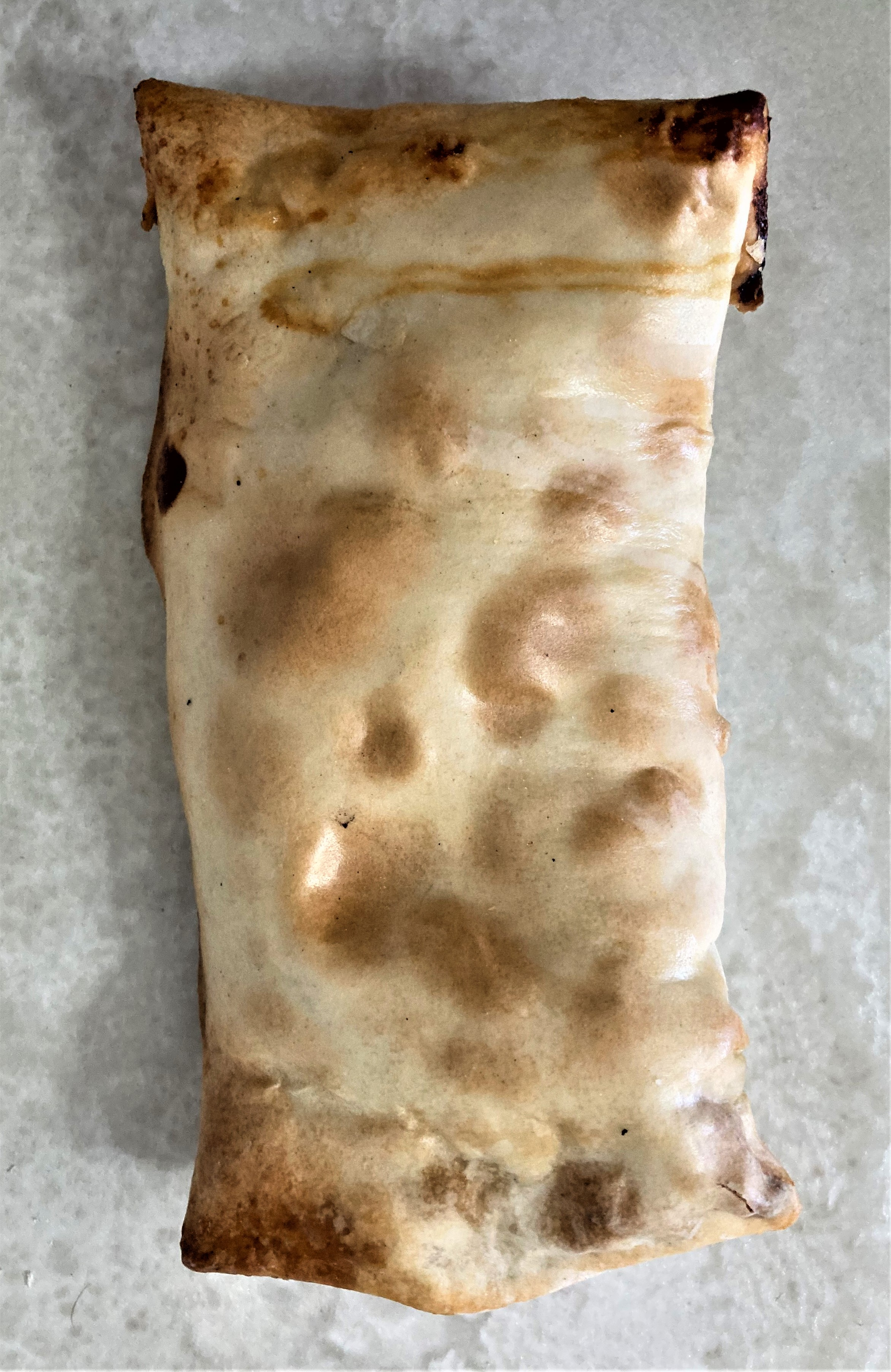
A Turkmen samsa

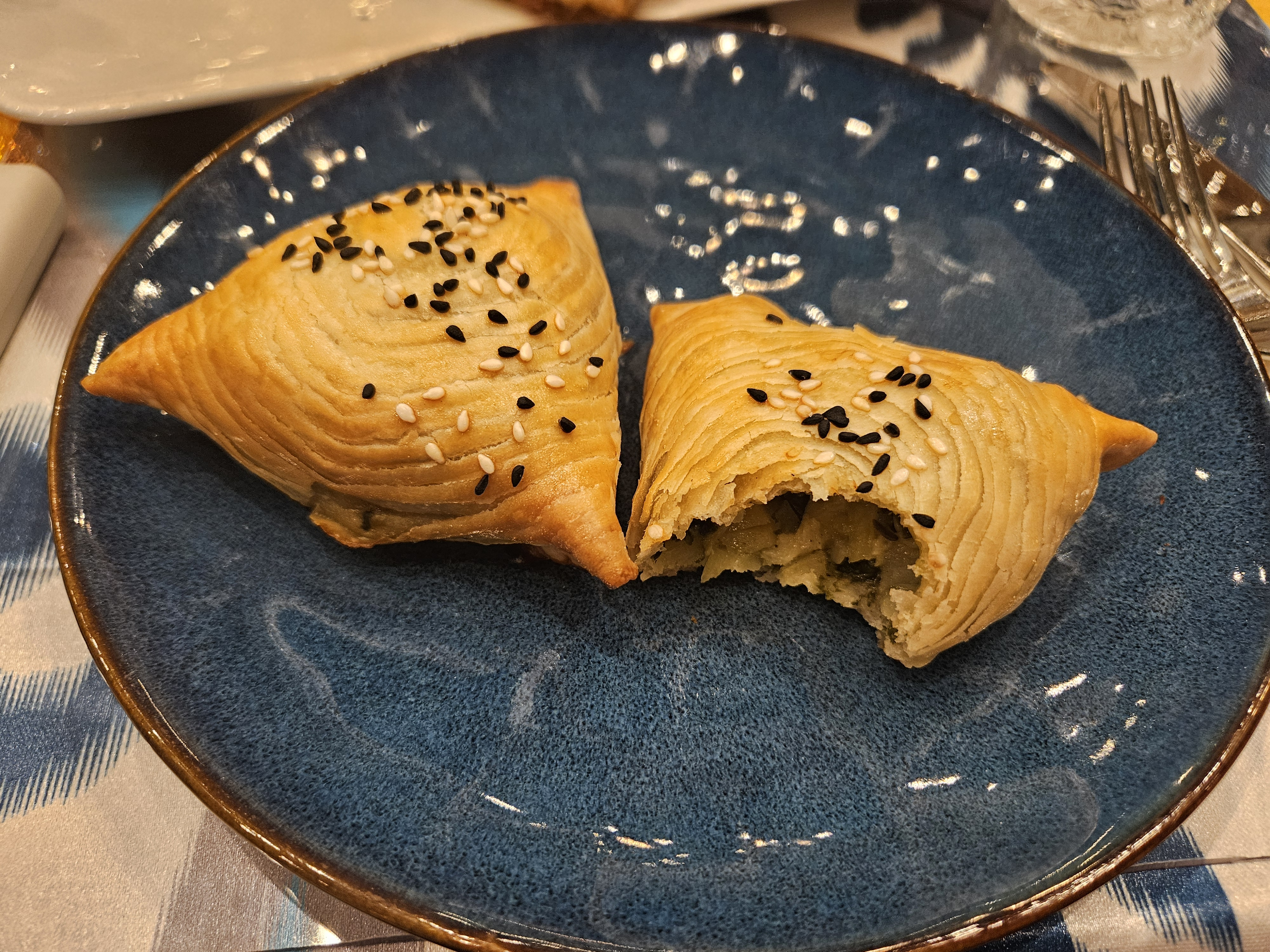
Uzbek samsa in Vienna, Austria

Samsa in Vranje

A piece of Vranje samsa

== See also ==
- Chebureki
- Empanada
- Kibinai
- Meat pie
- Mince pie
- Öçpoçmaq
- Pasty
- Speķrauši
- Murtabak
- Turnover
