= Ziemassvētki =

Annual festival in Latvia

Ziemassvētki ([z̪iemas̪s̪veːt̪ki]), also Ziemsvētki is an annual festival in Latvia which observes the winter solstice and birth of Jesus Christ. Latvians around the world celebrate it from 24 to 25 December. 24 December is Ziemassvētku vakars (Christmas Eve, lit. Christmas Evening), while 25 December is Pirmie Ziemassvētki (First Christmas), 26 December Otrie Ziemassvētki (Second Christmas). Christianity traditionally celebrates the birthday of Jesus Christ on 25 December, according to the Julian calendar, but Orthodox churches follow the Eastern Orthodox liturgical calendar and, as a result, the majority of Orthodox churches celebrate Ziemassvētki on 6, 7 and 8 January.

Ziemassvētki is also celebrated by people whose religious belief is not Christianity. Nowadays the customary Ziemassvētki traditions are decorating the Ziemassvētku egle (Christmas tree), Ziemassvētku vecītis (Santa Claus, lit. Old Christmas Man), baking piparkūkas (gingerbread) and mandarin scent.

== Ziemassvētki fir decoration ==
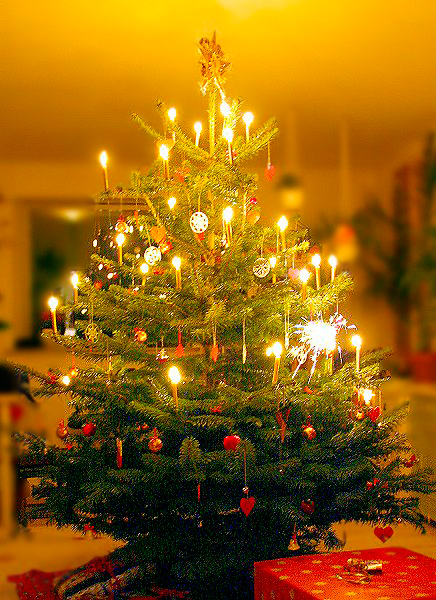
Ziemassvētki fir tree

Ziemassvētki fir decorating custom was known in Livonia even before the 16th century. The Blackheads Guild provided the information in 1510 about winter traditions in Riga and referred to earlier such events in 1476, therefore, the former executive of Riga's House of the Blackheads and historian Ojārs Spārītis considers the historical information on the tradition of decorating a "Ziemassvētki tree" in Riga to originate in 1476.

The Blackheads Guild also indicates that the tree was a bouquet, but, taking into account the customs of the Middle Ages, it can be concluded that such bouquets could only be decorated with ribbons, dried flowers, straw weaved dolls and, possibly, fruits. Later this "tree", which could not be a spruce, but an "installation" made only out of wooden sticks, along with songs and dances were brought forth outside the celebrating house, where it had been located for the entire Ziemassvētki period and was burned on a spot in Town Hall Square around 6 January. The Brotherhood of Blackheads guild showed a similar tradition in Tallinn (known at that time as Revel) in 1514. It is possible that, from here, the tradition spread all over the world (see chronicle quote below).

=== Chronicle news ===
For Yule Eve or Dance Eve impacted on the Blackhead's traditions, which turned log burning into a fir tree burning, as evidenced by these quotations:

Paul Einhorn on Latvian Ziemassvētki traditions from Duchy of Courland's work "Reformatio gentis leticcae in ducatu Curlandiae" (1636):

From how many of their idol deities residues can be understood, that they shamelessly feasted by eating, drinking, dancing, jumping and shouting while walking around, in addition, their Christ Eve in the middle times was not called as Dance Eve for nothing, because they spent this evening and all night with dancing, singing and jumping. That same evening is also called as Yule Eve, because back then they pulled around a log with great shouting, which is then burned and was shown for your enjoyment.

Russow Chronicle on Ziemassvētki traditions in Livonia before 16th century.:

On Winter holidays and before the beginning of Lent, guild houses had no less fun life. After good drinking, the merchant youth installed a large fir tree in Market Square, decorated with roses. In the evening, a large herd with wives and virgins came to the fir tree with songs and games. With good reconciliation, the fir tree is lighted, where in the darkness of a night a light burns. While clasping hands, new merchants danced and hopped around the fir tree. Rocket was also placed. Although pastors preached against such dance, comparing it with a dance around the golden calf, no one deemed them worthy of attention. Likewise, it neither measured nor ended roundabout amusements, day and night, wife and virgin society, despite all the pastor's sermons.

== Latvian traditions ==
=== Ancient Latvian traditions ===
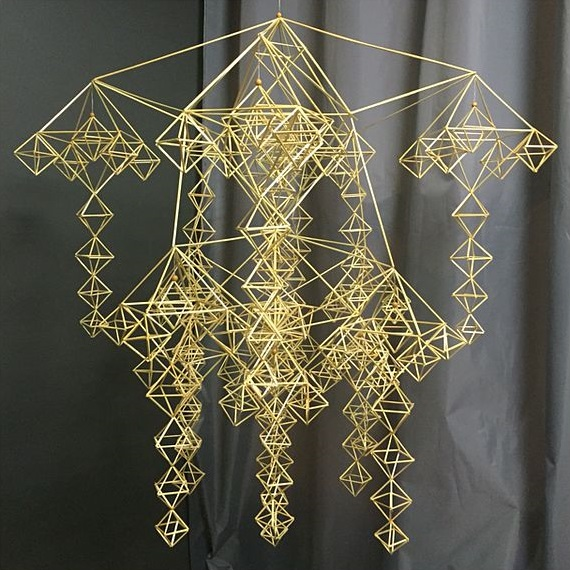
Puzuris, a Latvian traditional Ziemassvētki straw art mobile decoration

Alongside Ziemassvētki, an ancient Latvian tradition is preserved in the so-called Yule Eve, reminiscent of ancient ritual activities - log pulling, mimicking solar progress. In some countries, Solstice Eve is also called Ķūķu (variants - Ķoču, Kūķu, Ķūcu) Eve, suggesting an ancient ritual holiday meal choice, which promoted prosperity and welfare. It was made from shelled (crushed in a mortar) barley or wheat grains, which were boiled with a half of a pig head; the spread tended to also add peas and beans.

Another widely known Ziemassvētki tradition was ķekatas walking or gypsies walking. Mummers, dressed in various masks, went from one village to another, to bring them blessing and to drive away various evil spirits. Therefore, mummers everywhere were gladly welcomed and treated. Budēļi leader - father budēļi or elder budēļi, who had all mummers serve to a regimental leader, always carried along a ferrule, which was used to whip all the people in the house. This was Father Budēļi's ferrule of life, to which Latvian tradition attributed a magical power of health, fertility and carried a moral status, in tune with Europe wide distributed habit of expecting winter solstice with scalded branches, they took it along for marches and, touched with it people and beasts, transferring to them a life force, that dwells in these branches. In Courland and Semigallia regions, ķekatas or ķiņķēziņus (ķēmus) were called budēļi (also known as bubuļi, buduļi, buki, būzaļi, buzuļi) or dancing children, Vidzeme region calls them vecīši, maskās (maskarati), skutelnieki (suselnieki), nūjinieki (kūjinieki), preiļi, kurciemi. Latgale region ķekatas mummers were called kaļedās (kaladnieki; cf. "Koliada") or talderi.

The idea of masking is based on ancient fertility rites. Usually, maskās tried to portray themselves as spirits, who wanted to either placate or impress. One of the best known ancient mummer masks was a bear mask because it was believed a bear with his growl was able to frighten off all evil spirits. Buki's masks were made under the sheet by affixing a flexible card arcing downward, which was covered with a sheet and attached to it horns and a beard, as for cranes - they inverted the fur coat to the other side and in one sleeve put an ax with a head, with spoons tied to both sides, which looked like ears and a beak, which could be modified.

One of the mummers' customs was also to disguise as death, when one of the mummers covered himself with a white sheet, preparing from turnips redundant teeth. One hand holds a wooden dagger, which was smudged in red color, second hand bore a plate, which was put into a combustible substance. This fire cast light on death's face to look pale, similar to a corpse.

=== Modern Latvian traditions ===
Traditional Latvian decorations on Ziemassvētki are spruce branches and decorations, which are made from bird's feathers and eggs, straw, bentgrass, fruits, vegetables, and berries. Gifts are given, which are usually placed under the fir tree. To get a gift it is often required to recite a poem or sing a song. An adopted tradition is that gifts are brought by Ziemassvētku vecītis (also known as Santa Claus or Salavecis in recent times), who is sometimes helped by dwarfs or Snow White.

At a children's party during Ziemassvētki, people often dress up as wild beasts and dwarfs, which is the ancient tradition of lending. Also, Father Budēļi or Elder was turned into Ziemassvētku vecītis or Salavecis because of new traditions.

== See also ==
- Public holidays in Latvia
