= Traditional food =

Foods and dishes that are passed on through generations

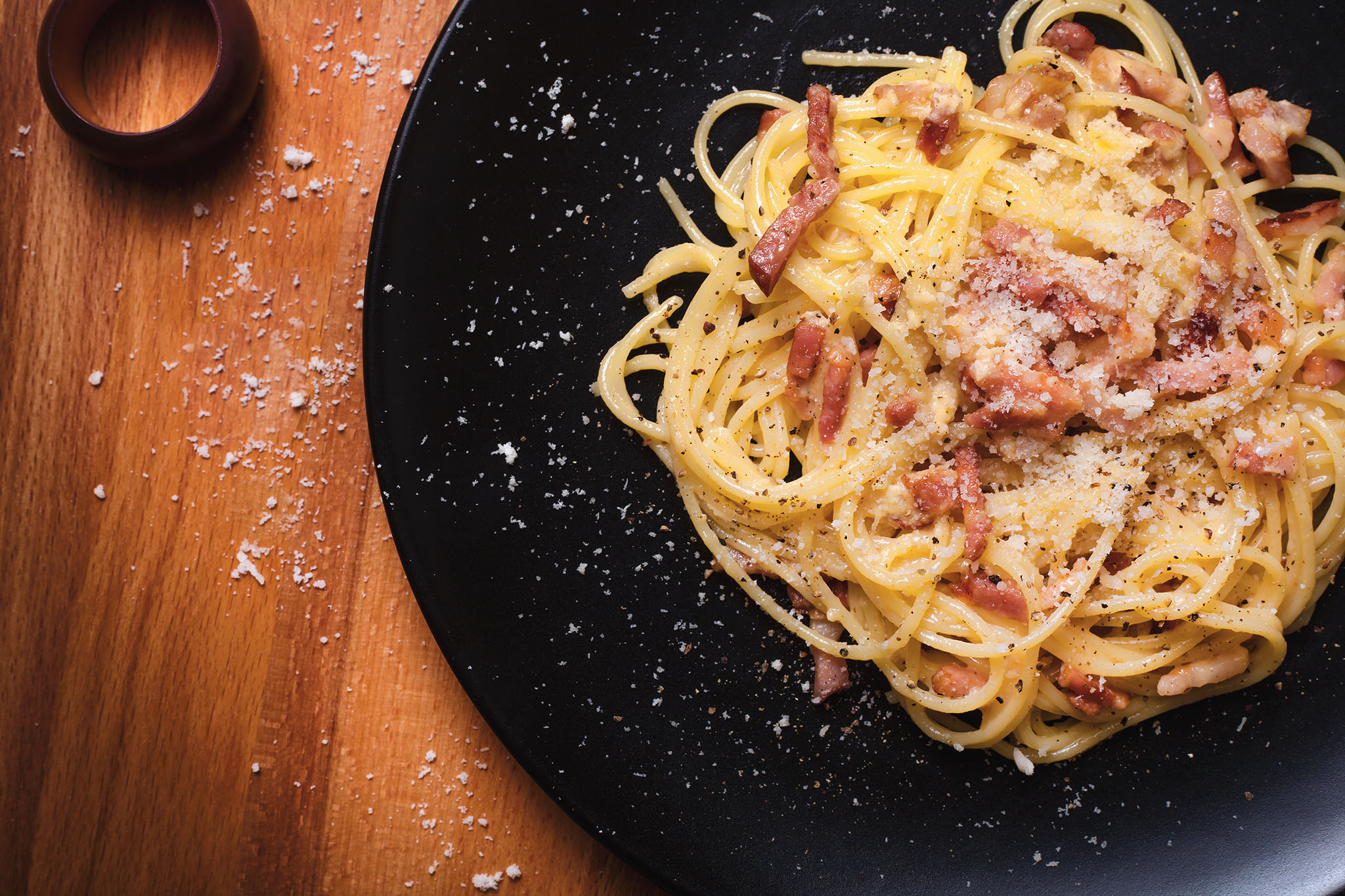
A dish of pasta (carbonara). Pasta is considered one of the traditional foods of Italy

Traditional foods are foods and dishes that are passed on through generations or which have been consumed for many generations. Traditional foods and dishes are traditional in nature, and may have a historic precedent in a national dish, regional cuisine or local cuisine. Traditional foods and beverages may be produced as homemade, by restaurants and small manufacturers, and by large food processing plant facilities.

Some traditional foods have geographical indications and traditional specialties in the European Union designations per European Union schemes of geographical indications and traditional specialties: Protected designation of origin (PDO), Protected geographical indication (PGI) and Traditional specialties guaranteed (TSG). These standards serve to promote and protect names of quality agricultural products and foodstuffs.

This article also includes information about traditional beverages.

== Difference between traditional and typical ==
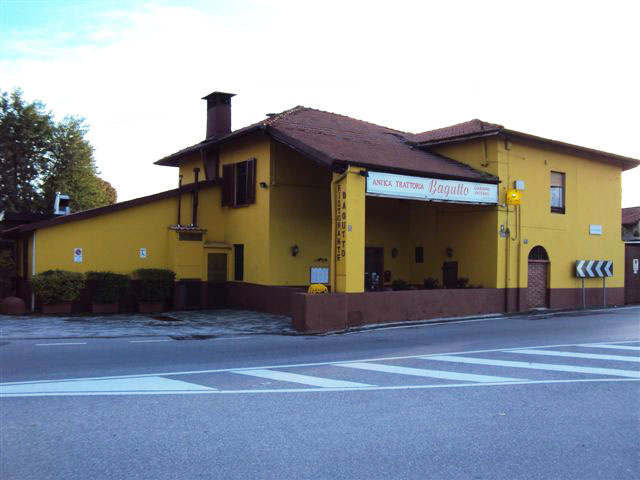
The Antica trattoria Bagutto in Milan, the oldest restaurant in Italy and the second in Europe

Although it is common for them to be used as synonyms, the truth is that "traditional" cuisine and "typical" cuisine are considered two different concepts according to culinary anthropology; The first refers to culinary customs that are invariably inherited orally, on a small scale in the family, and a large scale in a community as part of its culture and identity. On the other hand, when we speak of typical (or "popular") cuisine, it is one that most people in a place like and is massively replicated. Therefore, a traditional dish may be typical and vice versa, but not all the typical dishes are traditional nor all the traditional ones typical.

Most traditional dishes originate from the skill of housewives who creatively and sensibly combined the techniques and ingredients they had on hand to create new recipes. If people like that recipe, it becomes worthy of being imitated. In other words, it is spread and replicated so many times that it becomes a classic recipe. For this reason, the culinary tradition is made up of a vast variety of classic recipes, which are necessarily linked to a land of origin, specific products, and specific local habits. There are classic recipes that can fall into oblivion and disappear forever, but if they are consumed massively, they become part of the typical cuisine of a place. The Mexican culinary anthropologist Maru Toledo adds a third concept to this process, which is that of "typical commercial" cuisine, something that did not exist until the commercialization of cuisine (a process that has occurred very recently, if we observe the complete chronology of food history).

=== Commercialized cuisine ===
The commercialized cuisine appropriates the characteristics of the traditional (even the same adjective "traditional", on numerous occasions) but the aim is none other than economic profit. For this reason, it does not want to delve into the origin, nor in the context, much less the diversity around the dishes, it sells. Finally, the mainstream population, generally without much culinary knowledge, believe that the food they are buying is their own, thus happening a kind of food acculturation and simplifying the diversity of products, techniques, recipes and other culinary aspects of the tradition.

== By continent ==
=== Africa ===
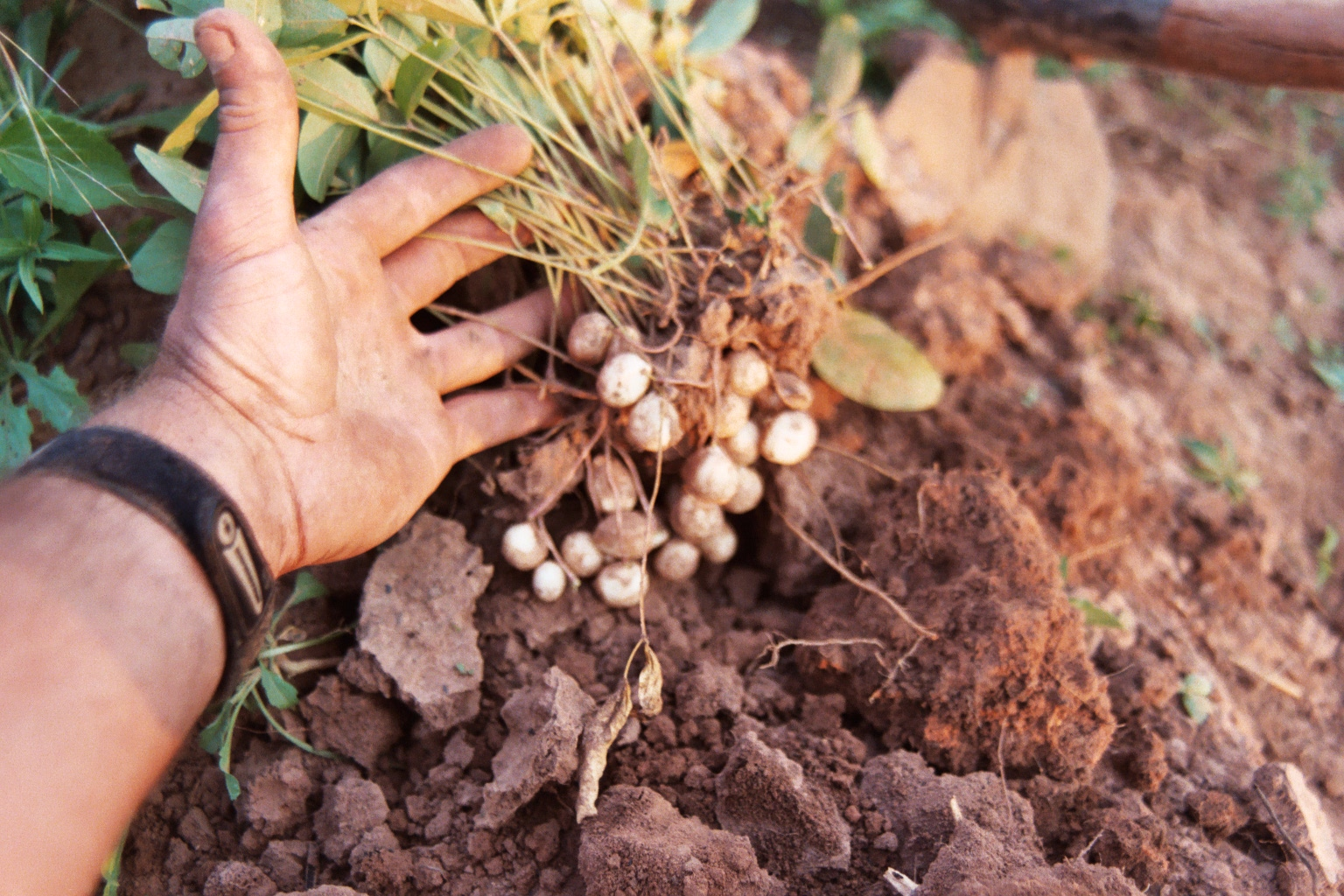
Freshly harvested Bambara groundnuts

- Bambara groundnut – a traditional food crop in Africa

=== Europe ===
Traditional food products have been described as playing "an important part of European culture, identity, and heritage".

=== South America ===
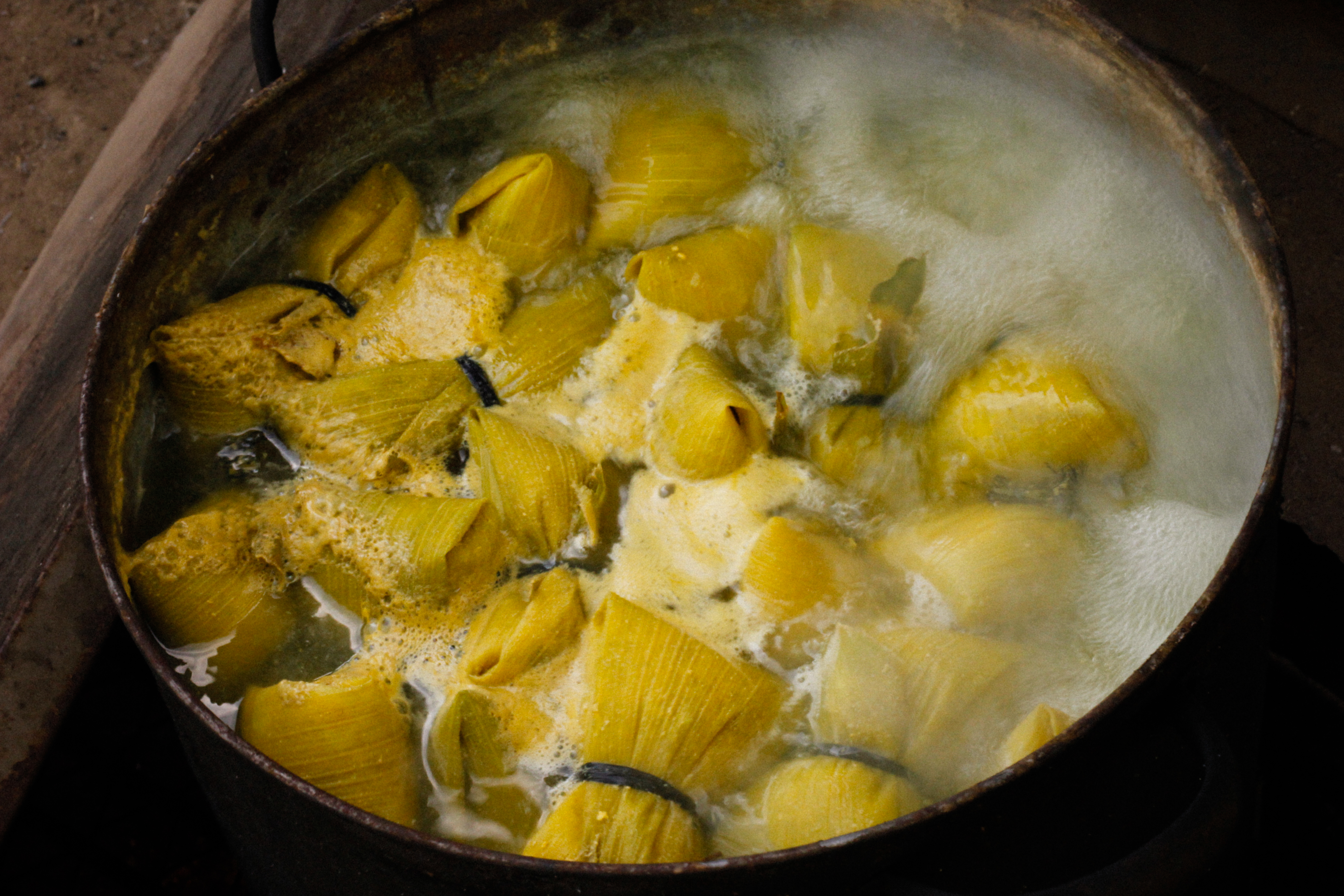
Wrapped humitas being cooked

- Humita – a traditional food in Bolivia, Chile, Ecuador, and Peru

== By country ==
=== Canada ===
- Country food refers to the traditional diets of Aboriginal people (known in Canada as First Nations, Metis, and Inuit), especially in remote northern regions where Western food is an expensive import, and traditional foods are still relied upon.
- Thanksgiving dinner

==== Québec ====
- Poutine
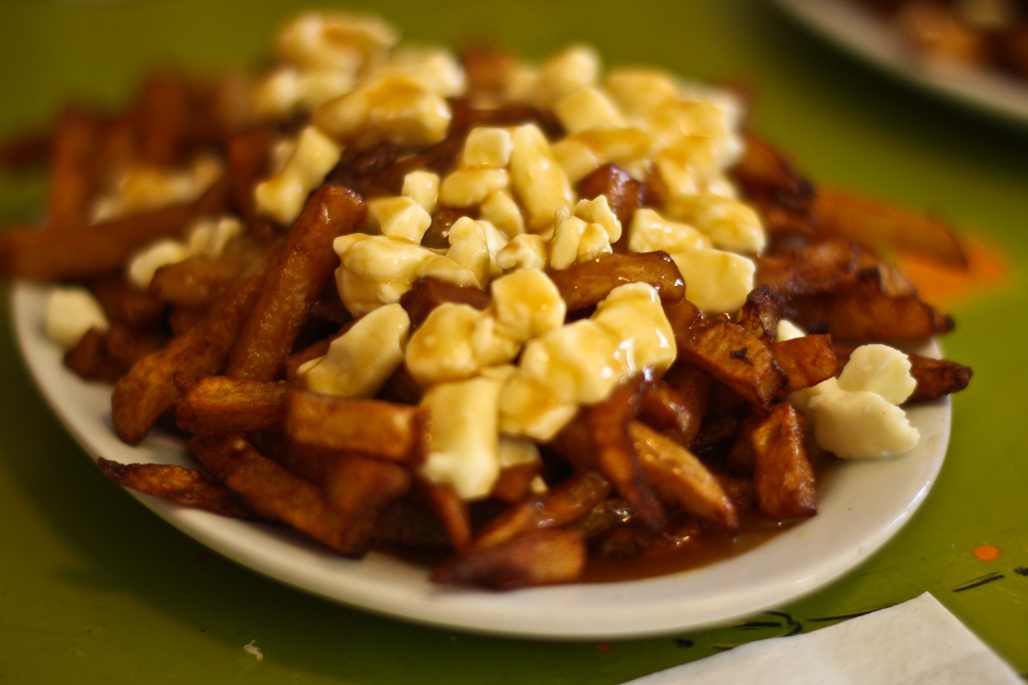
  A classic poutine is made with french fries, cheese curds and gravy.
- Tourtière
- Sucre à la crème
- Pâté chinois
- Pouding chômeur
- St. Catherine's taffy
- Spruce beer
- Maple syrup
- Cretons

==== Acadia ====
- Poutine râpée
- Fricot

=== China ===
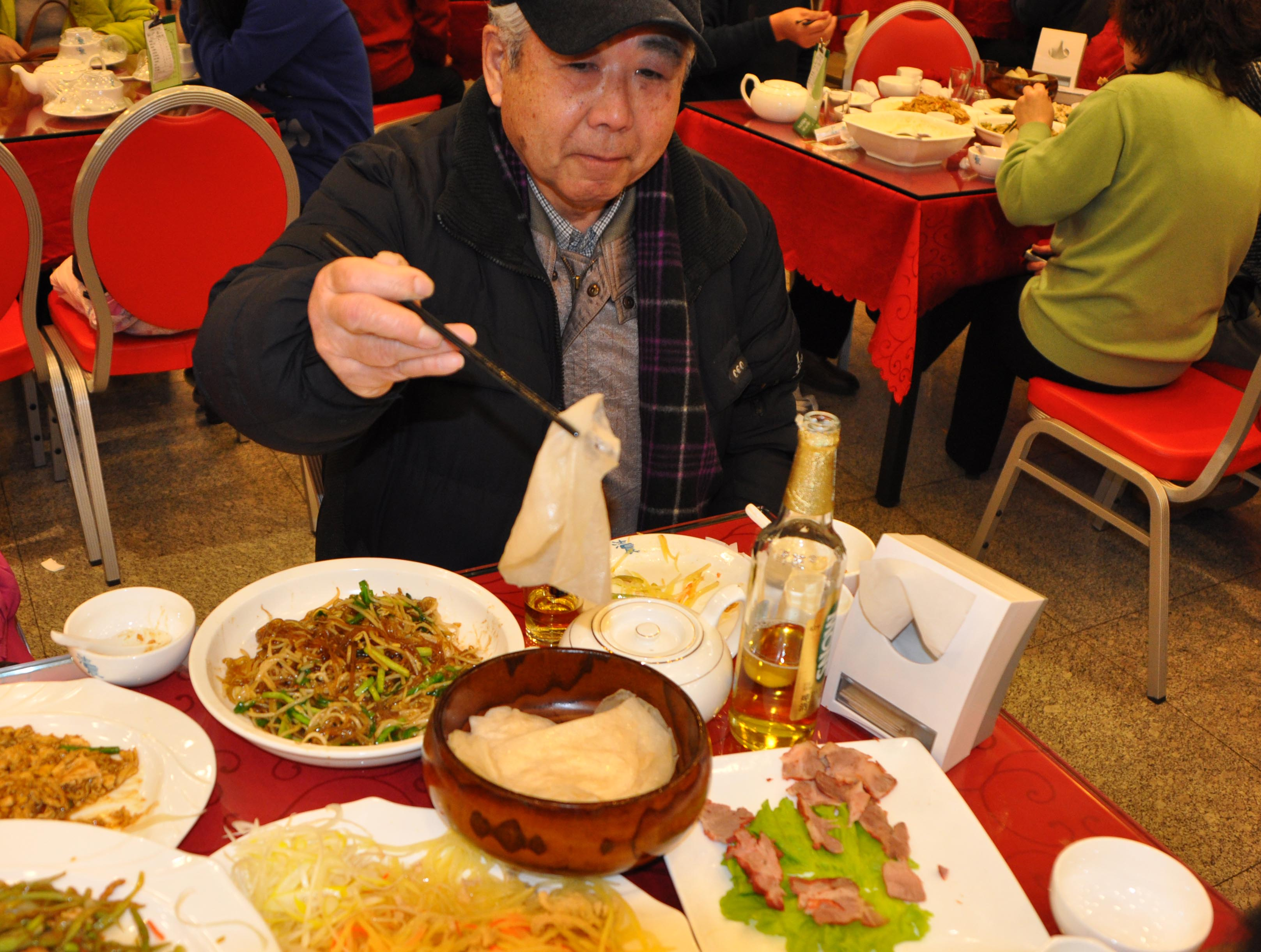
Eating spring pancakes on the day of Lichun in a restaurant

- Ciba cake
- Dim sum
- Fuling jiabing – a traditional snack food of Beijing and an integral part of the city's culture. It is a pancake-like snack made from flour, sugar, and fuling (Poria), rolled around nuts, honey, and other ingredients.
- Spring pancake – a traditional Chinese food unique to the northern regions. People eat spring pancakes on the day called lichun to celebrate the beginning of spring.
- Zhongzi - sticky rice with savory or sweet ingredients wrapped in bamboo leaves and boiled. Made to commemorate the poet and minister Qu Yuan during the Dragon boat festival.

=== Costa Rica ===
- Rice and beans

=== Croatia ===
- Lecsó

=== Cyprus ===
- Tsamarella – a traditional food and one of Cyprus' main lunch meats

=== Czech Republic ===
- Lecsó
- Svíčková

=== Estonia ===
- Mulgipuder
- Sepik

=== Faroe Islands ===
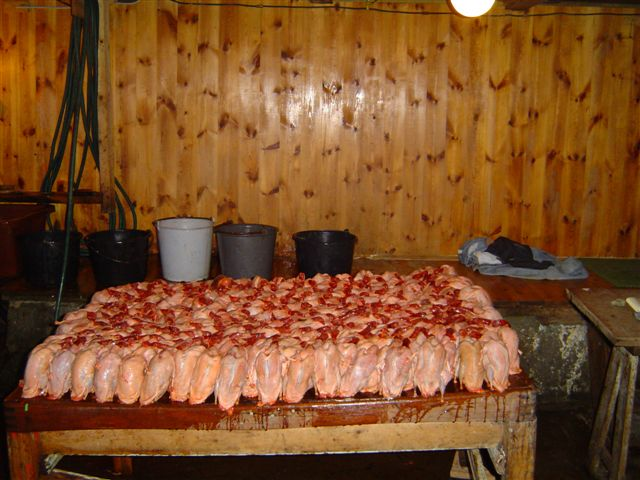
Faroese puffins prepared for the kitchen in Dímun

- Faroese puffin
- Garnatálg
- Skerpikjøt
- Whale meat

=== Finland ===
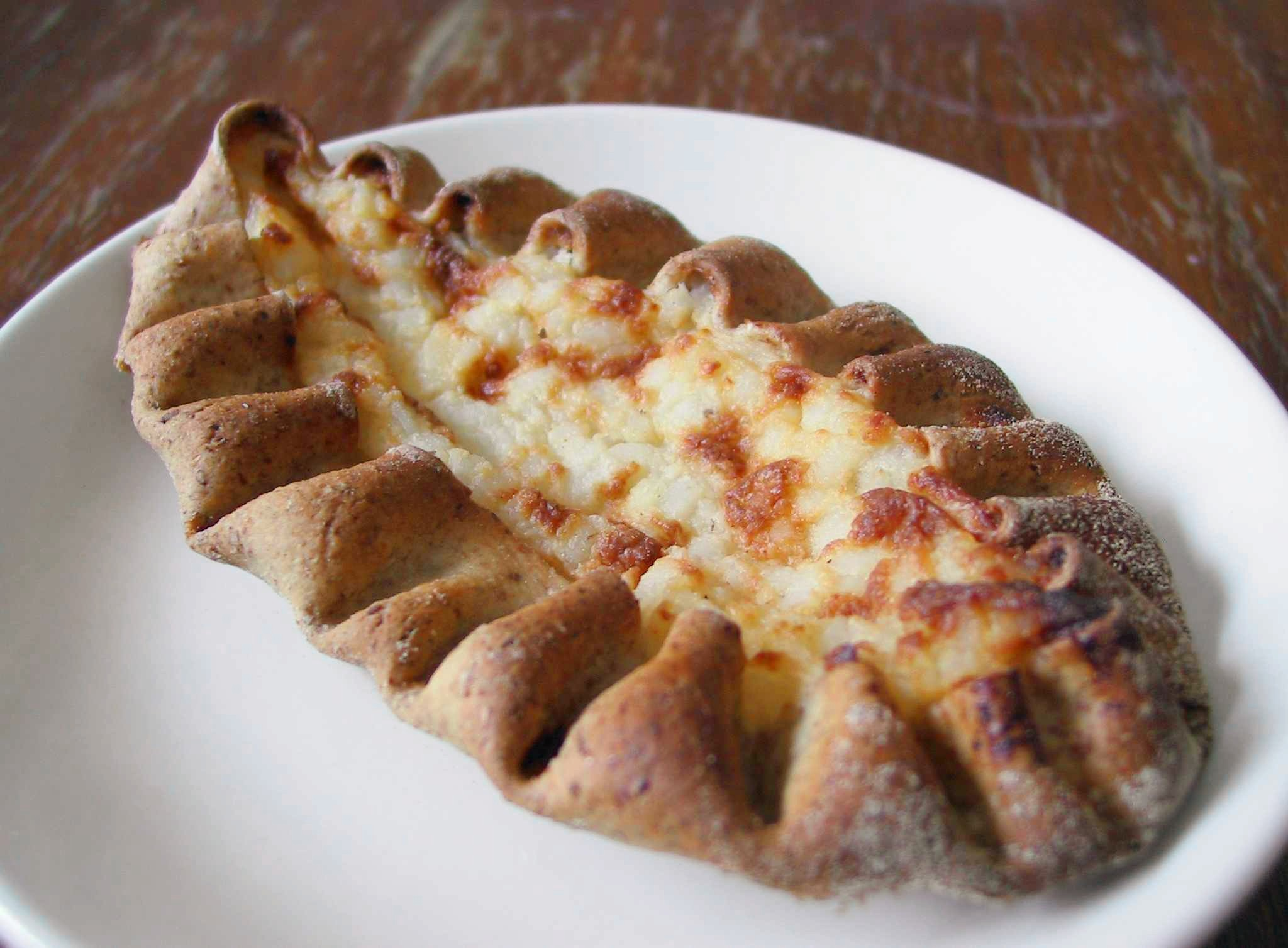
A store-bought Karelian pasty

- Karelian stew
- Karelian pasty
- Kesäkeitto
- Sautéed reindeer
- Ruisreikäleipä
- Ryynimakkara
- Mustamakkara
- Kalakukko
- Lörtsy
- Rönttönen
- Sultsina
- Mämmi
- Joulutorttu

=== France ===
- Appellation d'origine contrôlée – the French certification granted to certain French geographical indications for wines, cheeses, butters, and other agricultural products
  - Bresse chicken – a French chicken product with appellation d'origine contrôlée status
  - List of Appellation d'Origine Contrôlée liqueurs and spirits
  - List of Appellation d'Origine Contrôlée wines

=== Germany ===
- Black Forest ham – produced in the Black Forest region of Germany, it is a Protected Designation of Origin (PDO) food in the European Union.

=== Guatemala ===
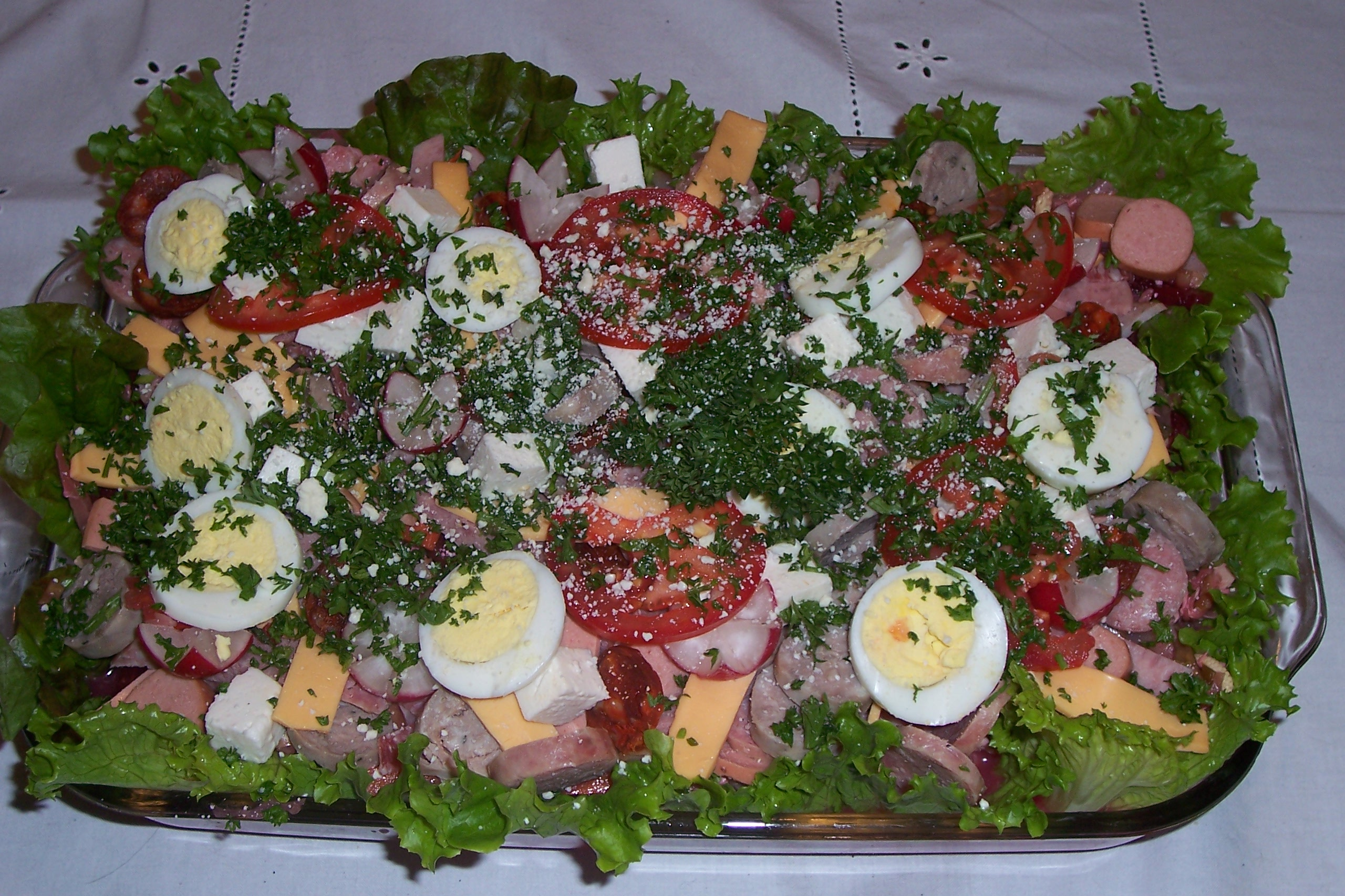
Fiambre

- Fiambre is a traditional Guatemalan dish that is prepared and eaten yearly to celebrate the Day of the Dead (Día de Los Muertos) and the All Saints Day (Día de Todos Los Santos).

=== Iceland ===
- Hákarl – a traditional food and national dish of Iceland
- Hangikjöt
- Þorramatur – a selection of traditional Icelandic food, consisting mainly of meat and fish products cured in a traditional manner, cut into slices or pieces and served with rúgbrauð (dense and dark rye bread), butter and brennivín (an Icelandic akvavit)

=== India ===
- Kheer
- Roti and Sabzi

==== South Indian cuisine ====
- Idli
- Dosa
- Sambar and Chutneys
- Rasam
- Puttu
- Idiyappam
- Paniyaram

=== Indonesia ===
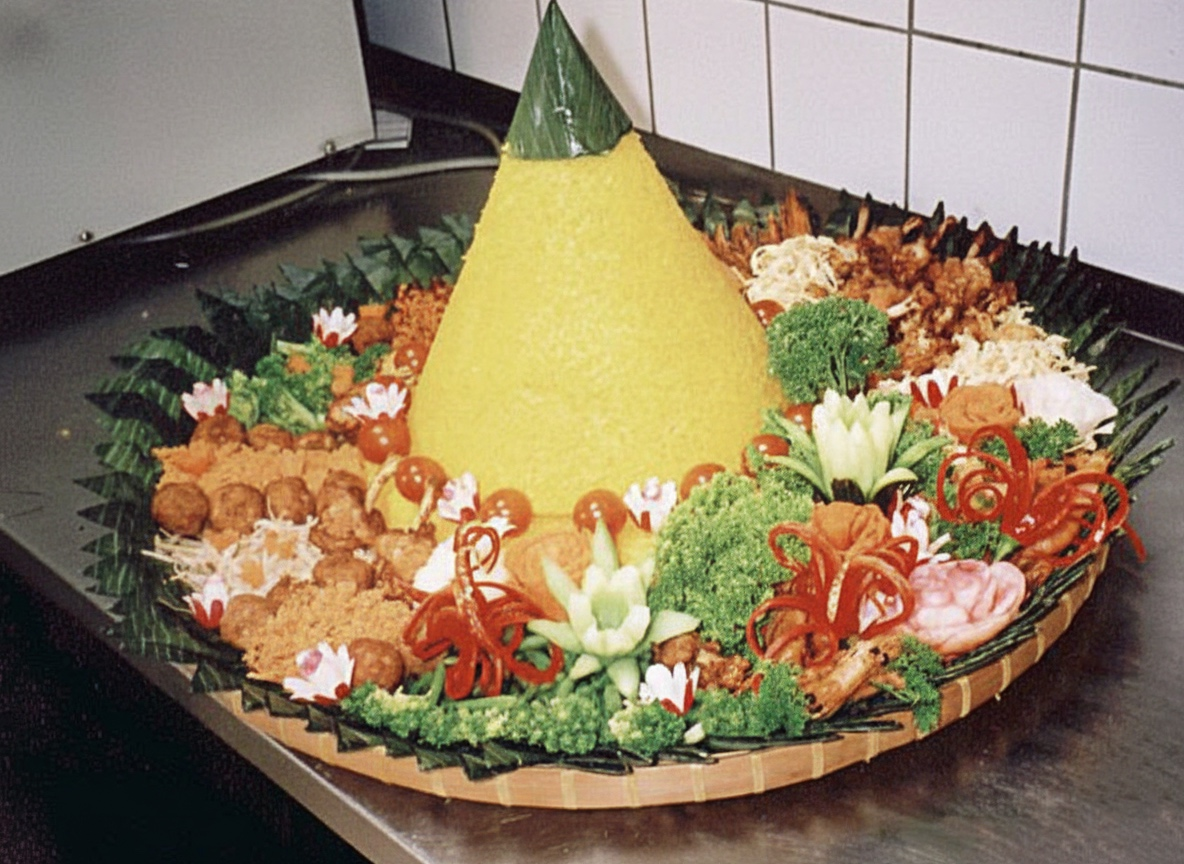
Tumpeng is an Indonesian national dish

- Brem – a fermented snack and beverage from Java and Bali
- Docang – a traditional food from Cirebon
- Gado-gado – a traditional salad in peanut sauce dressing
- Gudeg – a young unripe jackfruit stew, a traditional food from Yogyakarta
- Ketupat – a traditional rice dumpling commonly served during Lebaran, Indonesian idul fitri
- Kuluban – an ancient Javanese traditional salad
- Lawar – a traditional Balinese vegetable dish
- Opor ayam – chicken in coconut milk stew, a traditional dish commonly consumed with ketupat during Lebaran
- Pallubasa – a traditional food from Makassar, South Sulawesi made from offal of cattle or buffalo
- Papeda – sago congee, a traditional staple of Eastern Indonesia (Maluku and Papua)
- Rendang – traditional Minangkabau dish from West Sumatra
- Satay – grilled meat on skewers, various traditional regional variants exist in Indonesia
- Soto – a category of traditional soup of Indonesia, numerous regional variations exist
- Tempeh – fermented soy cake, traditional food from Java
- Tumpeng – a ceremonial rice cone surrounded by various side dishes, an Indonesian national dish

=== Iran ===
- Chelow kabab
- Tahdig
- Ghormeh sabzi
- Fesenjān
- Sabzi polo
- Abgoosht
- Gheimeh
- Sholezard
- Āsh
- Mirza Ghassemi
- Nargesi
- Baghala ghatogh

=== Ireland ===
- Full breakfast
- Sunday roast (Note: "... the sizzle of the traditional Sunday roast.")

=== Italy ===
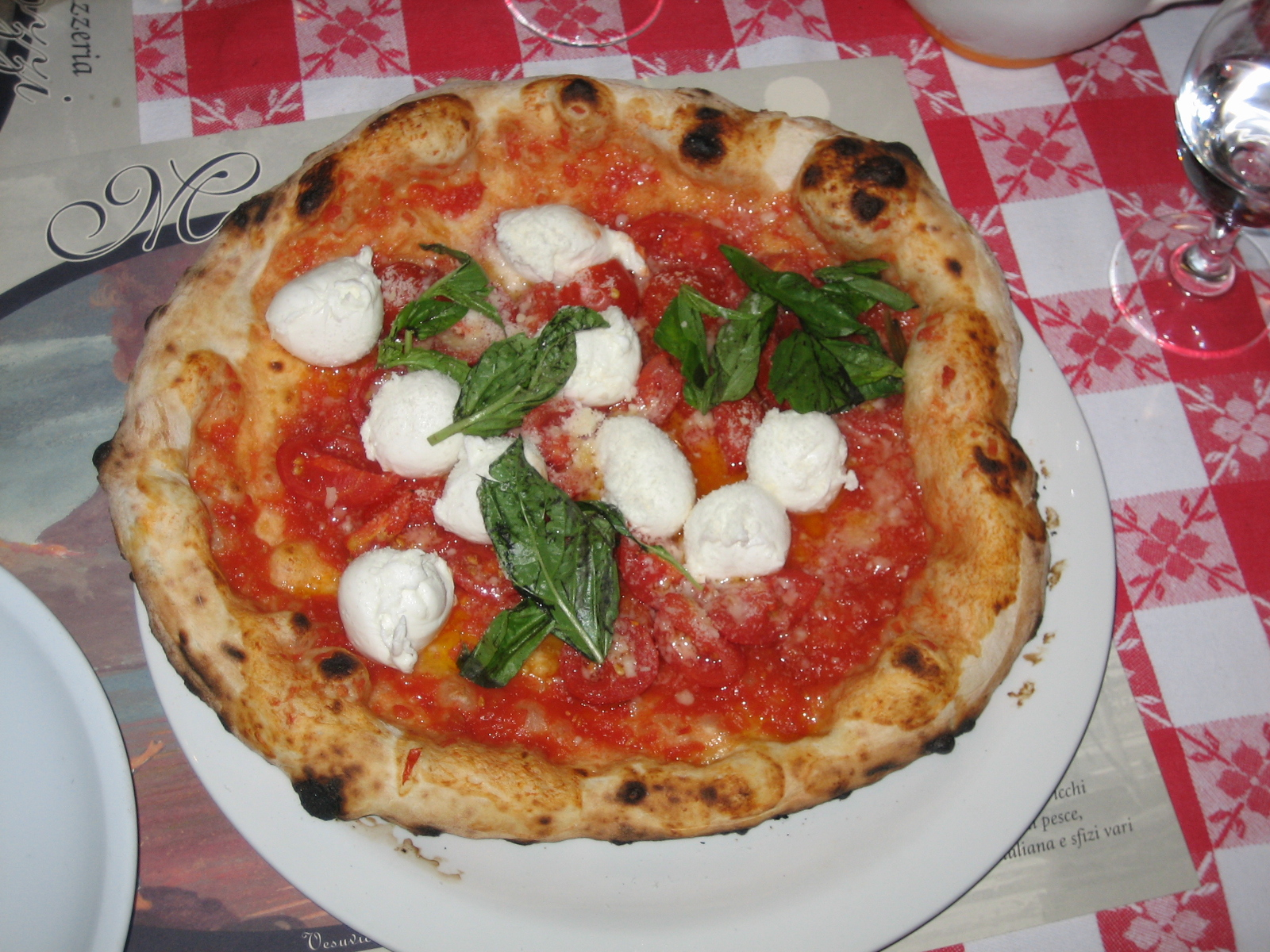
A type of pizza (pizza margherita). Pizza is considered one of the traditional foods of Italy and its variants are among the most popular foods in the world

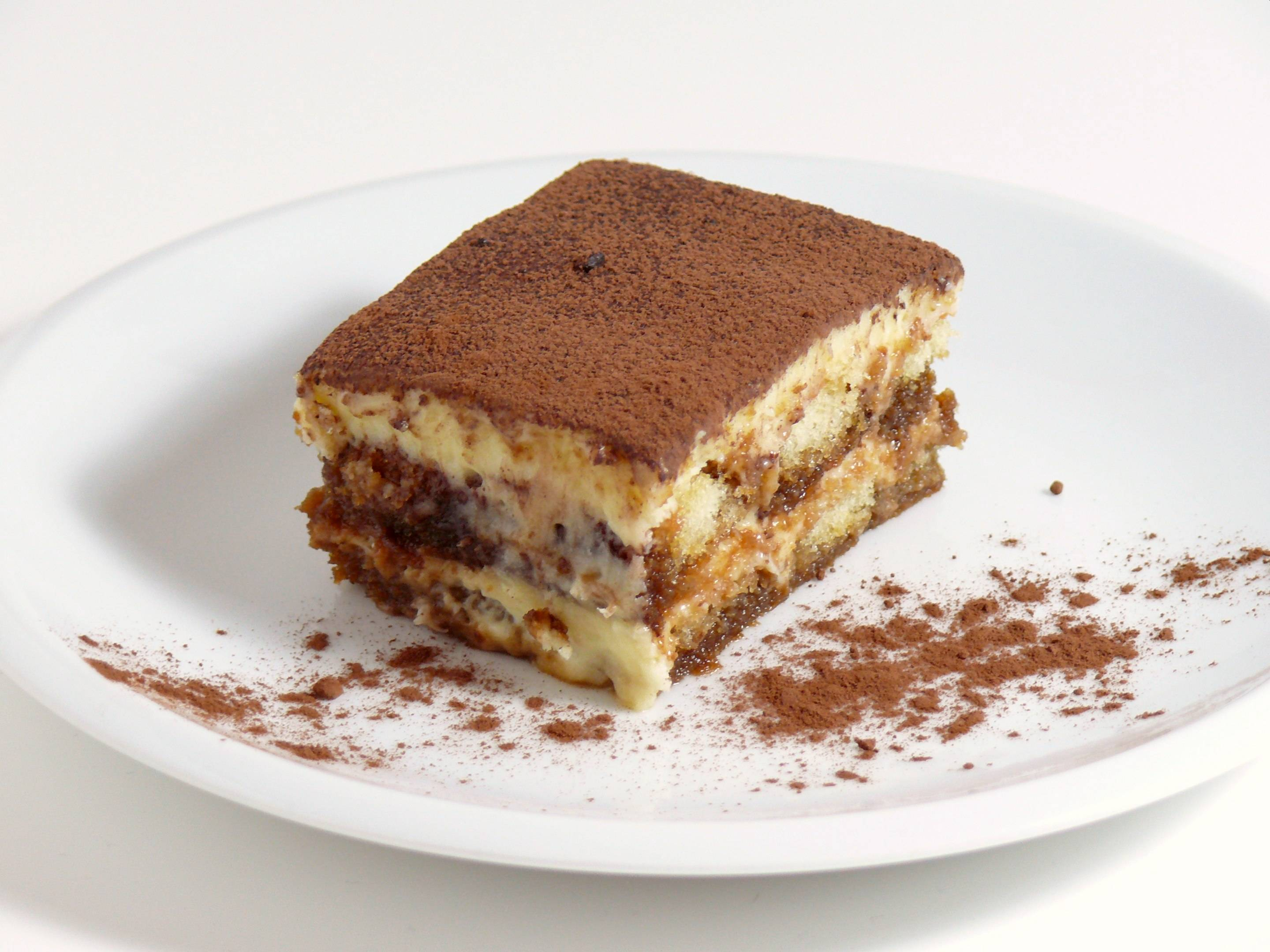
Tiramisu

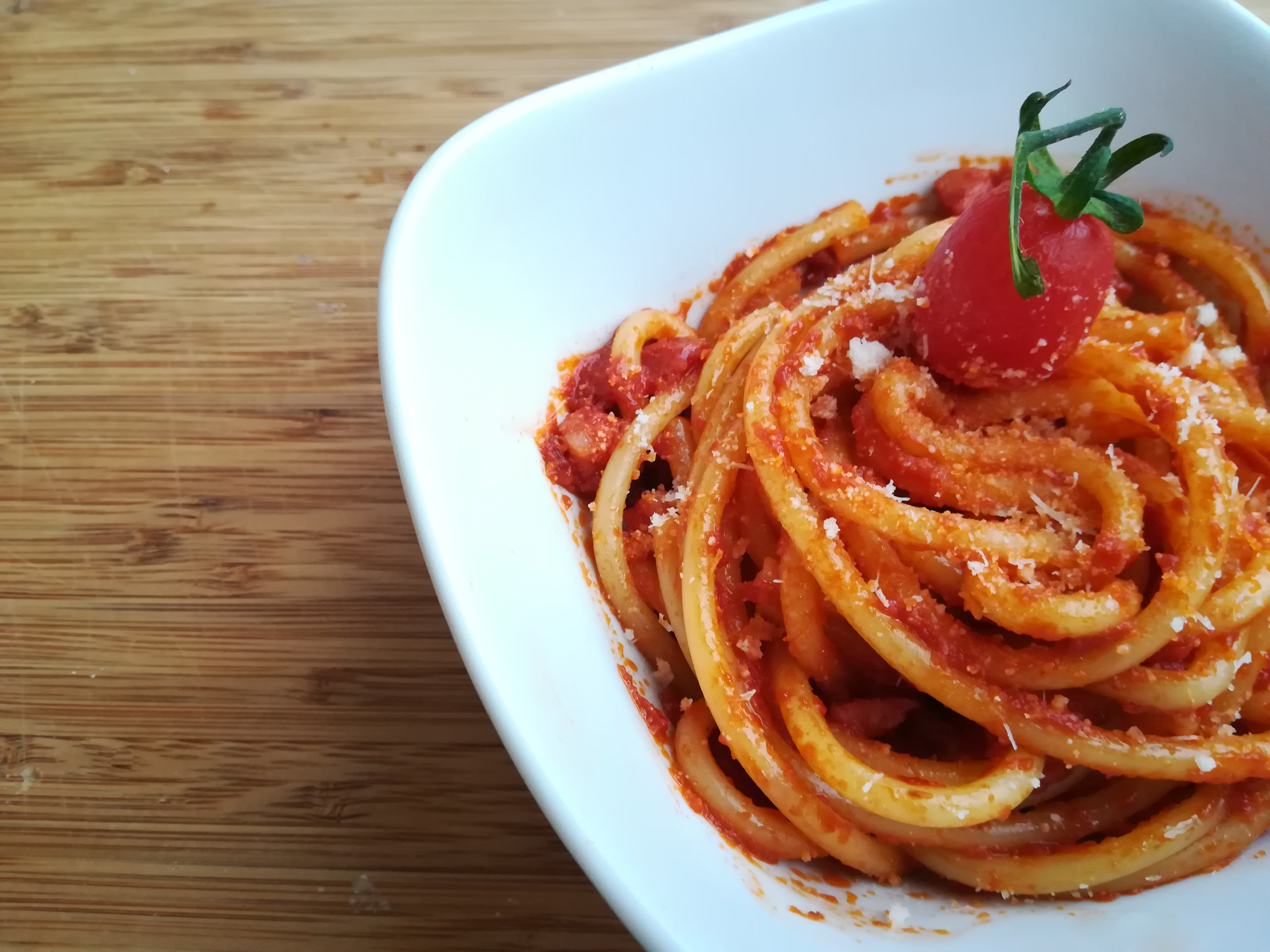
Amatriciana

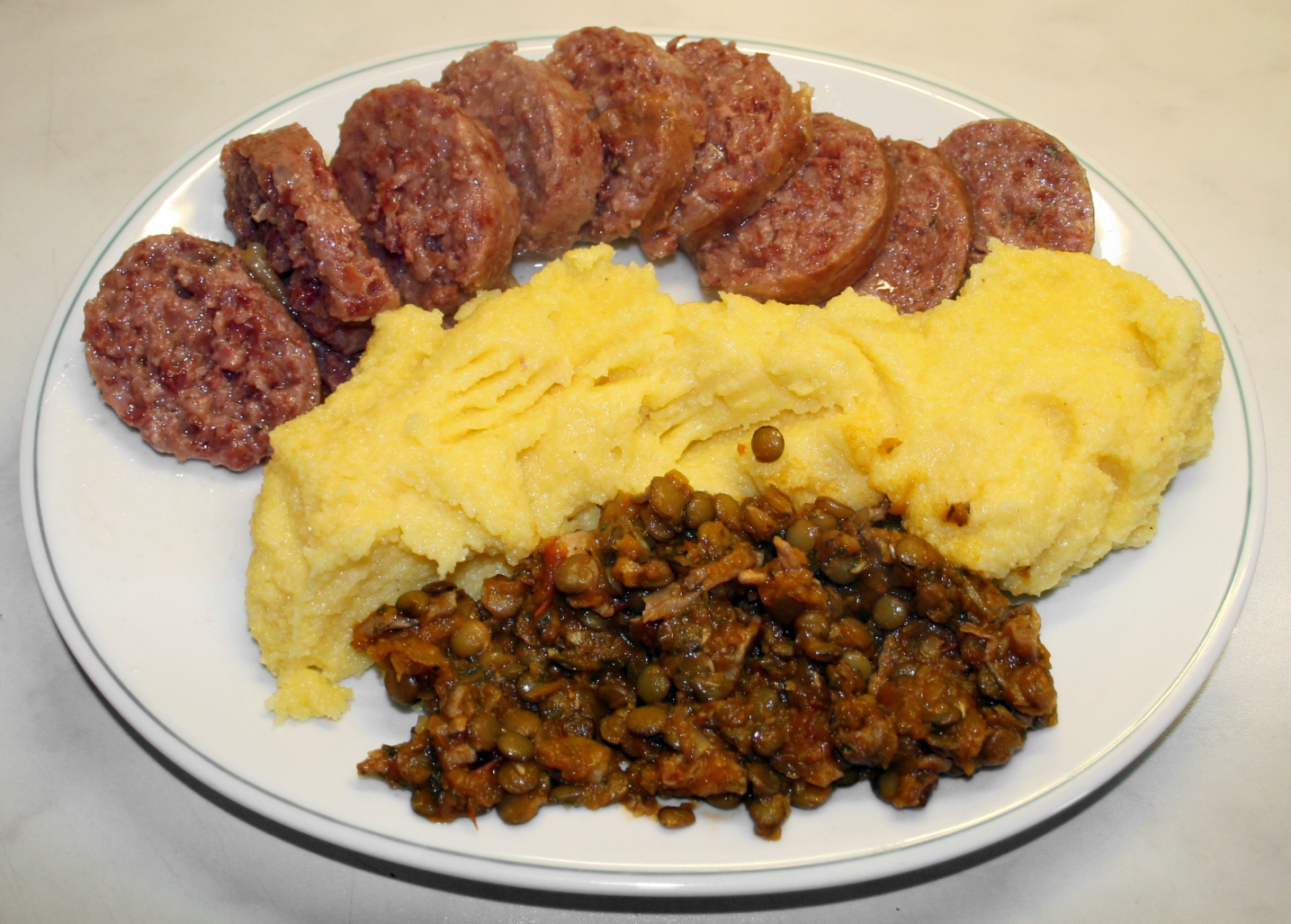
Cotechino, polenta and lentils

- Abbacchio
- Affogato
- Arancini
- Asiago
- Biscotti
- Braciola
- Bruschetta
- Caciotta
- Cacciucco
- Caponata
- Cappuccino
- Cotechino
- Crostata
- Crostini
- Espresso
- Focaccia
- Frittata
- Frittella
- Fritto misto
- Gelato
- Lasagna
- Mascarpone
- Minestrone
- Mozzarella
- Panettone
- Panna cotta
- Panino
- Panzerotto
- Parmigiano Reggiano
- Pasta
- Pecorino
- Peperonata
- Pizza
- Polenta
- Porchetta
- Prosciutto
- Ravioli
- Risotto
- Salami
- Salumi
- Scamorza
- Semifreddo
- Spezzatino
- Strudel
- Tiramisu
- Tortellini
- Zabaione
- Zuppa inglese

==== By designation of origin ====
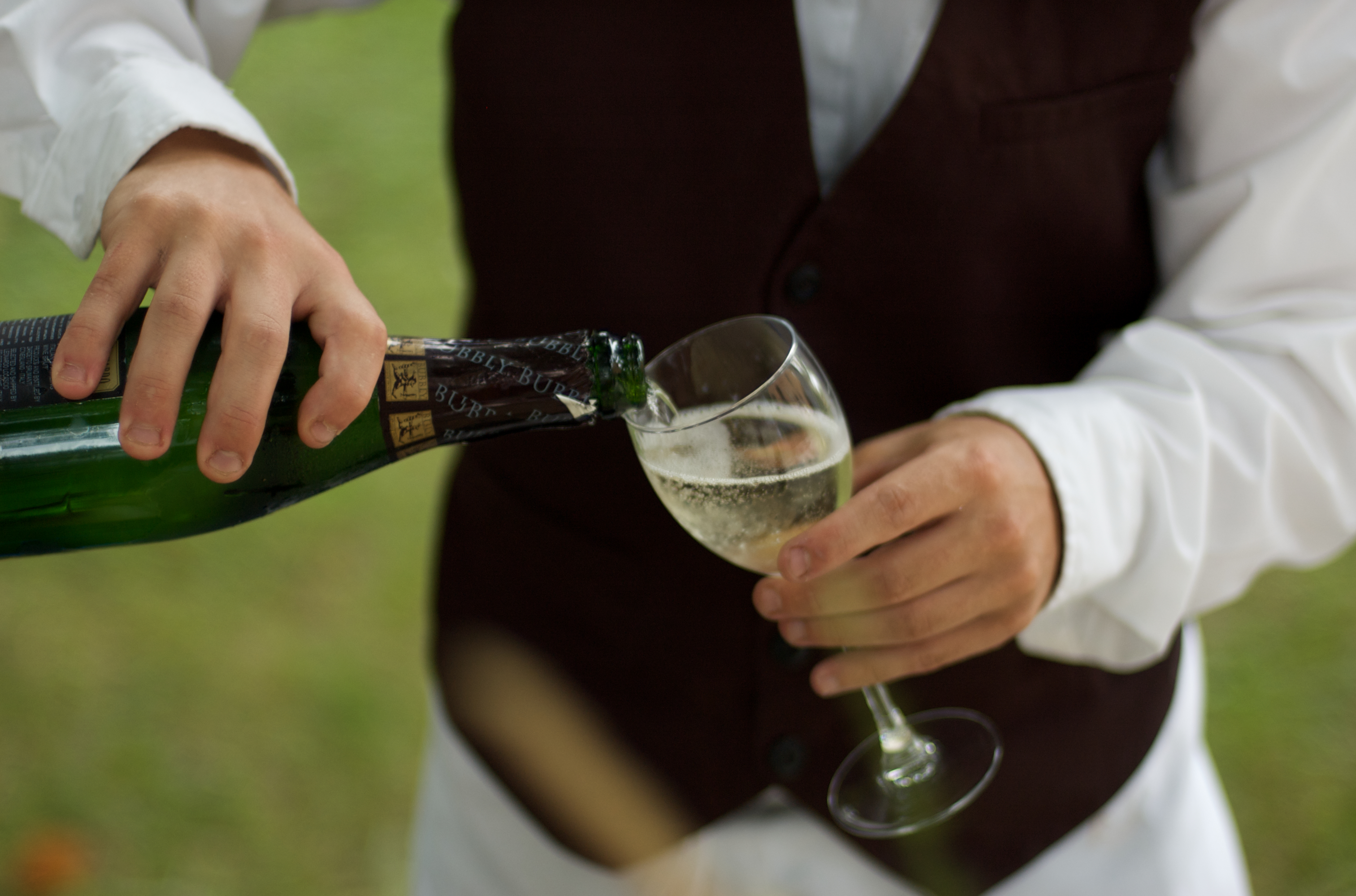
Waiter pouring Prosecco

- Denominazione di origine controllata – a quality assurance label for Italian food products, especially Italian wine and cheese
  - List of Italian DOC wines
  - List of Italian DOCG wines
- Indicazione geografica tipica
- Prodotti agroalimentari tradizionali is an official approval for traditional Italian regional food products similar to the Protected Geographical Status of the European Union.
- Strada dell'Olio – a kind of gastronomical route in Italy that crosses a territory rich of traditional products, PDOs and PGIs, DOCs and DOCGs in Italy.

=== Japan ===
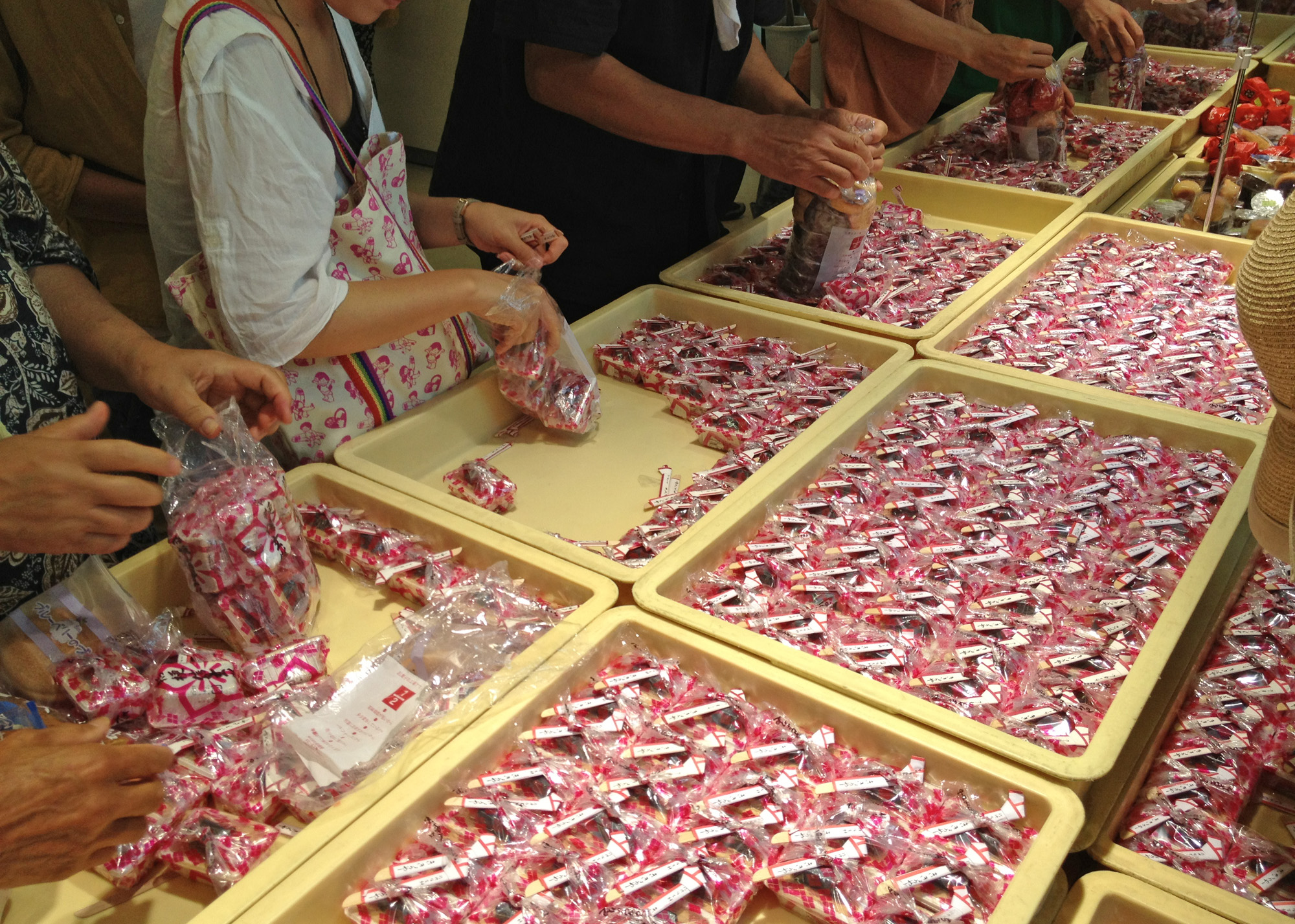
Mochi for sale at a Japanese mall.

- Mochi – eaten year-round in Japan, mochi is a traditional food for the Japanese New Year and is commonly sold and eaten during that time

=== Jordan ===
Traditional beverages in Jordan include sous (also referred to as 'irqsus), a drink prepared using the dried root of Glycyrrhiza glabra (liquorice), tamr hindi, a drink prepared from an infusion of the dried pulp of Tamarindus indica (tamarind), and laban (labneh), a drink prepared with yogurt and water. A significant amount of labneh in Jordan and nearby countries continues to be prepared using the traditional method of "straining set yogurt in cloth bags".

=== Korea ===
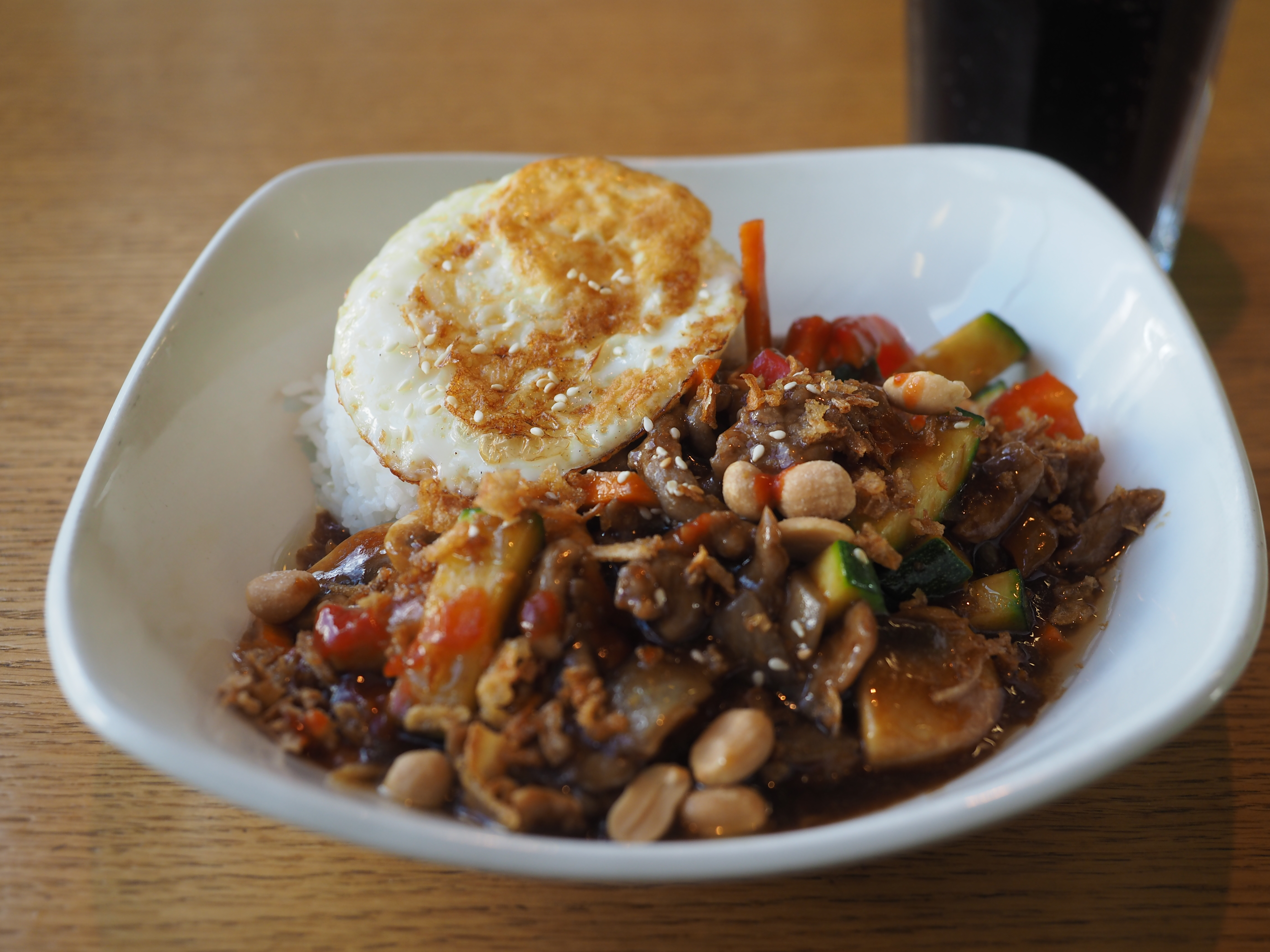
Bibimbap

- Bibimbap
- Bulgogi
- Kimchi
- Nurungji
- Sungnyung

=== Latvia ===
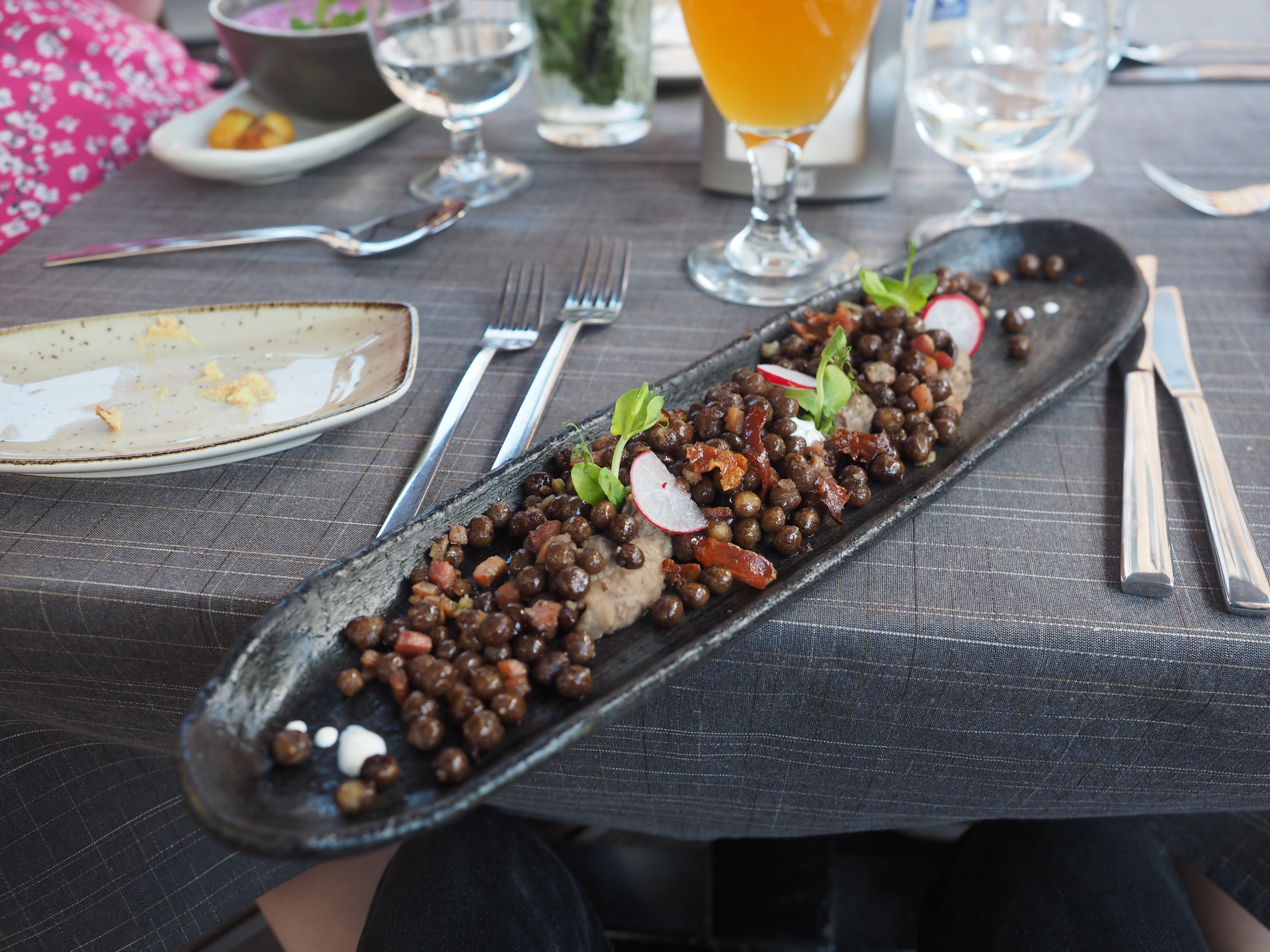
Grey peas with bacon and radish.

- Grey peas
- Layered rye bread
- Sklandrausis
- Speķrauši

=== Lithuania ===
- Cepelinai

=== Malaysia ===
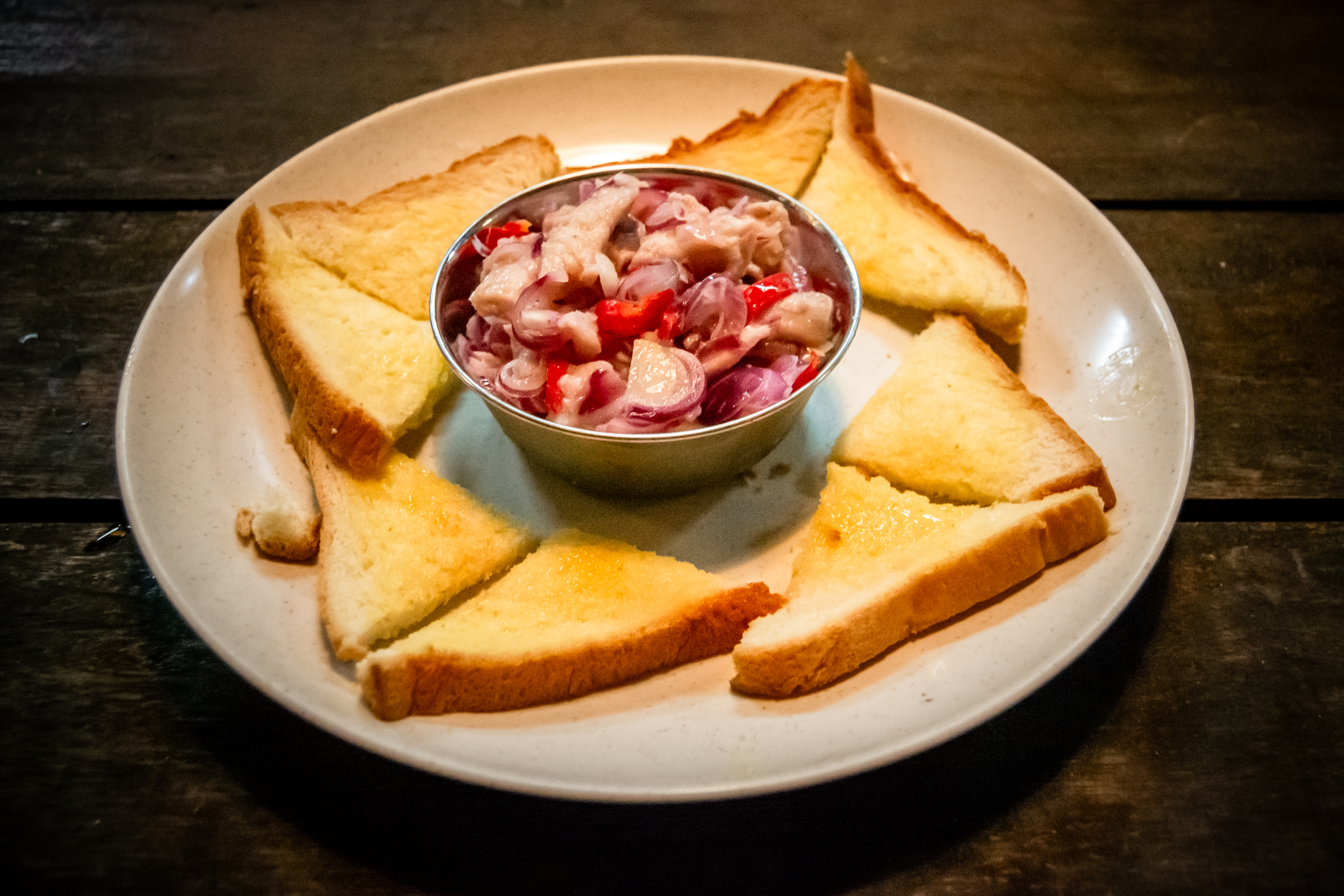
A swordfish hinava served with sandwich bread

- Hinava
- Kelupis
- Ketupat
- Lamban
- Lemang
- Linopot
- Manuk pansuh
- Nasi lemak
- Penyaram
- Umai

=== Maldives ===
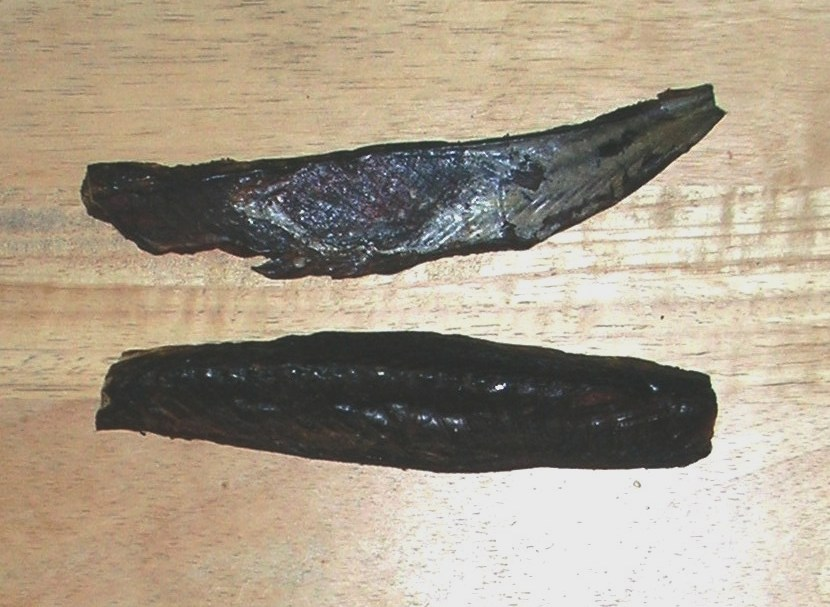
Two pieces (ari) of industrially-produced Maldive fish

- Garudiya (Note: "Food in the Maldives may be thought of in three categories: the traditional fare, Sri Lanka cuisine, and the newer imported foods. The traditional fare is mostly fish boiled in a broth called Gaudiya, and coconut pieces ...")
- Maldives fish – cured tuna fish traditionally produced in the Maldives. It is a staple food in Maldivian cuisine

=== Malta ===
- Lent in Malta § Traditional food eaten throughout the period
  - Kwareżimal – Lent cake

=== Mexico ===
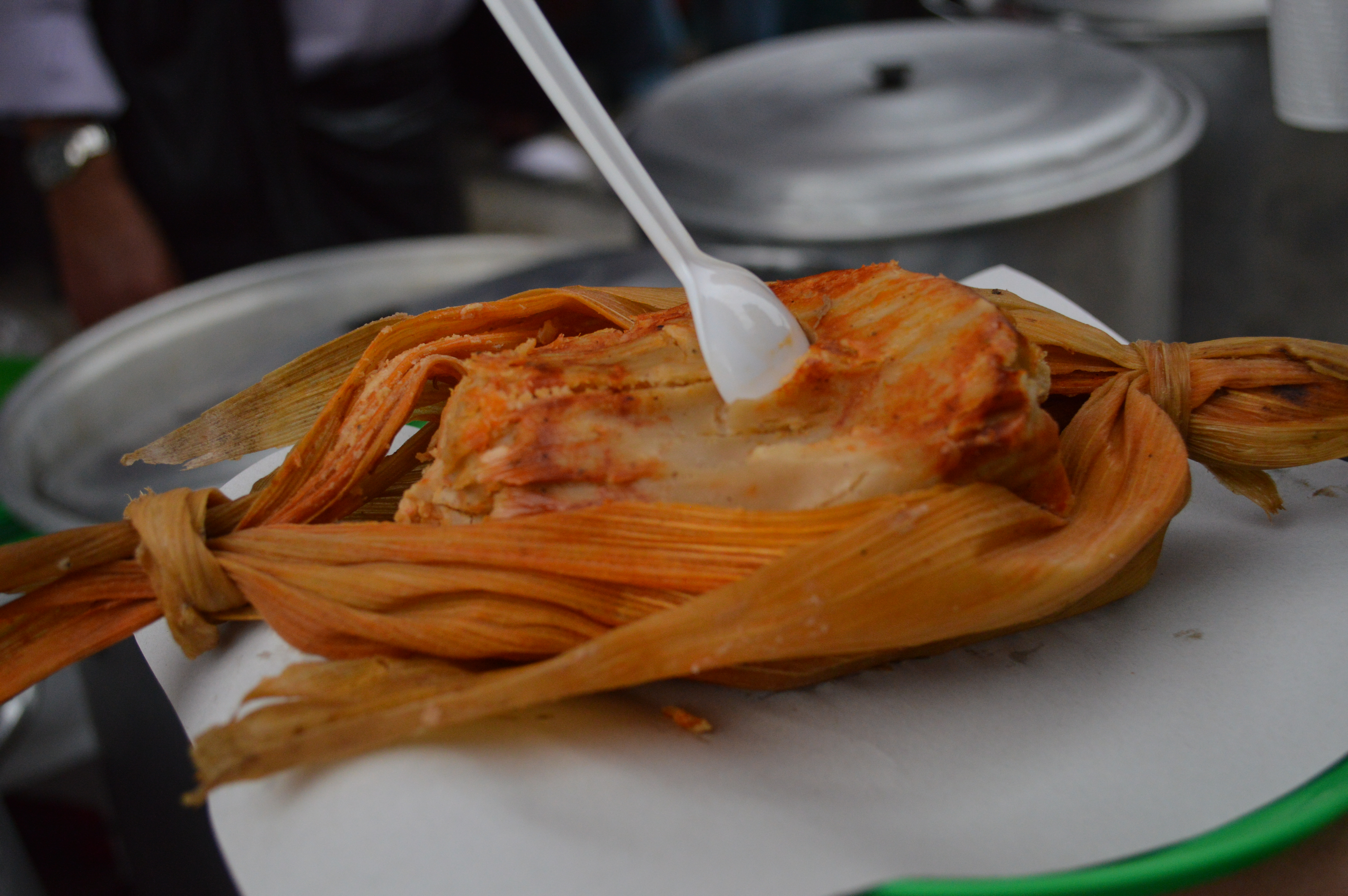
A tamale

- Atole
- Capirotada – usually eaten during the Lenten period (comida de cuaresma). It is one of the dishes served on Good Friday.
- Chiles
- Enchilada
- Iguana meat
- Legumes, beans and refried beans
- Maize
  - Tortilla
- Mole sauce
- Pork
  - Chorizo
- Rice – traditionally pan fried to a golden color before cooking
- Rice and beans
- Sope
- Tamale

=== Nepal ===
- Dhindo

=== Portugal ===
- Denominação de Origem Controlada is the system of protected designation of origin for wines, cheeses, butter, and other agricultural products from Portugal.

=== Saudi Arabia ===
- Hininy
- Kabsa

=== Singapore ===
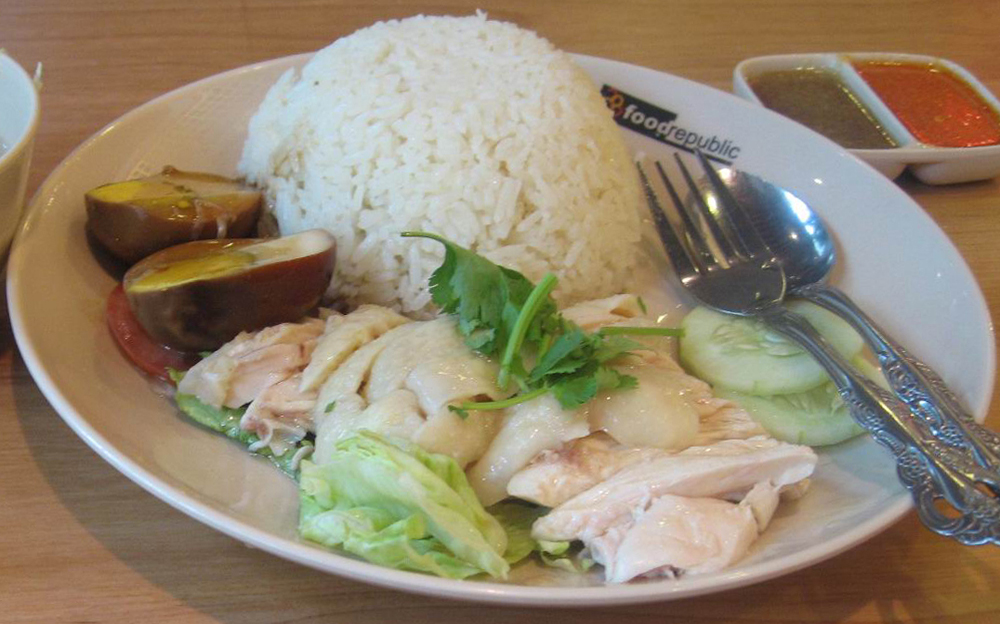
Hainanese chicken rice

- Hainanese chicken rice – considered as a national dish of Singapore
- Teochew porridge

=== Slovakia ===
- Bryndzové halušky – a national dish of Slovakia consisting of halušky and bryndza.
- Lecsó

=== South Africa ===
- Bobotie
- Bunny chow
- Chakalaka and Pap
- Malva pudding
- Potjiekos
- Samosa

=== Spain ===
- Boroña – a cornbread that is a traditional food in the regions of Galicia, Asturias, Cantabria, the Basque Country and northern Castilla-Leon (areas of León, Palencia and Burgos)
- Denominación de Origen – part of a regulatory classification system primarily for Spanish wines (similar to the French appellations) but also for other foodstuffs like cheeses, condiments, honey and meats, among others

=== Sweden ===
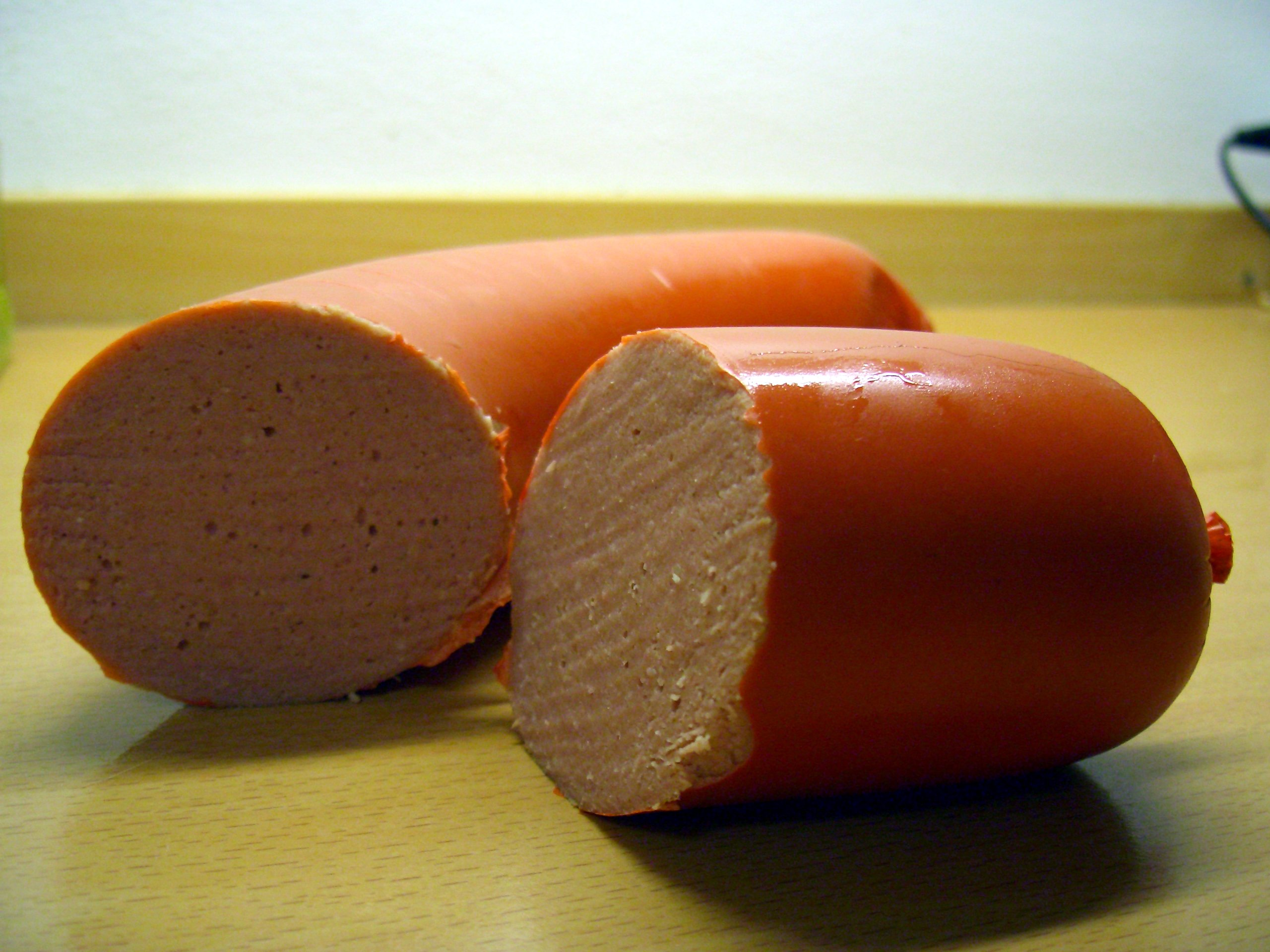
Swedish falukorv sausage, split in half.

- Falukorv
- Janssons frestelse
- Pyttipanna

=== Switzerland ===
- Appellation d'origine protégée – A Swiss geographical indication protecting the origin and the quality of traditional food products other than wines
- Capuns – a traditional food from the canton of Graubünden in Switzerland

=== Tanzania ===
- Pare people § Traditional food

=== Thailand ===
- Mango sticky rice
- Pad Thai

=== Turkey ===
- İmam bayıldı

=== Uganda ===
- Malewa – smoked bamboo shoot which is dried for preservation. The food originated from Eastern Uganda in the Bugisu sub-region

=== United Kingdom ===
==== England ====
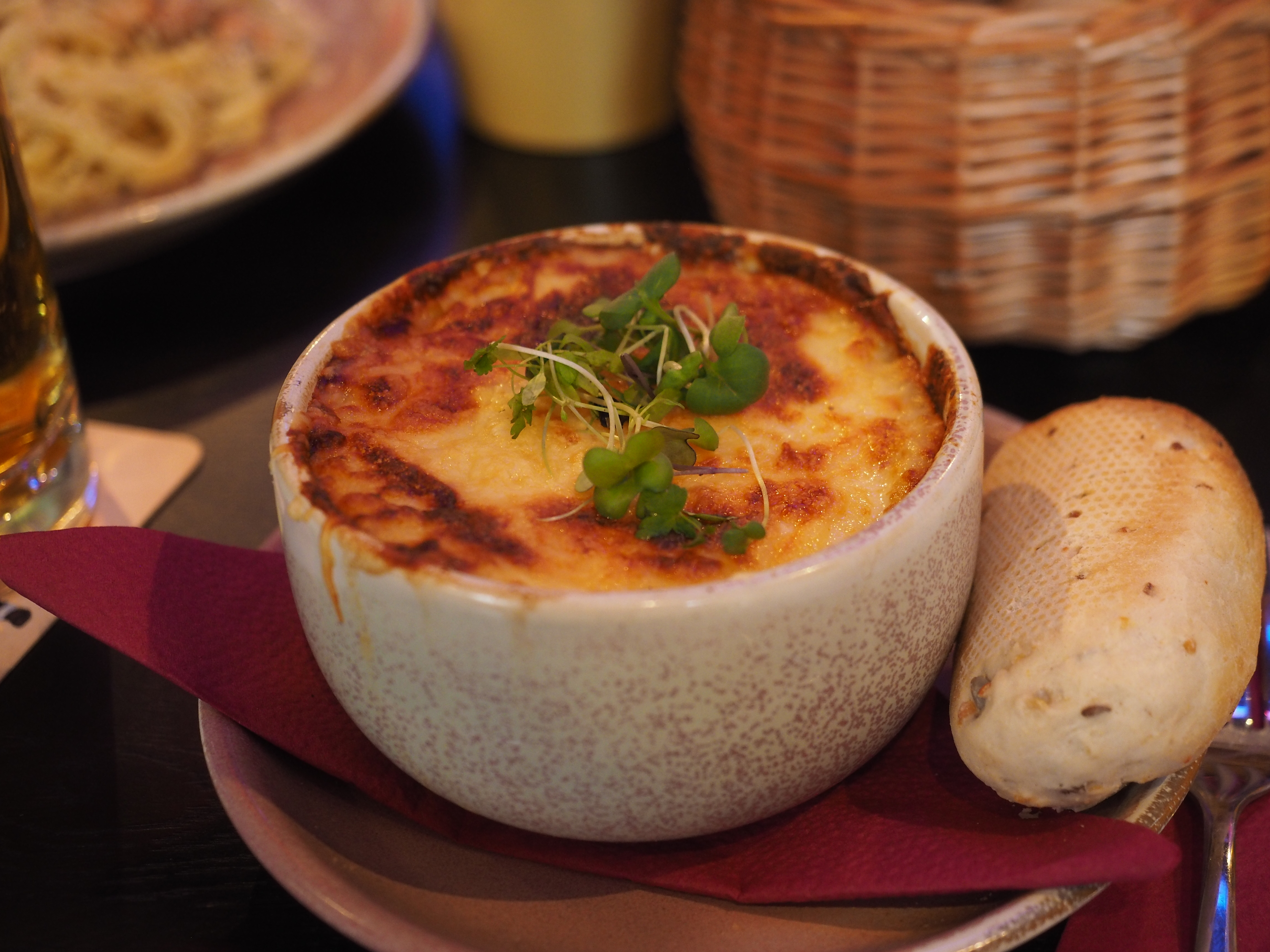
Cottage pie

- Bangers and mash
- Cottage pie
- Faggot
- Fish and chips (Note: "England's best-known traditional dish is fish and chips ...")
- Full breakfast
- Sunday roast (Note: "... the Sunday roast; the tradition is continued every Sunday lunchtime in pubs and restaurants across England.")

==== Wales ====
- Cawl
- Welsh cakes
- Glamorgan sausages
- Laverbread
- Welsh rarebit
- Bara brith

==== Scotland ====
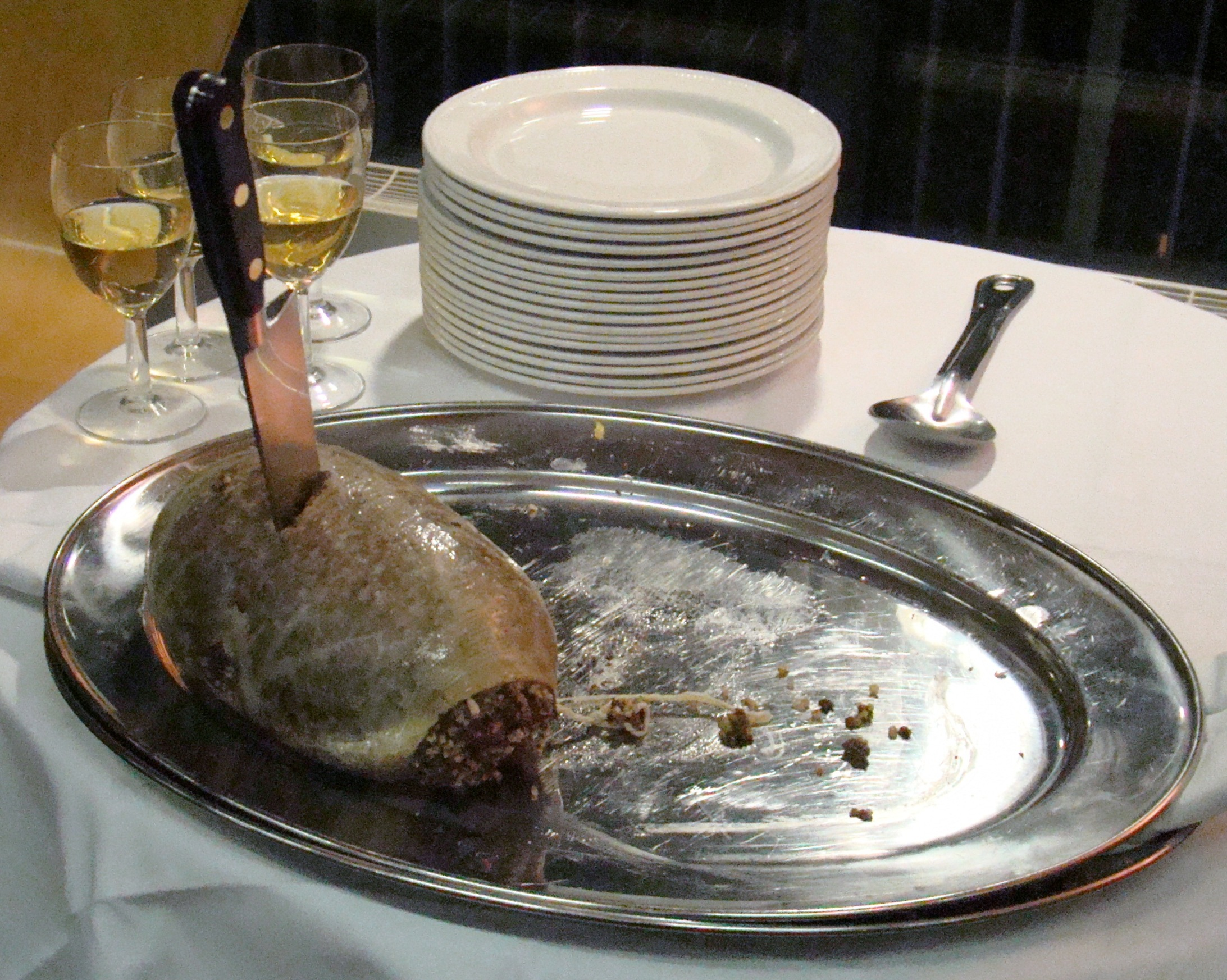
Haggis on a platter at a Burns supper.

- Haggis
- Lorne sausage
- Neeps and tatties
- Cullen skink
- Arbroath smokies
- Reestit mutton

=== United States ===
- Cardamom bread – considered as a traditional food among Swedish Americans
- Thanksgiving dinner
- Hotdish

==== Southern United States ====
- Biscuit
- Cheese straw
- Cornbread
- Collard greens
- Hoppin' John
- Sweet potato

=== Vanuatu ===
- Laplap – a national dish

=== Yemen ===
- Kabsa

== By region ==
=== Arab states of the Persian Gulf ===
- Khabees – traditional sweet dish in the Arab states of the Persian Gulf

=== Commonwealth Caribbean ===
- Rice and peas – a traditional dish in the Anglo-Caribbean

=== Levant (Eastern Mediterranean) ===
Traditional foods of the Levant include falafel, fuul, halawa, hummus, kanafeh, labaneh, medammis and tahini. among others. The most popular traditional foods in the region are those prepared from legumes, specifically, falafel, fuul, hummus and medammis.

Popular traditional foods in the Eastern Mediterranean region

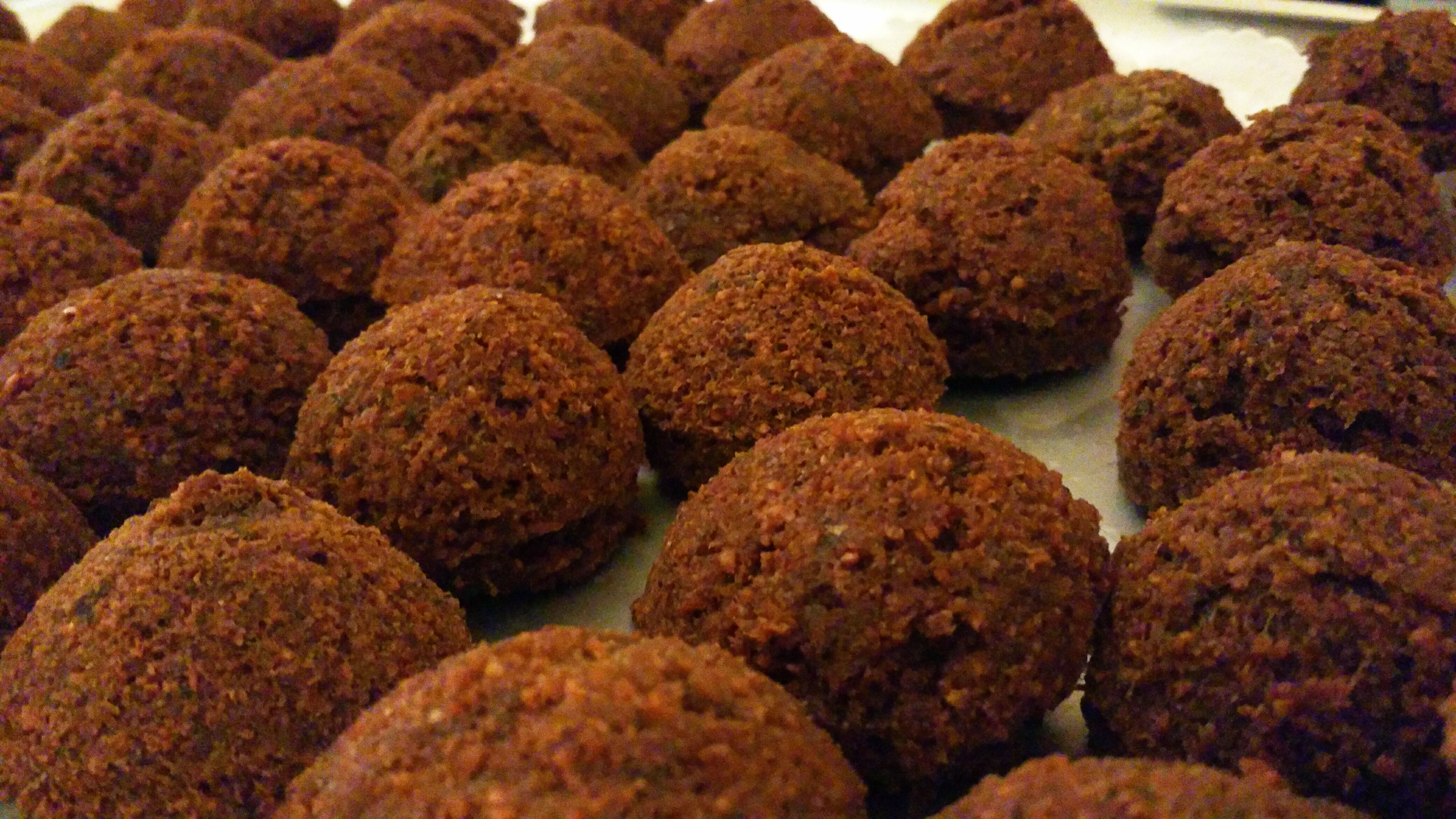
Falafel

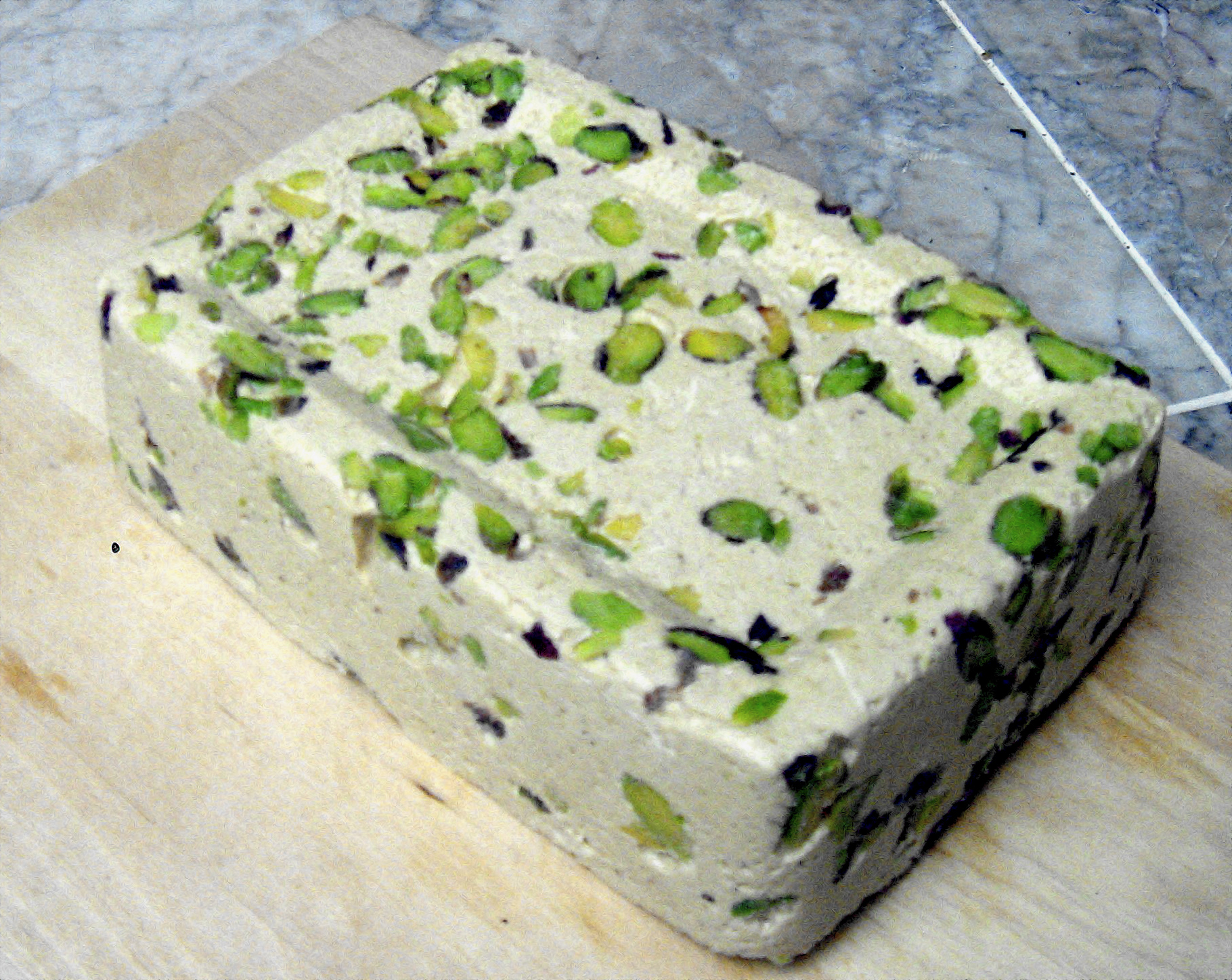
Halawa prepared with tahini and pistachio nuts

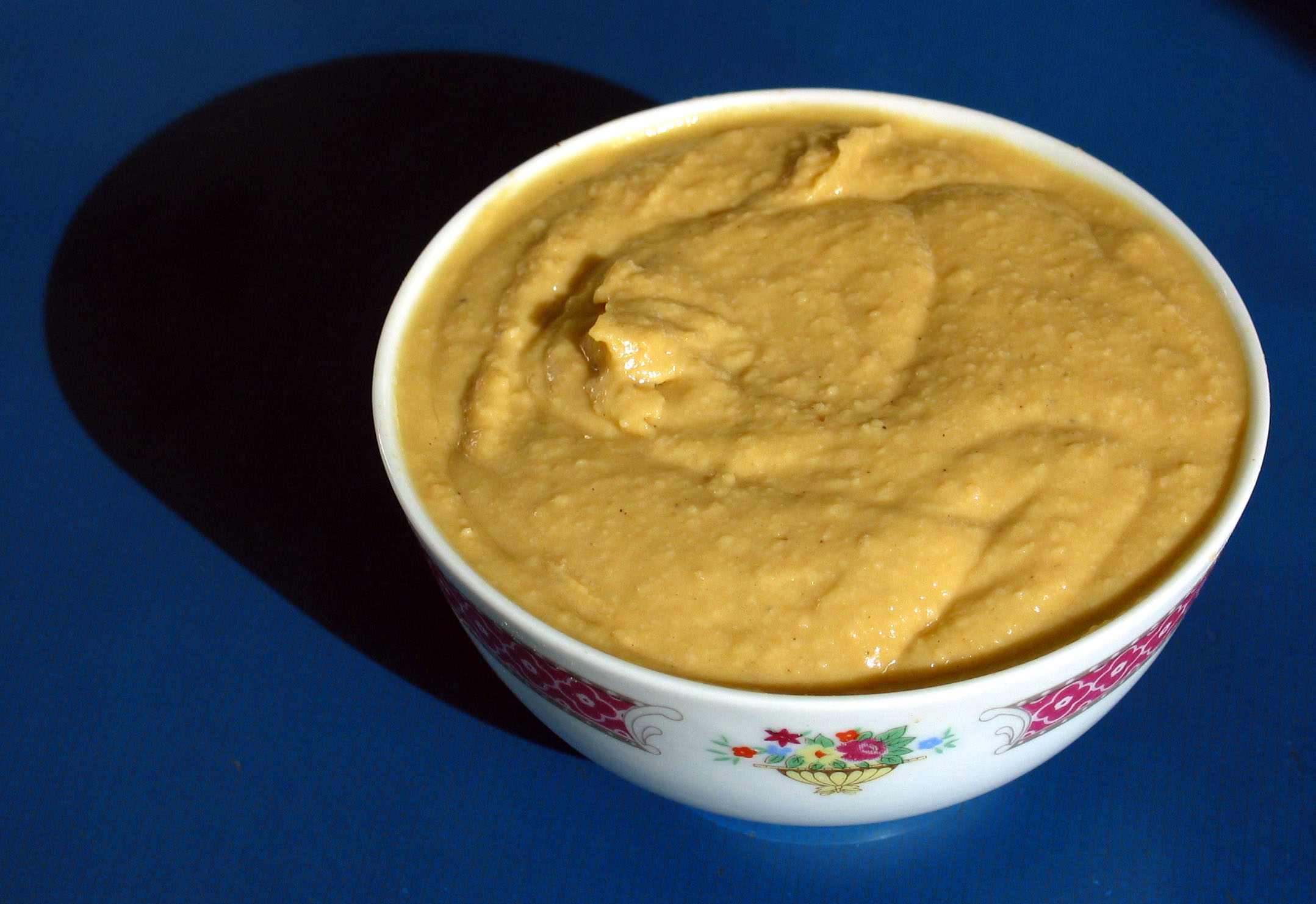
Hummus

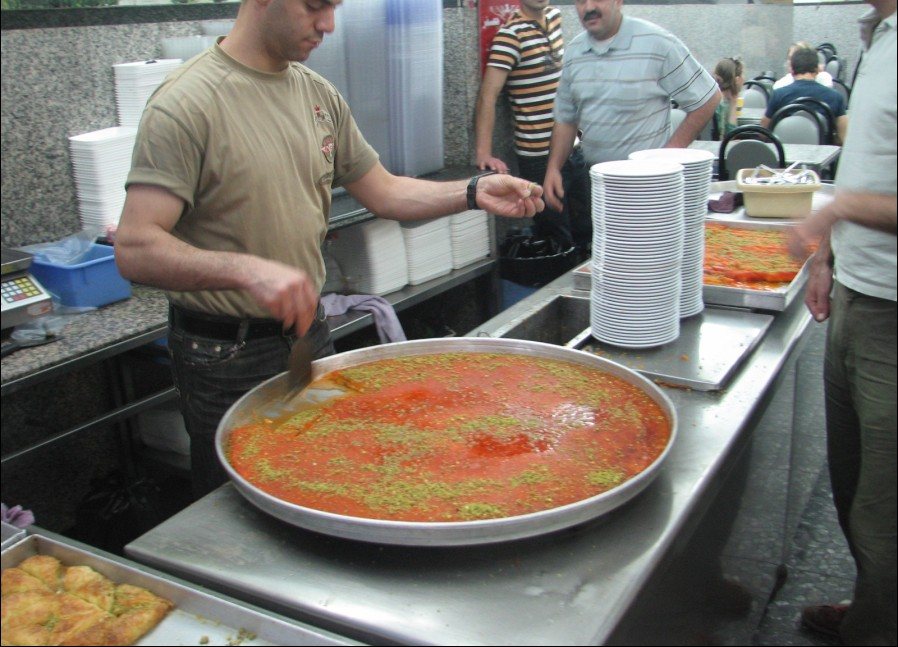
Kanafeh in Israel

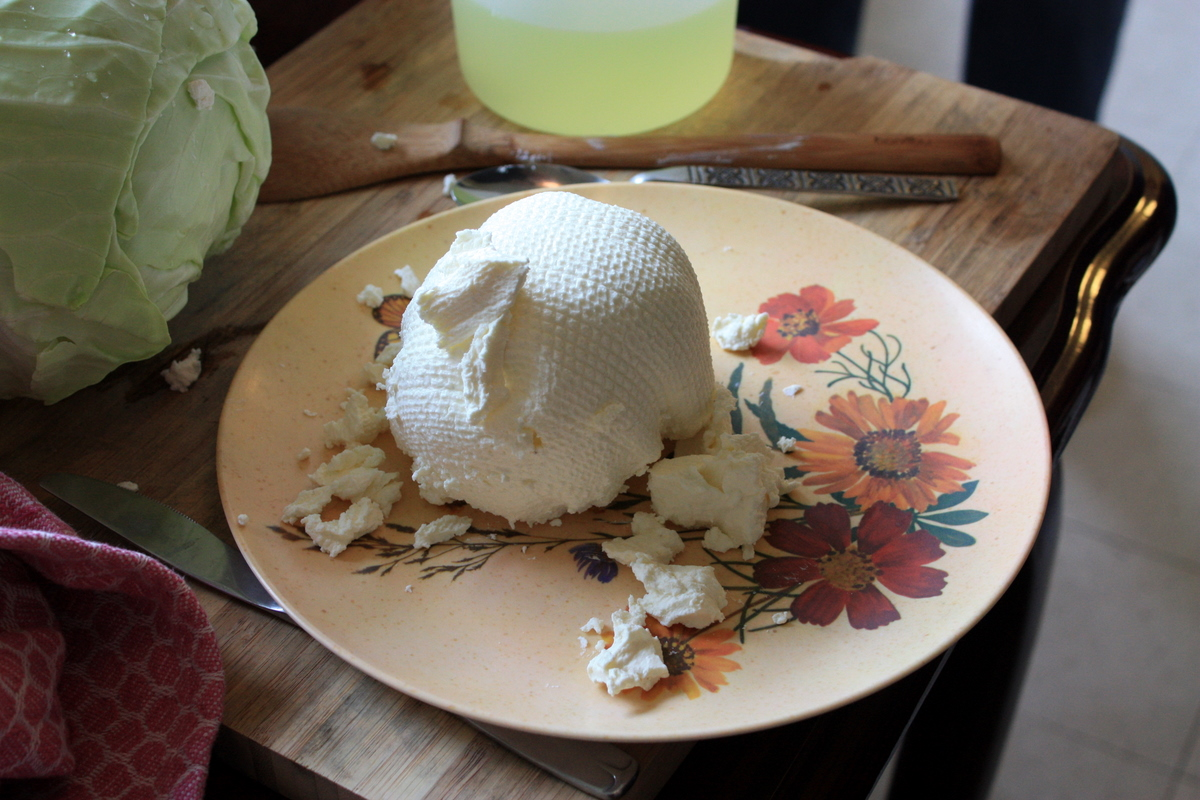
Labaneh

=== European Union ===
- Geographical indications and traditional specialties in the European Union
- Quality Wines Produced in Specified Regions – a quality indicator used within European Union wine regulations that identifies wines with protected geographical indications
- List of geographical designations for spirit drinks in the European Union

=== Scandinavia ===
- European crayfish
  - Crayfish party

=== Southern Africa ===
- Soured milk – traditional food of the Bantu peoples of Southern Africa

== See also ==
- Christmas dinner
- Appellation
- Shrove Tuesday – known in some countries as Pancake Tuesday or Pancake day
- Whole food
