= Hininy =

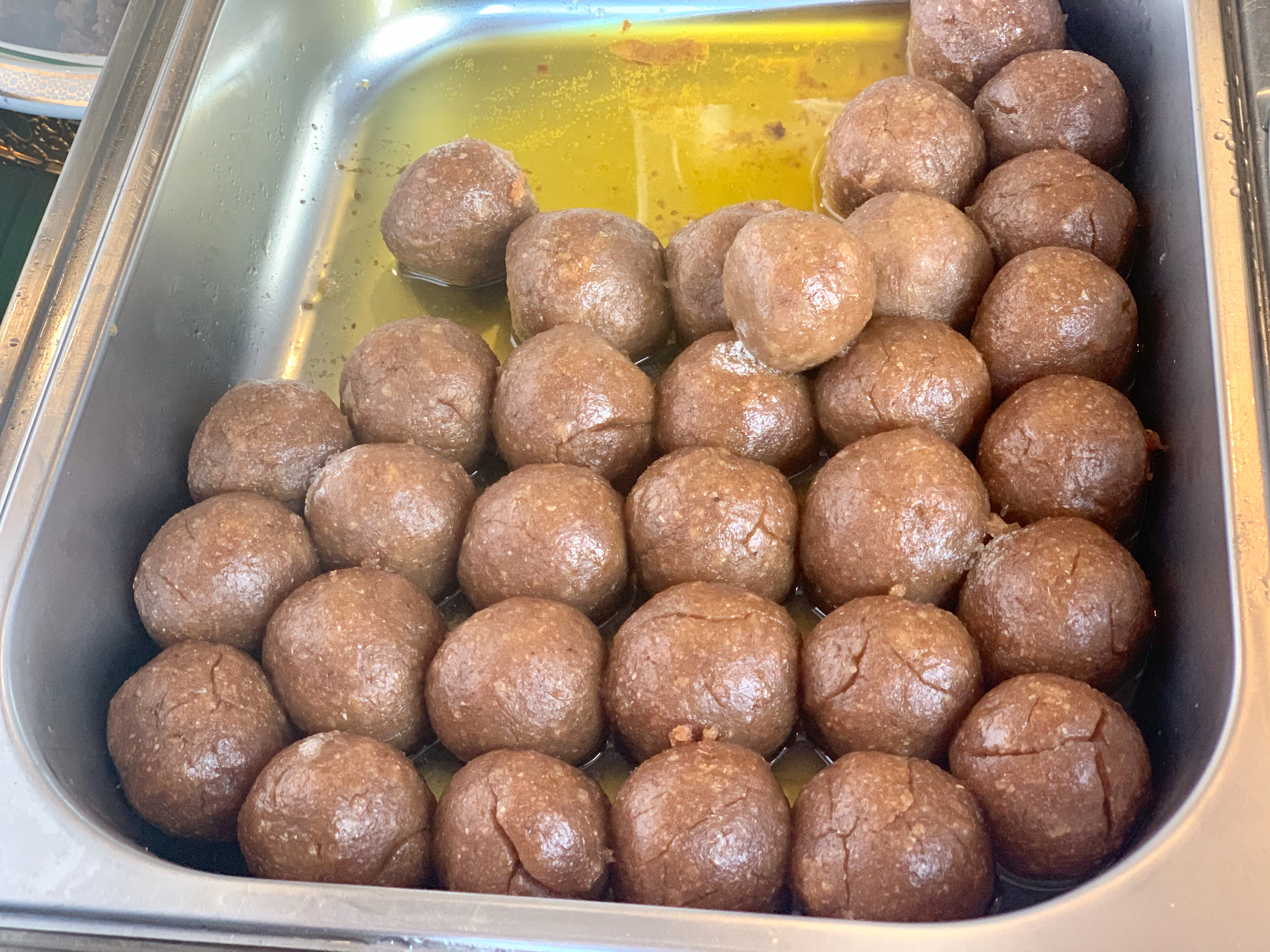
Hininy

Hininy (Arabic: حنيني) is a traditional food in Saudi Arabia, especially in Najd. It is usually prepared in winter. It is made from dates, brown bread, ghee, cardamom and saffron.
