= Cheese straw =

Cheese-based dish

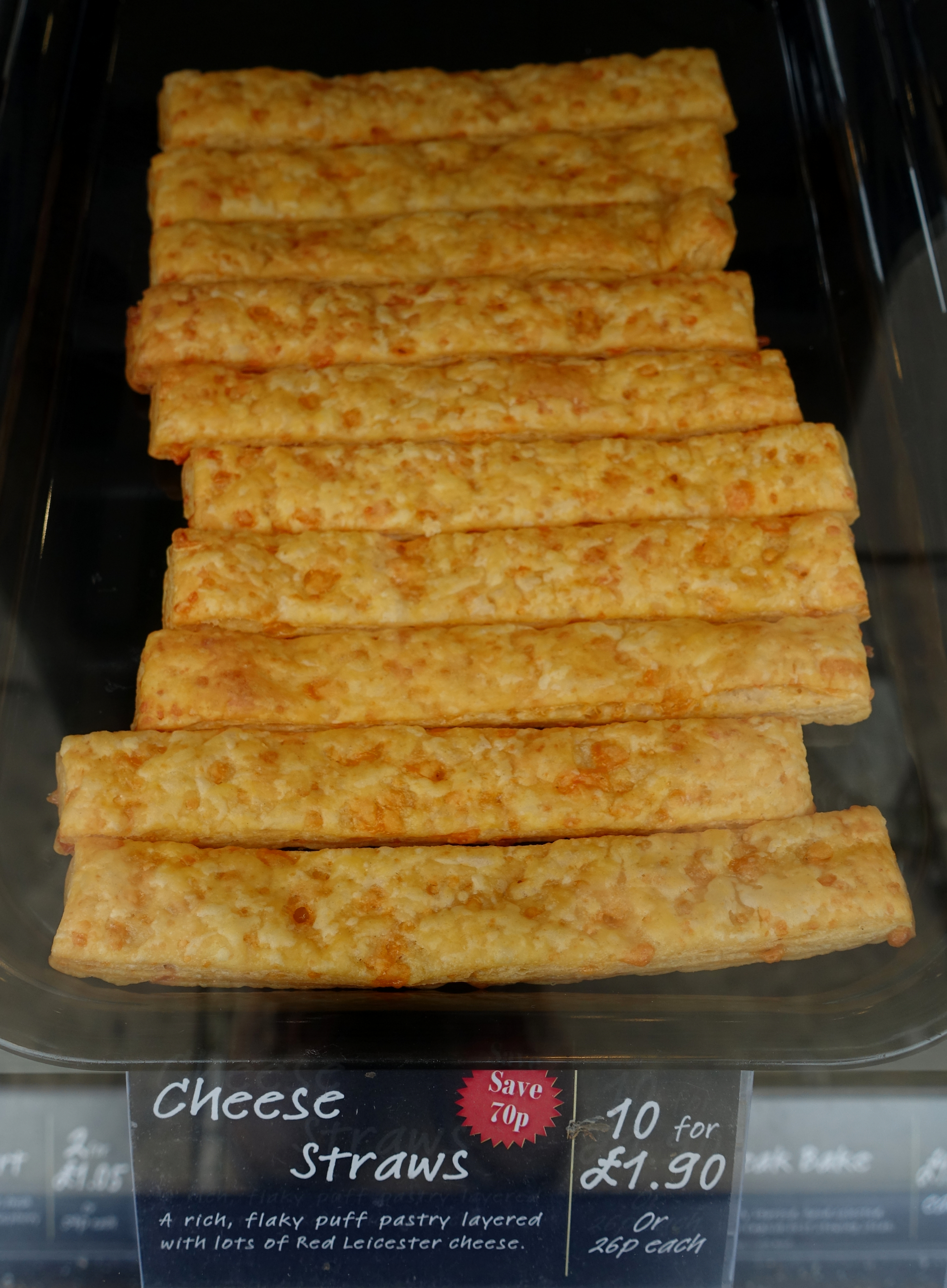

Cheese straws are a traditional food of England and the Southern United States. They are made as cut strips, or by using a cookie press, from dough made with butter, flour, salt, cheddar cheese and cayenne pepper. Variations use different types of cheese, spices and nuts. They are eaten as an appetizer or snack.

An early recipe for cheese straws was named "cayenne cheese fingers" in Mrs. Beeton's Book of Household Management.
