= Tsamarella =

Traditional lunch meat in Cyprus

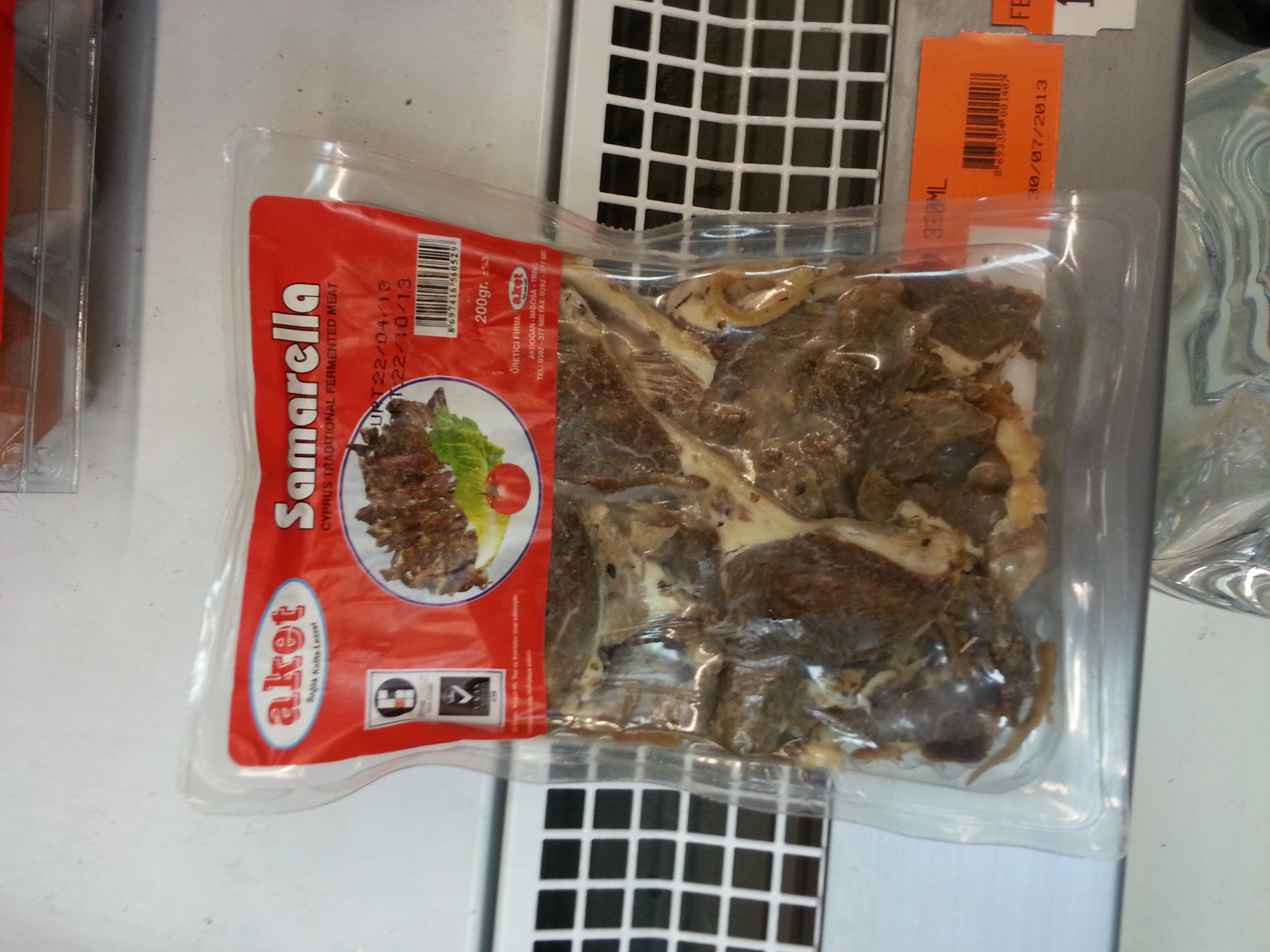
Tsamarella

Tsamarella (Greek: τσαμαρέλλα, Turkish: samarella) is a traditional food and one of Cyprus' main lunch meats, common in both Greek Cypriot and Turkish Cypriot communities.

== Preparation ==
It consists usually of goat's meat; the whole animal without its bones, that is salted and cured for preservation. The process of preparation traditionally involves drying in the sun for few days. After that, the meat was placed in boiled water and a condiment (usually oregano) was added. The producers then put it again in the sun for one more day. Tsamarella is soft, has salty taste and it is served with alcoholic beverages (wine, zivania etc.) as a meze.

== Historical facts ==
Like the vast majority of Cyprus' dried meats (lountza, loukaniko, apohtin, zalatina etc.), tsamarella is a traditional product of Marathasa Valley, Pitsilia and Pafos' agricultural areas. Moreover, in the past it was placed in special wooden lockers and it was used as a way to maintain food.

== See also ==
- Jerky
- List of dried foods
- List of goat dishes
