= Boroña =

Spanish bread made with corn

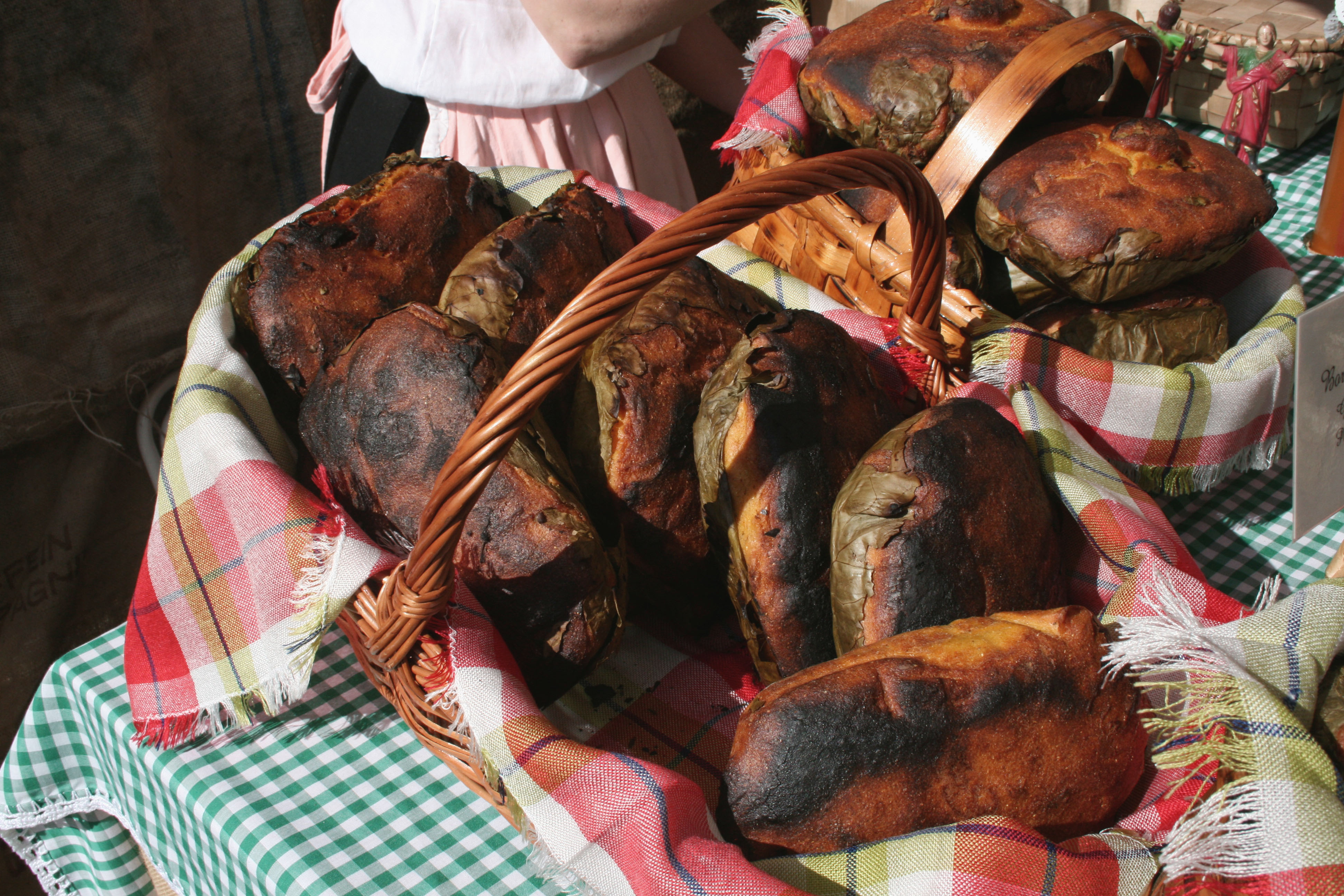
Boroña (Asturian)

Boroña is a type of bread made with corn in northern Spain. This cornbread (Galician: broa or boroa in Asturian: boroña in Cantabria: cornbread, of Celtic origin, compare Welsh and Breton baran bread) is a bread made with cornmeal. It is a traditional food from the regions of Galicia, Asturias, Cantabria, the Basque Country and northern Castilla-Leon (areas of León, Palencia and Burgos), Spain. It has been widely used in rural areas until the mid twentieth century. It is usually cooked in an oven wrapped in cabbage leaves.

In Cantabria, by extension, it is called borona, the corn plant bread, and is called "flour corn bread" flour.

== History ==
Before corn reached the Iberian Peninsula from the American continent, there and was a type of cornbread, a mixed bread made from barley and rye [0] which was eaten in northern Spain, as shown by the calf of the behetrías Castile, the fourteenth century, [1] as follows Cantabrians documents stating in the fifteenth century. [2]

After the arrival of the Spaniards to the New World in 1492, was still called borona for breads made with millet that the authors of the time attributed to the Basques, [3] although that bread had been consumed in more northern sites.

The term borona reappears in 1619 in the town of Oseja Sajambre, located in the Picos de Europa, in a context that suggests it was about corn bread, [4] so this would be the reference historically oldest known so far, the cornbread as we understand it today.

In 1794 Jovellanos speaks of "cornbread or cornbread" that was eaten in the Principality of Asturias in the Report of the Economic Society of Madrid.

== Features ==
The mixture of wheat flour (spelled [spelt?] flour) and corn (2/3 corn flour and other wheat flour) makes the interior color of cornbread a pale yellow. The dough mass is usually put into a mold. It can be rectangular, though now usually toroidal shape. The traditional recipe includes in the dough some slices of chorizo and various meats including prime rib ('costiella'). The dough goes with the mold in an oven and cooked at relatively low temperatures overnight.

== Serve ==
To serve cornbread opens in half and the meat content inside to be eaten with bread dough baked rolls over.
