= Apohtin =

- Course: Appetizer (meze)
- Place of origin: Cyprus
- Main ingredients: Goat Meat
- Similar dishes: Tsamarella

Apohtin or apohti (Greek: απόχτιν) is a traditional Cypriot dried food made by salting goat meat.

== History ==
Apohtin's roots are traced during the Byzantine period as various texts refer to the preparation of meat; goat meat, beef, pork etc., that was salted and then dried in the sun.

== Preparation ==
In order to prepare apohtin, the animal is opened in the middle. Its head, intestines and tallow are removed. Then the meat is washed, salted and left in the sun for a period of three to four weeks in order to dry. This is done in a manner that protects the meat from threats that could harm its quality, such as insects. After that period, the meat is sliced into small pieces, washed again and becomes available for any type of cooking. In Cyprus, apohtin is a common meze that is served with alcoholic beverages (wine, zivania etc.).

A food similar to apohtin is noted in Santorini under the same name. That kind of apohti refers to a food based in pork tenderloin that is salted and dried in the sun. Also, the preparation of tsamarella, another Cypriot dish, is similar to apohtin's preparation except from the fact that unlike apohtin, in tsamarella, the animal's bones are removed from the beginning.

== See also ==
- List of dried foods
