= Grey peas =

Latvian food

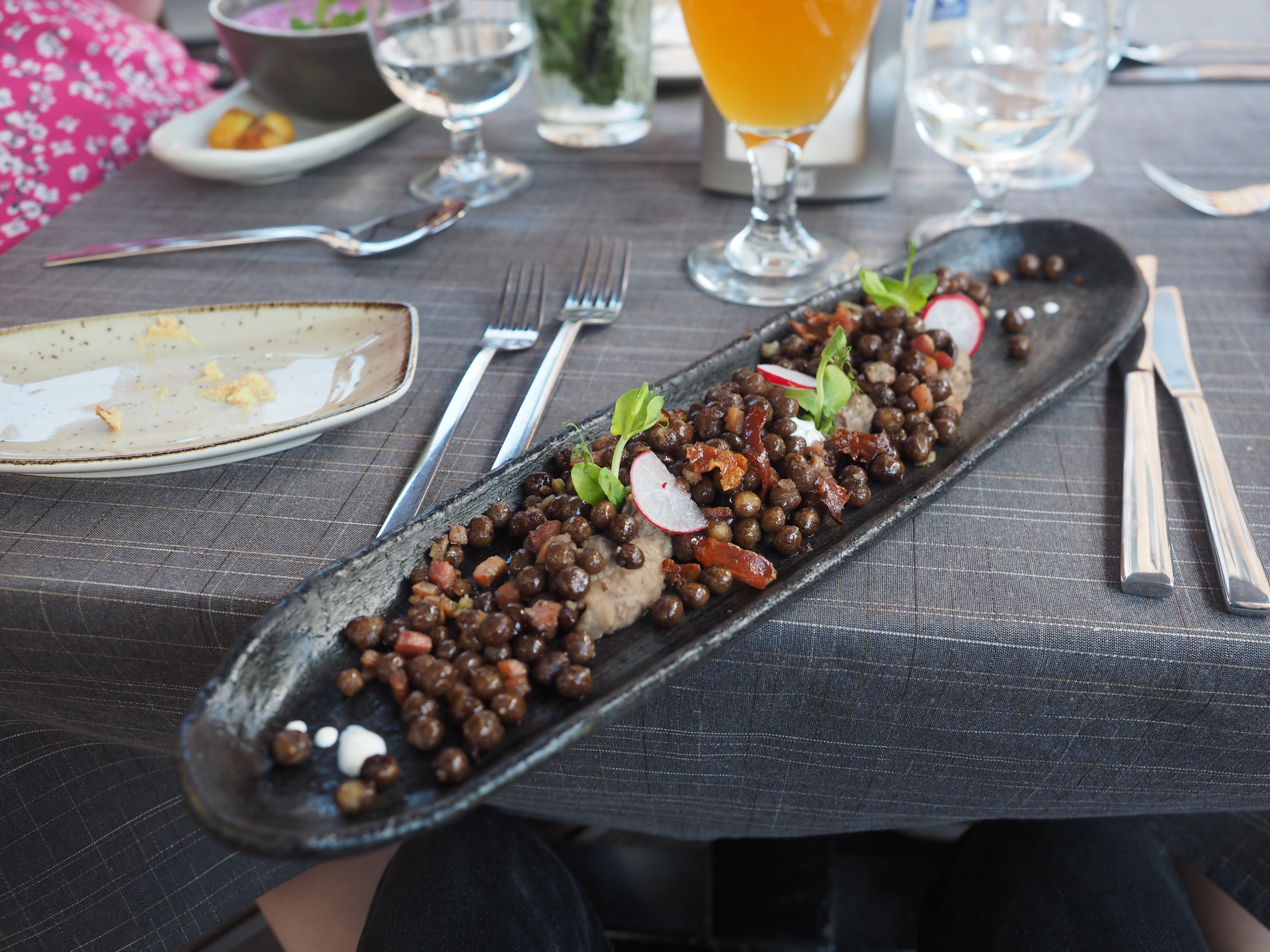
Grey peas with bacon and radish at a restaurant in Riga.

Grey peas (Latvian: Pelēkie zirņi) is a popular Latvian cuisine snack made from large grey peas. It is a traditional Christmas dish in Latvia.

Grey peas also survive as a tradition meal in parts of Britain. For example, grey peas and bacon are commonly available in the Black Country region, and black peas are traditional winter food in Lancashire.

== History ==
Latvians have been eating peas for hundreds of years. Peas, along with barley and beans, were one of the main dishes of the early centuries, and they remained important until the beginning of the potato era in the 19th century. Nowadays, grey peas with bacon are offered in travel guides as a special Latvian dish worth tasting.

Ground peas, also called pelus, are known in Lithuania as grey peas, the seeds of which are brown. They have been grown in Europe since the Neolithic. Now gardeners grow only garden peas on their plots for food, the seeds of which are white-yellowish or greenish in colour, and the same green immature peas that are eaten fresh, dried or canned. The latter were brought out relatively late, in the 17th century. In the beginning, they were introduced to the peasants' table even later until they finally became popular. In some regions, there are areas left over from which old field peas are still being prepared for human consumption. Latvians not only grow ordinary peas, but also love ancient grey peas, presenting them as a unique, representative dish of their country.

== Protected product ==
In 2015, Latvian large grey peas were entered into the Register of protected geographical indications for national products of the European Union. Dried peas of the "Retria" variety are best for these pea dishes, which differ from other smaller grey peas in their impressive size: 1000 peas weigh 360–380 g. Although their number in pods is not large, it is compensated by good culinary properties – relatively short cooking time, good taste properties. The State Institute of Crop Production (Latvian: Valsts Priekuļu laukaugu selekcijas institūts) is probably the only place in the world where large grey peas are selected and grown for food. The "Retriver" breed was also created here. The quality of peas is influenced by the appropriate Latvian soil and climatic conditions.

== Latvian recipe ==
- Ingredients: 500 g of red peas, 150 g of bacon, 80 g of onion, salt (to taste).
- Preparation: Soak the peas and cook them gently (it is important not to overcook so that the peas do not come out of their skin). Chopped bacon and onions are fried in a pan. Add cooked peas, salt, stir and serve.

As a snack, peas are served on a plate, sprinkled with salt, mixed with cracklings and onions. Kefir or sour milk can be served with them. Popcorn peas go well with beer.
