= List of traditional specialities guaranteed by country =

This is a list of traditional specialties guaranteed by country. Traditional specialities guaranteed (TSGs, singular traditional speciality guaranteed) are traditional food products protected under EU and/or UK law. This label differs from the geographical indications protected designation of origin (PDO) and protected geographical indication (PGI) in that the TSG quality scheme does not certify that the protected food product has a link to a specific geographical area, and thus a TSG product can be produced outside the area or country from which it originates. To qualify for the TSG label, a food product must be of "specific character" and its raw materials, production method, or processing must be "traditional".

All EU TSG registered before 1 January 2021 are also valid in the UK. The EU publishes its designations in the TSG database, and the UK in its TSG register. As of 31 July 2026, 57 names were registered under UK law and 72 under EU law.

== Multiple countries ==
Countries	Product name	Law	Short description	Image
Czech Republic and Slovakia	Tradiční Lovecký salám / Tradičná Lovecká saláma	EU/UK	Tradiční Lovecký salám (Czech) / Tradičná Lovecká saláma (Slovak) is a fermented meat product produced from mainly from pork, containing also beef. The products is produced in rectangular blocks.	Lovecký salám/Lovecká saláma
Czech Republic and Slovakia	Spišské párky	EU/UK	Spišské párky is a smoked dry sausage contained in sheep intestines (of <24 mm) with a weight of about 50 grams. The main ingredient is pork, but it also contains beef. The sausage is seasoned with sweet and hot paprika, which gives it a slightly spicy taste and a "pinkish-red" colour.	
Czech Republic and Slovakia	Liptovská saláma / Liptovský salám	EU/UK	Liptovská saláma (Slovak) / Liptovský salám (Czech) is a type of salami made of pork and beef. It is adapted from the Czechoslovak Industry standard ON 57 6913, which was adopted in 1978.	
Czech Republic and Slovakia	Tradiční špekáčky / Tradičné špekačky	EU/UK	Tradiční špekáčky (Czech) / Tradičné špekačky (Slovak) is a cooked meat product consisting of pieces of bacon mixed in a collagen. The sausage has a weight of 65-85 gram, a length of 8–9 cm and a diameter of 4.0-4.6 cm.	Špekáčky/Špekačky

== Austria ==
Product name	Law	Short description	Image
Heumilch / Haymilk / Latte fieno / Lait de foin / Leche de heno	EU/UK	Heumilch (German) or Haymilk is cow's milk produced from animals that have only been fed with grass or hay, and not with fermented fodder or wet grass products.	Haymilk in Italian (Latte fieno)
Schaf-Heumilch / Sheep's Haymilk / Latte fieno di pecora / Lait de foin de brebis / Leche de heno de oveja	EU/UK	Sheep's milk produced according to these specifications comes from sheep, which are "fed fresh grass, leguminous plants and foliage during the 'green-feeding period', and hay in the winter period."	
Ziegen-Heumilch / Goat's Haymilk / Latte fieno di capra / Lait de foin de chèvre / Leche de heno de cabra	EU/UK	Goat's milk produced according to these specifications comes from sheep, which are "fed fresh grass, leguminous plants and foliage during the 'green-feeding period', and hay in the winter period."	

== Belgium ==
Product name	Law	Short description	Image
Vieille Gueuze / Vieille Gueuze-Lambic / Vieux Lambic / Oude Geuze / Oude Geuze-Lambiek / Oude Lambiek	EU/UK	Vieille Gueuze or Vieille Gueuze-Lambic results from a blend of Lambics the weighted average age of which is one year or more, the oldest component having been aged in wooden barrels for at least three years.	
Vieille Kriek / Vieille Kriek-Lambic / Vieille Framboise-Lambic / Vieux fruit-Lambic / Oude Kriek / Oude Kriekenlambiek / Oude Frambozenlambiek / Oude Fruit-lambiek	EU/UK	According to the application, "Vieille Kriek or Vieille Kriek-Lambic results from a blend of Lambics in which the weighted average age is one year or more and the oldest component of which has been aged in wooden barrels for at least a year".	

== Bulgaria ==
Product name	Law	Short description	Image
Суджук Търновски / Sudzhuk Tarnovski / Търновски Суджук / Tarnovski Sudzhuk	EU	A kind of sujuk	
Кайсерован врат Тракия / Kayserovan vrat Trakiya	EU/UK	Кайсерован врат Тракия / Kayserovan vrat Trakiya is a meat product from boneless pork collar which is raw cured and pressed. After salting and dryging, it is rubbed in a "Kaiser mixture" consisting of red peppers, fenugreek, garlic, white wine and twine/hemp yarn.	
ЛуканкаПанагюрска / Lukanka Panagyurska	EU/UK	ЛуканкаПанагюрска / Lukanka Panagyurska a type of Lukanka (semi-dried salami) with a flattened cylindrical shape and brownish-red interior in a skin covered with a white fungus as originally produced near Panagyurska. Lukanka Panagyurska is produced from beef (60%) and pork, seasoned with black and white pepper, cumin, sugar and cooking salt.	Lukanka
Пастърма говежда / Pastarma Govezhda	EU/UK	Пастърма говежда / Pastarma Govezhda is a dried (raw) meat product, which tastes like matured beef, and which was produced without any spices or foreign flavours. It is flattened using wooden presses, which leads to its oblong shape.	
Суджук Търновски / Sudzhuk Tarnovski / Търновски Суджук / Tarnovski Sudzhuk	EU	Суджук Търновски / Sudzhuk Tarnovski / Търновски Суджук / Tarnovski Sudzhuk is a horse shoe shaped pressed meat product made from "ground beef, auxiliary ingredients and natural seasonings (black or white pepper, savory, cardamom and allspice), stuffed into natural bovine or porcine small intestine casing with a diameter of up to 40 mm". It was named after Veliko Tarnovo, capital city of the Second Bulgarian Empire.	
Луканка Троянска / Lukanka Troyanska / Троянска луканка / Troyanska lukanka	EU	Луканка Троянска / Lukanka Troyanska / Троянска луканка / Troyanska lukanka is a dried (raw) meat product.	
Роле Трапезица / Role Trapezitsa	EU/UK	Роле Трапезица / Role Trapezitsa is a meat product named after the hill Trapezitsa, Ta hill in Veliko Tarnovo (Bulgaria's old capital). It is prepared using frozen and chilled pork, seasoned with black or white pepper and garlic "stuffed into a casing made of bovine blind gut or collagen and netting and bound with twine".	
Филе Елена / File Elena	EU/UK	Филе Елена / File Elena is a pork tenderloin based product which originates from the town Elena, which is produced from chilled and frozen pork.	

== Croatia ==
Product name	Law	Short description	Image
Vrbovečka pera	EU	'Vrbovečka pera is a savoury or sweet pie similar to a cheese pizza. It has a thickness of about 2 centimeters (and 3 cm at the edges) and a diameter of about 35 cm. Its filling consists of cow milk based cottage cheese, milk, cream and eggs.	

== Czech Republic ==
Product name	Law	Short description	Image
Pražská šunka/Prague ham	EU/UK	Pražská šunka (English: Prague ham) is a type of brine-cured, stewed, and mildly beechwood-smoked boneless ham originally from Prague in Bohemia (Czech Republic). When cooked on the bone, it is called šunka od kosti ("Ham off the bone"), considered a delicacy. It was first marketed in the 1860s by Antonín Chmel, a pork butcher from Prague's Zvonařka ("Bell-Maker street") on the Nuselské schody (The Nusle Steps). As TSG, it is protected in all languages of the European Union as well as Serbian.	Prague ham

== Finland ==
Product name	Law	Short description	Image
Karjalanpiirakka	EU/UK	Karjalanpiirakka (lit. tr.: Karelian pasties), are traditional pasties or pirogs originating from the region of Karelia. They are eaten throughout Finland as well as in adjacent areas such as Estonia and northern Russia. The oldest traditional pasties usually had a rye crust, but the North Karelian and Ladoga Karelian variants also contained wheat to improve the baking characteristics. The common fillings were barley and talkkuna. In the 19th century, first potato and buckwheat were introduced as fillings, and later also rice and millet. Today, the most familiar and common version has a thin rye crust with a filling of rice. Mashed potato and rice-and-carrot fillings are also commonly available. Butter, often mixed with chopped-up boiled egg (egg butter or munavoi), is spread over the hot pasties before eating.	a Karjalanpiirakka
Kalakukko	EU/UK	Kalakukko is a traditional food from the Finnish region of Savonia made from fish (e.g. perch, vendace, roach, smelt or salmon) baked inside a loaf of bread. Kalakukko is especially popular in Kuopio, capital city of the Northern Savonia region.	An opened Kalakukko
Sahti	EU/UK	Sahti is a Finnish type of farmhouse ale made from malted and unmalted grains including barley and rye. Traditionally the beer is flavored with juniper in addition to, or instead of, hops; the mash is filtered through juniper twigs into a trough-shaped tun, called a kuurna in Finnish. Sahti is top-fermented and many have a banana flavor due to isoamyl acetate from the use of baking yeast, although ale yeast may also be used in fermenting. The end product is a cloudy beer with phenolic flavors and a distinct taste similar to banana, balanced by the bitterness from the juniper branches. The carbonation level tends to be very low. Sahti was traditionally brewed as a farmhouse ale, but commercial versions are now available. Commercial sahti is usually 8% ABV. In Finland, due to the higher percentage of alcohol in sahti, it is only sold in commercial sahti breweries, pubs or state-owned Alko stores, not in regular markets or grocery stores. Sahti has to be stored cold until consumption and is therefore not available in all Alko branches.	A bottle of Sahti

== France ==
Product name	Law	Short description	Image
Bœuf traditionnel de race Normande	EU	Normande beef	
Berthoud	EU/UK	Berthoud is an oven dish made exclusively from Abondance cheese, Savoy wine, either Madeira or Port, garlic, pepper and (optionally) nutmeg. It is to be served in a dedicated porcelain dish (assiette à Berthoud).	
Moules de bouchot	EU/UK	Moules de bouchot is a type of mussels that is exposed to outgoing tides and thus has developed strong adductor muscle and is hardened by sun and air during low tide. They may be of the genera Mytilus edulis and Mytilus galloprovincialis (or a cross of these two).	

== Germany ==
Product name	Law	Short description	Image
Kräuterhefe / Herbal yeast / Lievito di erbe / Levure d’herbes / Levadura herbaria	EU	Herbal yeast consists of lysed cells of Candida utilis	

== Hungary ==
Product name	Law	Short description	Image
Rögös túró	EU/UK	Rögös túró is a curd cheese characterized by its lumpy cauliflower-like texture, due to the gentle methods for removal of the superfluous whey (decanting or by gravitational methods; without pressing).	
Tepertős pogácsa	EU/UK	Tepertős pogácsa is a bakery product with a cylindrical shape (of about 4 cm diameter and 40 gr.) filled with pig fat and chopped pork crackling.	Pogácsa

== Italy ==
Product name	Law	Short description	Image
Amatriciana tradizionale	EU/UK	Amatriciana tradizionale is a traditional Italian pasta sauce based on guanciale (cured pork cheek), pecorino romano cheese, tomato, and, in some variations, onion. Originating from the town of Amatrice (in the mountainous Province of Rieti of Lazio region), the Amatriciana is one of the best known pasta sauces in present-day Roman and Italian cuisine.	Tagliatelle all'amatriciana
Pizza Napoletana	EU/UK	Pizza Napoletana (English: Neapolitan pizza) also known as Naples-style pizza, is a style of pizza made with tomatoes and mozzarella cheese. It must be made with either San Marzano tomatoes or Pomodorino del Piennolo del Vesuvio, which grow on the volcanic plains to the south of Mount Vesuvius, and Mozzarella di Bufala Campana, a protected designation of origin cheese made with the milk from water buffalo raised in the marshlands of Campania and Lazio in a semi-wild state, or the TSG "Mozzarella".	Pizza Napoletana
Mozzarella tradizionale	EU	Mozzarella was recognised as a TSG since 1996 in the EU but changed into Mozzarella traditionale in 2022. It is available fresh, usually rolled into a ball of 80 to 100 grams (2.8 to 3.5 oz) or about 6 cm (2.4 in) in diameter, and sometimes up to 1 kg (2.2 lb) or about 12 cm (4.7 in) diameter. It is soaked in salt water (brine) or whey, and other times citric acid is added and it is partly dried (desiccated), its structure being more compact. In this last form it is often used to prepare dishes cooked in the oven, such as lasagna and pizza.	
Vincisgrassi alla maceratese	EU	Vincisgrassi alla maceratese is a baked pasta originating from the Macerata province. The dish is made from fresh egg pasta and sauce with offal and béchamel. Parmigiano Reggiano or Grana Padano (both Protected Designations of Origin) are added to the dish.	Vincisgrassi alla maceratese

== Latvia ==
Product name	Law	Short description	Image
Jāņu siers	EU/UK	Jāņu siers (English: Jāņi cheese) is a fresh sour milk cheese. The production method, according to the TSG-application is: "'Jāņu siers' is produced from milk and curds; these are heated to remove the whey, and butter or cream, eggs, salt and caraway seeds are added to what is left. The resulting mass is heated and intensively stirred until a homogeneous consistency is obtained.".	3 Jāņu siers
Salinātā rudzu rupjmaize	EU/UK	Salinātā rudzu rupjmaize is a rye bread, which has been sweetened by pouring hot water over (part of) the rye flour. It is produced without baker's yeast and contains also 0.8% caraway seeds, 4-8% sugar and 0.3% (unfermented) rye malt.	
Sklandrausis	EU/UK	Sklandrausis is a sweet pie, made of rye dough and filled with potato and carrot paste and caraway.	Sklandrausis

== Lithuania ==
Product name	Law	Short description	Image
Lietuviškas skilandis	EU/UK	Lietuviškas skilandis is a meat product in which pork (sometimes complemented with beef) is placed in a casing of pigs' bladders, cows' caecums or (in the past) a pig's stomach. The meat is a combination of finely chopped meat (10–30 mm), chilled minced meat and fat (5–20 mm). The meat is matured for 3 days, after which it is smoked for 2–18 days, followed by a drying stage of at least 30 days.	Skilandis
Žemaitiškas kastinys	EU/UK	Žemaitiškas kastinys is a sour cream, which is complemented with butter (6-7%), sour milk (5%) and salt.	Žemaitiškas kastinys

== Netherlands ==
Product name	Law	Short description	Image
Suikerstroop	EU/UK	Suikerstroop (lit. 'Sugar syrup') is the "syrupy liquid obtained from the massecuite of the plant from which the product is made after extraction of the sugar crystals". The term Suikerstroop is only protected when used together with the term "made following the tradition of the Netherlands", as similar products with similar names (translations of "suikerstroop") are in use in other EU member states.	
Hollandse maatjesharing / Hollandse Nieuwe / Holländischer Matjes	EU/UK	Hollandse Nieuwe (maatjesharing or just maatjes in Dutch, or Matjes/matjes in German and Swedish respectively) is an especially mild salt herring, which is made from young immature herrings. The herrings are ripened for a couple of days in oak barrels in a salty solution, or brine. The pancreatic enzymes which support the ripening make this version of salt herring especially mild and soft. The term Hollandse Nieeuwe refers to herring that is both caught and sold in the period from 1 May to 31 August of the current calendar year; Hollandse Maatjesharing/Holländischer Matjes can also be sold after the end of the current fishing season.	Maatjesharing ready for consumption
Brown sugar / Basterdsuicker / Basterdsuijcker / Basterdsuijker / Basterd / Bastardsuiker / Bastardsuicker / Bastardsuijcker / Bastardsuijker / Bastard / Bastert / Bastertsuiker	EU/UK	Basterdsuiker consists of "pale to dark solid granules (crystals) which have a sweet taste (see also 3.7) and a very sweet odour", and which may have a caramel-like taste.	
Boerenkaas	EU/UK	Boerenkaas (lit. 'farmhouse cheese') is a Dutch cheese, most of which is handmade from raw milk from cattle, goats, sheep or buffalo. The cheese may also contain cumin or other seeds, herbs, and spices. Only Dutch cheese produced on a cheese farm in accordance with traditional and controlled production methods may be sold as Boerenkaas.	Boerenkaas with TSG mark in Dutch

== Poland ==
Product name	Law	Short description	Image
Czwórniak staropolski tradycyjny	EU/UK	Czwórniak staropolski tradycyjny is fermented beverage produced from mead worth consisting of honey and water in a ratio of 1 to 3. The name stems from the Polish word for "four", which is cztery. It is one of four distinct mead categories in Poland.	
Dwójniak staropolski tradycyjny	EU/UK	Dwójniak staropolski tradycyjny is fermented beverage produced from mead worth consisting of honey and water in a ratio of 1 to 1. The name stems from the Polish word for "two", which is dwa. It is one of four distinct mead categories in Poland.	Dwójniak mead
Kabanosy staropolskie	EU/UK	Kabanosy staropolskie is a long, thin, dry sausage made of pork which originated and was eaten throughout Poland from the 19twenties and thirties. They are smoky in flavor, and can be soft or very dry in texture depending on freshness.	Kabanos
Kiełbasa jałowcowa staropolska	EU/UK	Kiełbasa jałowcowa staropolska is a brown, long, thin, dry sausage made of pork which is heavily smoked. It is produced in two sizes: small (diameter over 32 mm, weight: 0.5 kg) and large (diameter over 36 mm, weight: 0.8 kg).	
Kiełbasa krakowska sucha staropolska	EU/UK	Kiełbasa krakowska sucha staropolska is a sausage made of pork originating from Kraków. The production method is according to Andrzej Różycki's book "Krakowskie wyroby wędliniarskie — praktyczne wskazówki o wyrobie wędlin" (English: Cracovian charcuterie — Practical advice on how to prepare charcuterie).	Kiełbasa krakowska sucha
Kiełbasa myśliwska staropolska	EU/UK	Kiełbasa myśliwska staropolska is a short dark brown sausage made of pork with a length of 15 cm and diameter of over 32 mm.	Kielbasa mysliwska
Olej rydzowy tradycyjny	EU/UK	Olej rydzowy tradycyjny is a type of Camelina oil produced from the species Camelina sativa (also called "false flax" and "gold of pleasure") or Camelina silvestris. The oil has a golden/red (rusty) colour. It is pressed with water or in sheets at a maximum temperature of 30 °C. The name is derived from the mushroom Saffron milk cap (Lactarius deliciosus), which as a similar colour.	
Pierekaczewnik	EU/UK	Pierekaczewnik is a meat pie consisting of 6 very thin layers of dough, interspersed with either meat (mutton, beef, goose or turkey), raisin/cheese (cottage cheese and/or raisins) or fruit (apples or dried plums), which originates from the Tatars.	Pierekaczewnik
Półtorak staropolski tradycyjny	EU/UK	'Półtorak staropolski tradycyjny is fermented beverage produced from mead worth consisting of honey and water in a ratio of 1 to 0.5. The name stems from the Polish word for "1.5", which is półtora. It is the sweetest of four distinct mead categories in Poland.	Półtorak mead
Trójniak staropolski tradycyjny	EU/UK	'Trójniak staropolski tradycyjny is fermented beverage produced from mead worth consisting of honey and water in a ratio of 1 to 2. The name stems from the Polish word for "3", which is trzy. It is one of four distinct mead categories in Poland.	Trójniak mead
Twaróg wędzony	EU	A type of tvorog	

== Portugal ==
Product name	Law	Short description	Image
Arroz de Sarrabulho à moda de Ponte de Lima	EU	Arroz de Sarrabulho à moda de Ponte de Lima is a rice dish in combination with specific meats/sausages: beloura, chouriça de verde and pork rojões.	
Bacalhau de Cura Tradicional Portuguesa	EU/UK	Bacalhau de Cura Tradicional Portuguesa is the traditional cod-dish using the cod species Gadus morhua after cleaning, at least 30 days of salting, maturing/ageing and drying according to the Portuguese tradition. The whole process should take at least 150 days and start with a cod of over 3 kilograms.	
Sopa de Pedra de Almeirim	EU	Sopa de Pedra de Almeirim is a soup made from potatoes, dried pinto beans and pork meat originating from Almeirim. Its name (English: stone soup) is derived from the large chunks that are present in the soup.	

== Romania ==
Product name	Law	Short description	Image
Salată tradițională cu icre de crap	EU	Salată tradițională cu icre de crap is a salad from salted carp roe and freshwater fish roe, as well as sunflower oil, lemon juice and carbonated water. The addition of boiled onions is optional. The product must be produced fresh and has a soft texture. The salad must consist of at least 24.5% roe.	Salată de icre de crap
Sardeluță marinată	EU	Sardeluță marinată is a marinated form of sprat (Sprattus sprattus phalericus and Sprattus sprattus), which is available in three varieties: in wine, in sunflower oil and in chili oil.	

== Spain ==
Product name	Law	Short description	Image
Jamón Serrano	EU/UK	Jamón Serrano is a dry-cured ham, which is salted and then left to stand for at least 40 days. The process is concluded with a drying/ageing process of at least 110 days. Hams must have a weight of at least 9.2 kg.	Jamón Serrano
Pulpo Seco de Adra	EU	Pulpo Seco de Adra is a salted and dried preparation of common octopus (Octopus vulgaris), caught and prepared near Adra.	
Tortas de Aceite de Castilleja de la Cuesta	EU/UK	Tortas de Aceite de Castilleja de la Cuesta Torta de aceite is a light, crisp and flaky sweet biscuit in the shape of a torta. The main ingredients are wheat flour, olive oil (27.7% extra virgin olive oil ± 2%), almonds, sugar, sesame seeds, anise seeds and anise flavor.	Tortas de Aceite

== Slovakia ==
Product name	Law	Short description	Image
Bratislavský rožok / Pozsonyi kiflia	EU/UK	Bratislavský rožok / Pozsonyi kiflia is a type of kifli and characterised as "Fine baker's ware or pastry with poppyseed or walnut filling and a glossy marbled surface."	Bratislavský rožok / Pozsonyi kiflia
Ovčí hrudkový syr – salašnícky	EU/UK	Ovčí hrudkový syr – salašnícky is a traditional mountain cheese, produced in shepard's huts (salaš, from which salašnícky is derived). It is produced from hand-milking sheep belonging to races which rear in the mountains.	
Ovčí salašnícky údený syr	EU/UK	Ovčí salašnícky údený syr is traditional mountain smoked mountain cheese, produced in shepard's huts (salaš, from which salašnícky is derived). It is produced from hand-milking sheep belonging to races which rear in the mountains. It is often produced in a large variety of shapes ("hearts, cockerels or other animals, hemispheres").	

== Slovenia ==
Product name	Law	Short description	Image
Belokranjska pogača	EU/UK	Belokranjska pogača is a pogača (a type of flatbread) mainly produced in Metlika and the wider Bela krajina region. It has a diameter of ca 30 centimeters and is 2 (edges) to 4 (middle) centimeters thick. It tastes best when it is still warm directly after baking.	
Idrijski žlikrofi	EU/UK	Idrijski žlikrofi are traditional Slovenian dumplings that originate from Idrija. They are made from dough with potato filling and are often served either as a side dish to meat or on their own, in which case they are topped with breadcrumbs. The recipe dates back to the mid 19th century and remains one of the most popular Slovenian dishes. Žlikrofi were awarded an EU protected geographical status in 2010 as Traditional Speciality Guaranteed, the first Slovenian dish to do so.	
Prekmurska gibanica	EU/UK	Prekmurska gibanica (Prekmurje layer pastry) is a type gibanica or layered pastry. It contains poppy seeds, walnuts, apples, raisins and quark fillings. Although native to Prekmurje, it has achieved the status of a national specialty of Slovenia. The unique sweetmeat shows the variety of agriculture in this region. The name gibanica comes from the dialect expression güba and in this case refers to a fold.	
Seneno meso	EU	Seneno meso (English: Hay meat) is meat of cattle, small ruminants and equine animals fed grass in summer (at least 120 days of grazing per year) and dried (non fermented) hay in winter.	
Slovenska potica	EU	Slovenska potica (English: Slovenian potica) is a nut roll and a traditional festive pastry from Slovenia. The name potica for a special dessert is distinctly Slovenian and has its etymological development from earlier Slovenian forms such as povitica, povtica, potvitsa. This is also connected with the development of potica production methods from the Middle Ages (before the 15th century) to the beginning of the 20th century, when development stabilized and the unique naming of potica was established from the 18th century. The term Slovenian potica has been used since the second half of the 19th century.	

== Sweden ==
Product name	Law	Short description	Image
Falukorv	EU/UK	Falukorv is a Swedish sausage (korv in Swedish) made of a grated mixture of smoked pork and beef or veal with potato starch flour, onion, salt and mild spices. Falukorv is a cooked sausage, so it can be eaten without any further preparation.	

== United Kingdom ==
Product name	Law	Short description	Image
Traditional Bramley Apple Pie Filling	EU/UK	The Pie Filling is a "homogeneous blend of Bramley apple pieces, sugar and water", using apples between 65 mm-115 mm in size, cut at a size larger than 15 mm.	
Traditionally Reared Pedigree Welsh Pork	EU/UK	The product is meat from Pedigree Welsh pigs, which had a diet of "low in protein where the protein percentage of purchased feed does not exceed 20 % post weaning.".	
Traditionally farmed Gloucestershire Old Spots pork	EU/UK	In order to be designated as such the product should be from Gloucestershire Old Spots, described as "traditional unimproved breeds". The animals should be reared using traditional farming methods, including allowing the meat to mature on the bone for several days. The Designation (System) refers to all products of the pig, including bacon, gammon, sausages etc.	
Watercress	EU/UK	Watercress is a plant in the cress family grown in flowing water using Nasturtium officinale seed at 10-12C. In the EU the terms is protected in several language variations as "Watercress / Cresson de Fontaine / Berros de Agua / Agrião de Água / Waterkers / Brunnenkresse". The term is only protected when accompanied with the term "made following the tradition of" followed by 1 or more of the countries: the United Kingdom, Belgium, Spain, France, The Netherland or Portugal. Other use of the term Watercress remains possible, regardless of whether the process is followed.	watercress beds

== Former TSGs ==
Eight TSGs were registered under earlier TSG regulations, but were not continued to the present scheme. Their validity ended on 4 January 2023 (except for Mozzarella in the UK, which name changed to Mozzarella traditionale).

Product name	Country	Law	Short description	Image
Lambic / Gueuze-Lambic / Gueuze / Lambiek / Geuze-Lambiek / Geuze	Belgium	EU/UK	Gueuze (Dutch geuze, pronounced [ˈɣøzə]; French gueuze, [ɡøz]) is a type of lambic, a Belgian beer. It is made by blending young (1-year-old) and old (2- to 3-year-old) lambics, which is bottled for a second fermentation. Because the young lambics are not fully fermented, the blended beer contains fermentable sugars, which allow a second fermentation to occur.	Gueuze Girardin
Kriek / Kriek-Lambic / Framboise-Lambic / Fruit-Lambic / Kriek / Kriekenlambiek / Frambozenlambiek / Vruchtenlambiek	Belgium	EU/UK	Kriek lambic is a style of Belgian beer, made by fermenting lambic with sour Morello cherries. Traditionally "Schaarbeekse krieken" (a rare Belgian Morello variety) from the area around Brussels are used. As the Schaarbeek type cherries have become more difficult to find, some brewers have replaced these (partly or completely) with other varieties of sour cherries, sometimes imported.	Kriek-Lambic
Faro	Belgium	EU/UK	Historically, a low-alcohol, sweetened beer made from a blend of lambic and a much lighter, freshly brewed beer to which brown sugar (or sometimes caramel or molasses) was added. The fresh beer was referred to as meertsbier, and was not necessarily a lambic. Sometimes herbs were added as well. The use of meertsbier (or water) and of substandard lambic in the blend made this a cheap, light, sweet drink for everyday consumption. The 19th century French poet Charles Baudelaire commented on faro's disagreeable aftertaste, "It's beer that you drink twice", believing that the Faro in Brussels was brewed from the waters of a river (the Senne or Zenne) that was also used as a sewer.	
Leche certificada de Granja	EU/UK	Spain	Leche certificada de Granja (English: certified farmhouse milk) is milk, which has been subjected to no other processing than (optional) pasteurization and packaging on the farm itself. The milk must come from pure bread dairy cattle.	
Mozzarella	UK	Italy	Mozzarella was recognised as a TSG since 1996, and is available fresh, usually rolled into a ball of 80 to 100 grams (2.8 to 3.5 oz) or about 6 cm (2.4 in) in diameter, and sometimes up to 1 kg (2.2 lb) or about 12 cm (4.7 in) diameter. It is soaked in salt water (brine) or whey, and other times citric acid is added and it is partly dried (desiccated), its structure being more compact. In this last form it is often used to prepare dishes cooked in the oven, such as lasagna and pizza. In the EU, the registration was amended and the name changed to Mozzarella tradizionale.	
Panellets	EU/UK	Spain	Panellets are small cakes or cookies in different shapes, mostly round, made mainly of marzipan (a paste made of almonds and sugar). The TSG description distinguishes Panellets made from basic marzipan, coarse marzipan and fine marzipan. Although natural colourants as well as fruit products (e.g. jam) may be added, the use of starch, apple and preservatives is forbidden.	Panellets
Hushållsost	EU/UK	Sweden	Hushållsost (English: household cheese) is a cows'-milk cheese. It is a semi-hard cheese, with small granular holes, and is made from whole milk, which gives it a 26 percent fat content. There is also a version with less fat labeled "17% fetthalt". Hushållsost is produced in cylinders weighing 1 to 2 kg (2.2 to 4.4 lb) each, which are today wrapped in plastic film before being aged around 60 days on average. The taste is described as mild yet somewhat sour. The cheese was traditionally produced on farms; the name hushållsost is found in print at least as early as 1898.	
Traditional Farmfresh Turkey	United Kingdom	EU/UK	The product is described as being superior in quality to standard turkeys. In order to be described as such the product must be produced using a specific method which includes using only birds which are over 20 weeks old, have been dry plucked, hung to mature and eviscerated after this period of hanging.	

== See also ==
List of PDO products by country
