= Layered rye bread =

Traditional Latvian dessert

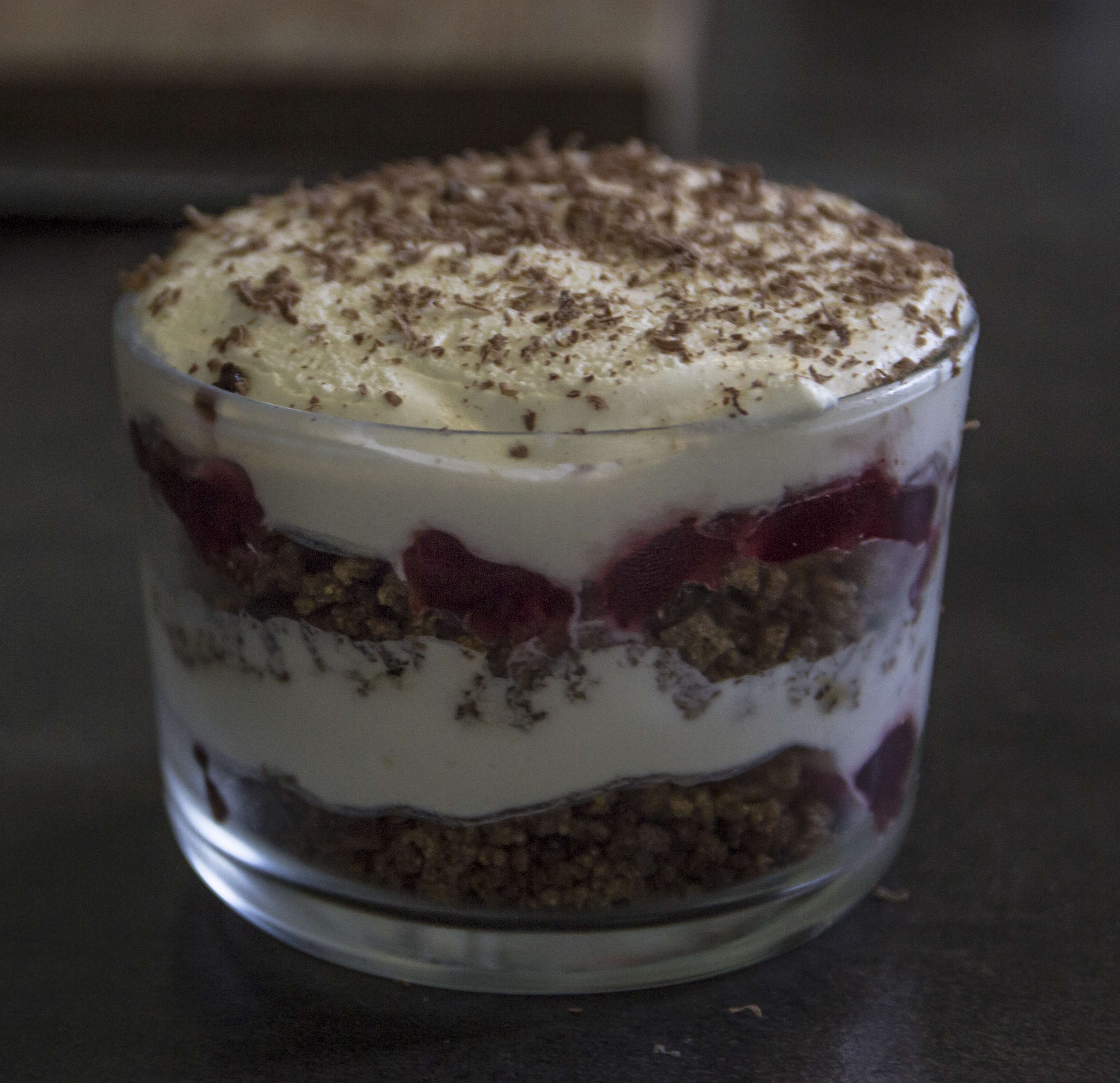
- Alternative names: Rye Bread Trifle, Latvian Ambrosia
- Type: Dessert
- Place of origin: Latvia
- Main ingredients: Rye breadcrumbs, blackcurrant or lingonberry jam, and whipped cream

Layered rye bread (Latvian: rupjmaizes kārtojums) is a traditional Latvian dessert made from rye breadcrumbs, blackcurrant or lingonberry jam, and whipped cream. It is topped off with grated dark chocolate and/or cinnamon and often served with fresh berries and cottage cheese ice cream.

Layered rye bread is similar in appearance and construction to the trifle of the British Isles, and is sometimes called rye bread trifle or Latvian ambrosia. Layered rye bread is an iconic Latvian food, and is considered one of the national dishes. It was the sweet chosen to represent Latvia in the Café Europe initiative of the Austrian presidency of the European Union, on Europe Day 2006.

== Preparation ==
Layered rye bread is prepared in a clear glass, trifle dish or parfait glass by first spreading a thin layer of jam or preserves on the bottom of the dish, then adding a thick layer of lightly sweetened vanilla-flavoured whipped cream or Mascarpone, which is then in turn sprinkled with a layer of dark rye bread crumbs. These layers are repeated up to the top of the dish when a final dollop of cream and sprinkling of the rye crumbs are added to enhance the dessert's appearance.

An authentic layered rye bread is made from the traditional Latvian dark rye bread made entirely from rye flour. The bread is finely grated and pan-toasted in case it's not already dried. The breadcrumbs are then flavoured with cinnamon and sugar. Borodinsky bread, and failing this, a dark pumpernickel, are sometimes used as a substitute in preparing this dessert when Latvian bread is not available. In a variation of the dessert the bread is soaked in brandy.

Raspberry, strawberry and apricot are favourite preserves for preparing layered rye bread among Latvians, as are the more peculiarly Latvian aronia, sea buckthorn, lingonberry, rose hip and red currant varieties.

After preparing the dessert it is chilled thoroughly, since, over the course of several hours, the flavours of the individual ingredients meld, the rye crumbs soften and absorb fruit and cream liquids, and the dessert acquires a more cohesive texture. Fresh fruit is often added to the top of the dessert as a festive garnish to match or complement the jam variety used just before serving the dish.
