= Camelina oil =

Pressed seed oil derived from Camelina sativa

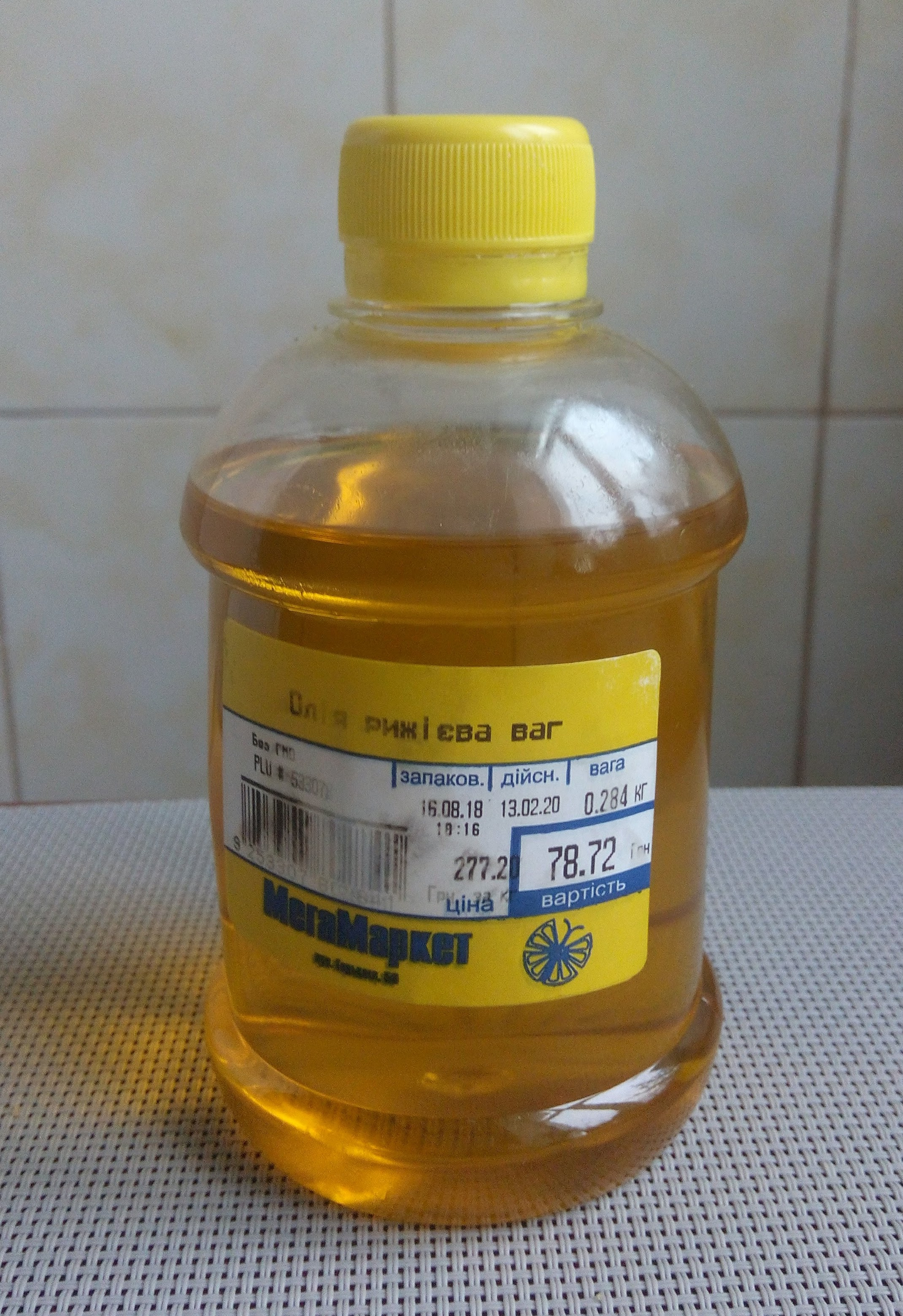
Camelina oil

Camelina oil or False flax oil is a pressed seed oil, derived from the Camelina sativa or false flax, also called gold of pleasure. False flax has long been grown in Europe, and its oil used as a lamp oil until the 18th century. In recent times, it has been explored for use in cosmetic and skin care products. It has a high content of omega-3 and is used as a food supplement by some cultures. It is registered under the name "Olej rydzowy tradycyjny" as a Traditional Speciality Guaranteed product in the European Union and the United Kingdom.

In the United States the Food and Drug Administration has accepted the oil as self-affirmed GRAS status. False flax belongs to the Brassicaceae (mustard and cabbage) family, which also contains many other seed oil plants, such as rapeseed. Typically it contains 1–3% erucic acid but several Camelina Sativa varieties with erucic acid content of less than 1% have been introduced.

The seeds contain an average of 37% by weight of oil, and contain significant levels of the following fatty acids:

Component	Percentage	Category
Alpha-linolenic (ALA, 18:3)	25.1–31.9%	Polyunsaturated, omega-3
Oleic (18:1)	14.3–18.9%	Monounsaturated, omega-9
Linoleic (18:2)	18.6–26.3%	Polyunsaturated, omega-6
Gondoic (20:1)	12.4–15.3%	Monounsaturated, omega-9
Palmitic (16:0)	6.1–7.6%	Saturated
Erucic (22:1)	2.4–3.4%	Monounsaturated, omega-9
Stearic (18:0)	2.3–3.0%	Saturated

== See also ==
- Biodiesel
- Vegetable oils
- Rapeseed oil
