= Rupjmaize =

Latvian rye bread

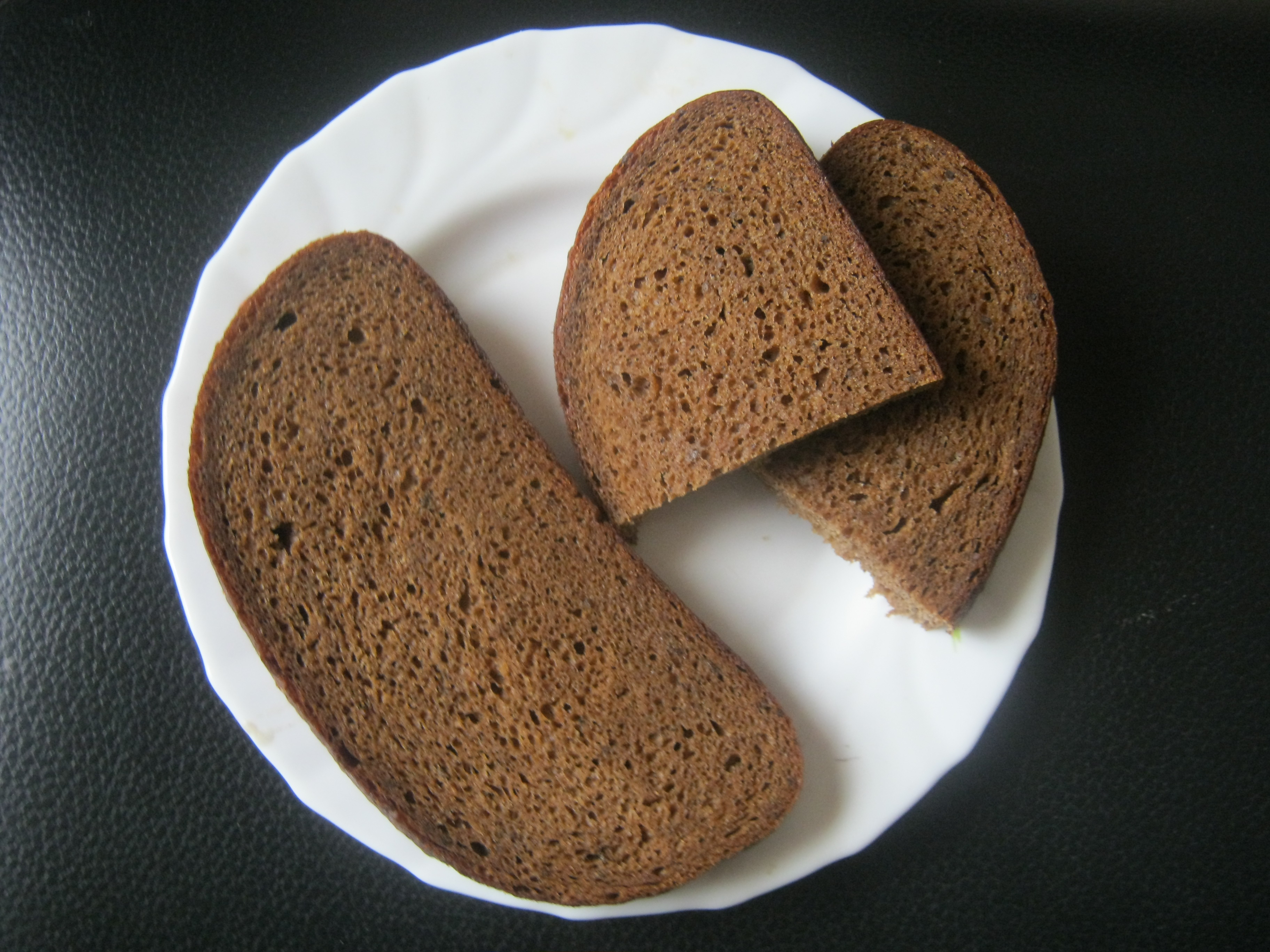
- Slices of rupjmaize
- Type: Bread
- Place of origin: Latvia
- Main ingredients: Rye

Rupjmaize is a traditional dark bread made from rye and is considered to be the staple of the Latvian diet. The first written references to Latvian rye bread are found in a recipes book dating back to 1901.

The bread is made in a wood fueled hearth furnace from coarse (1740. and 1800. type) rye flour, with the addition of malt and caraway seeds as ingredients, giving the bread its characteristic flavor and aroma.

It is also used to make Rupjmaizes kārtojums, a traditional Latvian dessert.

Salinātā rudzu rupjmaize is a special type of Rupjmaize, which has been sweetened by pouring hot water over (part of) the rye flour. It was registered as a Traditional Speciality Guaranteed in the EU in 2013.
