= Luganega =

Italian fresh pork sausage

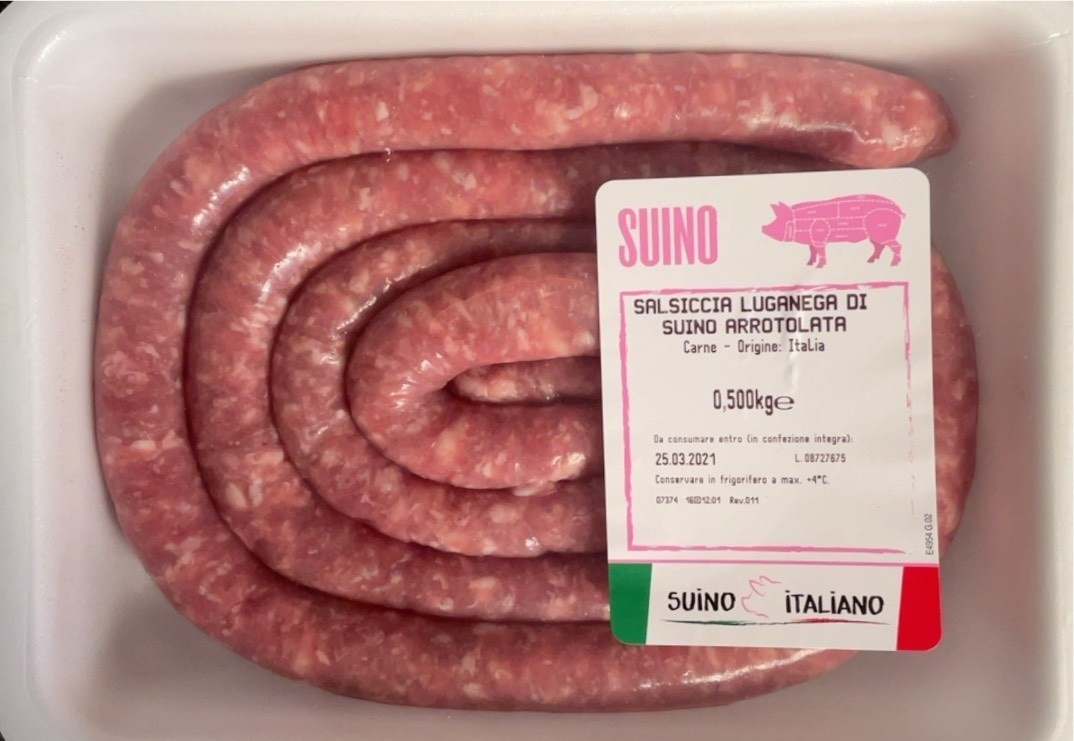
- Alternative names: Luganiga, luganica, lucanica
- Place of origin: Italy
- Region or state: Northern Italy
- Main ingredients: Pork
- Variations: With cheese, sweet wine, broth

Luganega (also called luganiga, luganica or lucanica) is an Italian fresh sausage made with pork. It is a traditional food from Lombardy, Veneto and northern Italy and is usually rolled up to appear like a snail. However, the sausage is originally from Southern Italy, deriving from the Italic tribe called the Lucanians, which lived in Basilicata and Calabria in pre-Roman Italy. Lucanian soldiers spread the sausage called Lucanica to Rome and from there to other parts of the Latin-speaking empire, where it survives in many languages in similar form, for example, the Portuguese linguica.

Luganega is part of the risotto alla monzese (Monza-style risotto), a variant of risotto alla milanese, can be used in barbecues or in rich stews together with mushrooms or potatoes.

It has a few variations: in the richest one pork is united with Grana Padano, Marsala wine and broth.

== See also ==
- Lucanica
