= Café Europe =

Cultural initiative of the Austrian presidency on the European Union

Café Europe, Café d'Europe or also Café Europa was a cultural initiative of the Austrian presidency of the European Union, held on Europe Day (9 May 2006) in 27 cafés of the capitals of the then 25 EU member states and the two countries which would join the Union in 2007, Bulgaria and Romania. Vienna, the capital of Austria, is well known for its long and vibrant café culture, dating back from the first introduction of coffee to Europe as a result of the trade with the Ottoman Empire via Italy in the 16th and 17th centuries.

== Sweet Europe ==
The initiative also included a presentation, called Sweet Europe, of typical sweets and cakes of every member state.

Austria	Gugelhupf
Belgium	Waffles
Bulgaria	Sweet rice with milk (мляко с ориз)
Cyprus	Baklava (μπακλαβάς)
Czech Republic	Koláč
Denmark	Danish pastry (Wienerbrød)
Estonia	Oatmeal cookies (Kaerahelbeküpsised)
Finland	Laskiaispulla (Semla)
France	Madeleines
Germany	Streuselkuchen
Greece	Vasilopita (Βασιλόπιτα)
Hungary	Dobos Torta
Ireland	Scones
Italy	Tiramisù
Latvia	Layered rye bread (Rupjmaizes kārtojums)
Lithuania	Šakotis
Luxembourg	Apfeltorte
Malta	Imqaret
Netherlands	Tompouce
Poland	Mazurek kajmakowy
Portugal	Pastel de nata
Romania	Cozonac
Slovakia	Walnut strudel (orechovy zavin)
Slovenia	Prekmurska gibanica
Spain	Tarta de Santiago
Sweden	Kanelbulle
United Kingdom	Shortbread
