= Lucanica =

Ancient Roman pork sausage

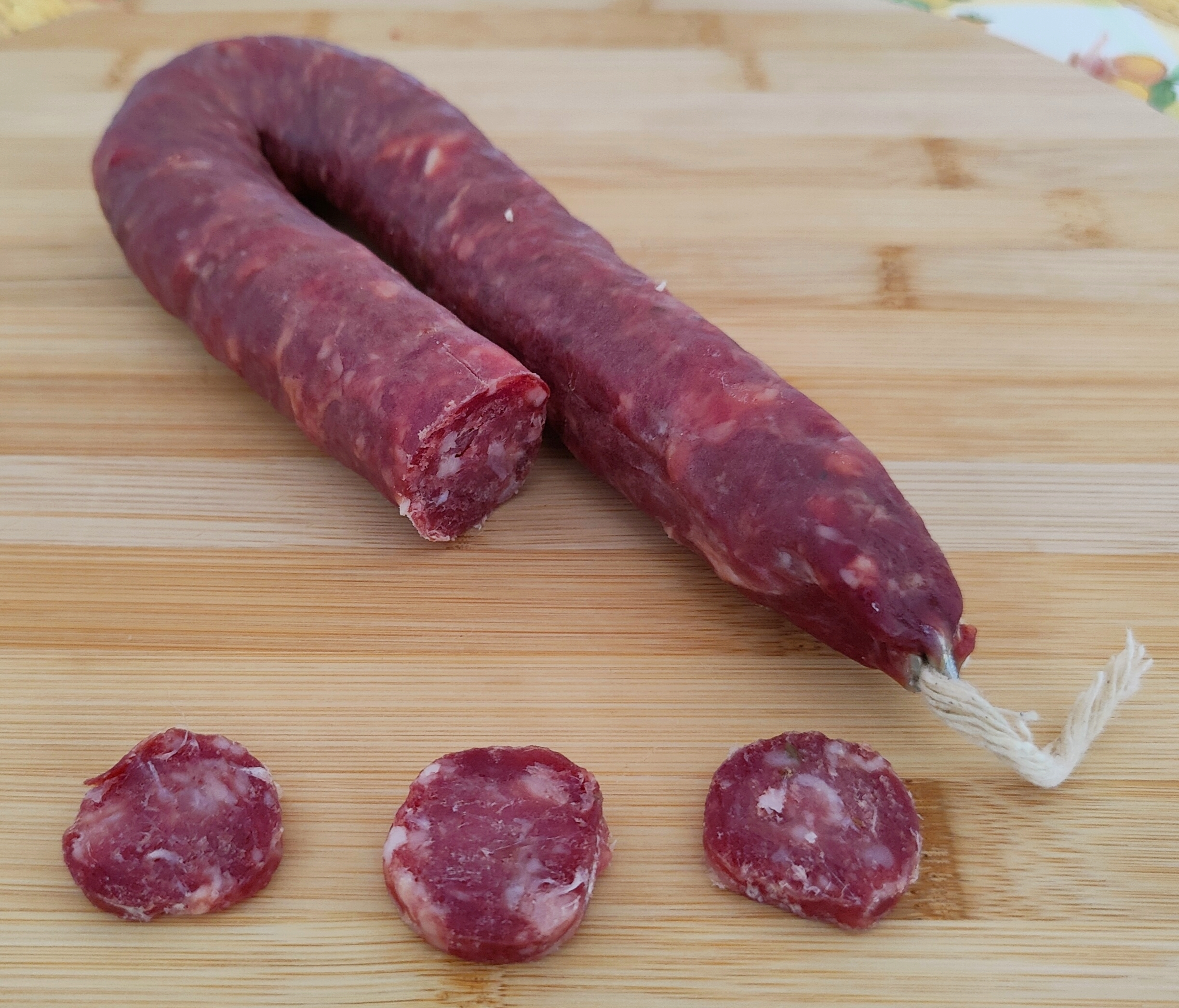
Lucanica di Picerno, a product that derives from the ancient lucanica sausage

Lucanica was a rustic pork sausage in ancient Roman cuisine. Apicius documents it as a spicy, smoked beef or pork sausage originally from Lucania; according to Cicero and Martial, it was brought by Roman soldiers from Lucania.

It has given its name to a variety of sausages (fresh, cured, and smoked) in Mediterranean cuisine and its colonial offshoots, including:

- Italian luganega or lucanica
- Portuguese and Brazilian linguiça
- Bulgarian lukanka or loukanka
- Macedonian (Western dialects) lukanec/луканец or lukanci/луканци
- Albanian (Arbëresh community in Italy) likëngë or lekëngë, also llukanik in Albania.
- Greek loukaniko, a fresh sausage usually flavored with orange peel
- Spanish, Latin American and Philippine longaniza, a name which covers both fresh and cured sausages
- Arabic laqāniq, naqāniq, or maqāniq, made of mutton and some semolina
- Modern Hebrew naqniq (נקניק), an umbrella term for 'sausage'
- Basque lukainka
- Croatian luganiga, flavored with cinnamon

Today, lucanica is identified as lucanica di Picerno, produced in Basilicata (whose territory was part of the ancient Lucania).

== See also ==
- Luganega
