= Loukaniko =

Type of Greek sausage

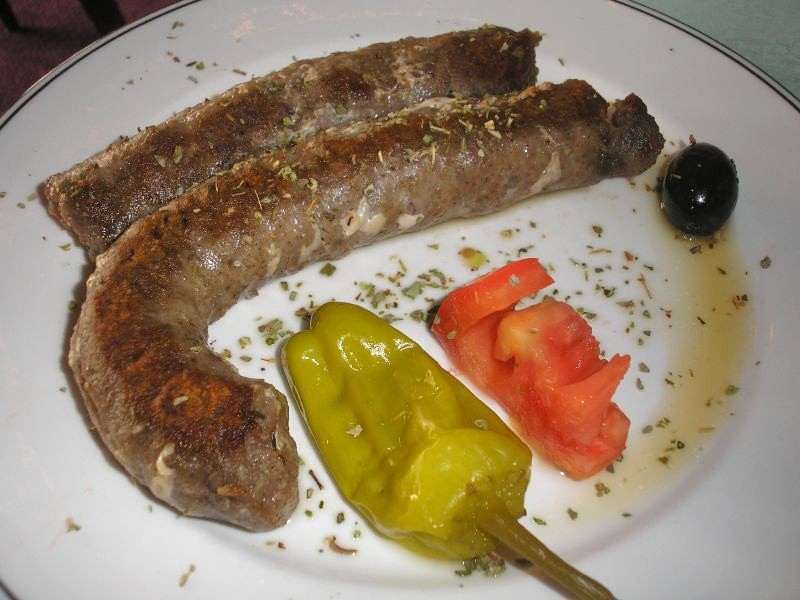
- Loukaniko Lemonato
- Type: Sausage
- Place of origin: Greece
- Main ingredients: Pork or lamb
- Ingredients generally used: Orange peel, fennel seed, and various other dried herbs and seeds
- Similar dishes: Lucanica

Loukaniko (Greek: λουκάνικο) is a type of Greek sausage made from pork or lamb and typically flavored with orange peel, fennel seed, and various other dried herbs and seeds, and sometimes smoked over aromatic woods. They are also often flavored with greens, especially leeks.

Loukaniko is often served as a mezze, sliced and fried, sometimes with saganaki. It is also cooked into a variety of dishes.

The name 'loukaniko' is derived from ancient Roman cuisine's lucanica (from Lucania region of Southern Italy) and has been used in Greece since at least the 4th century.

== See also ==
- Lucanica or luganega, an Italian sausage with a related name
- Lukanka, a Bulgarian sausage with a related name
- Longaniza, any of a variety of sausages from Spain, Latin America, and the Philippines with a related name
- Linguiça, any of a variety of sausages from Portugal, Goa, Macau and Brazil
- Soujouk, a spicy, dry, lean sausage found in from the Balkans and Middle East
- Likëngë
- List of smoked foods
