= Hushållsost =

Swedish Cheese

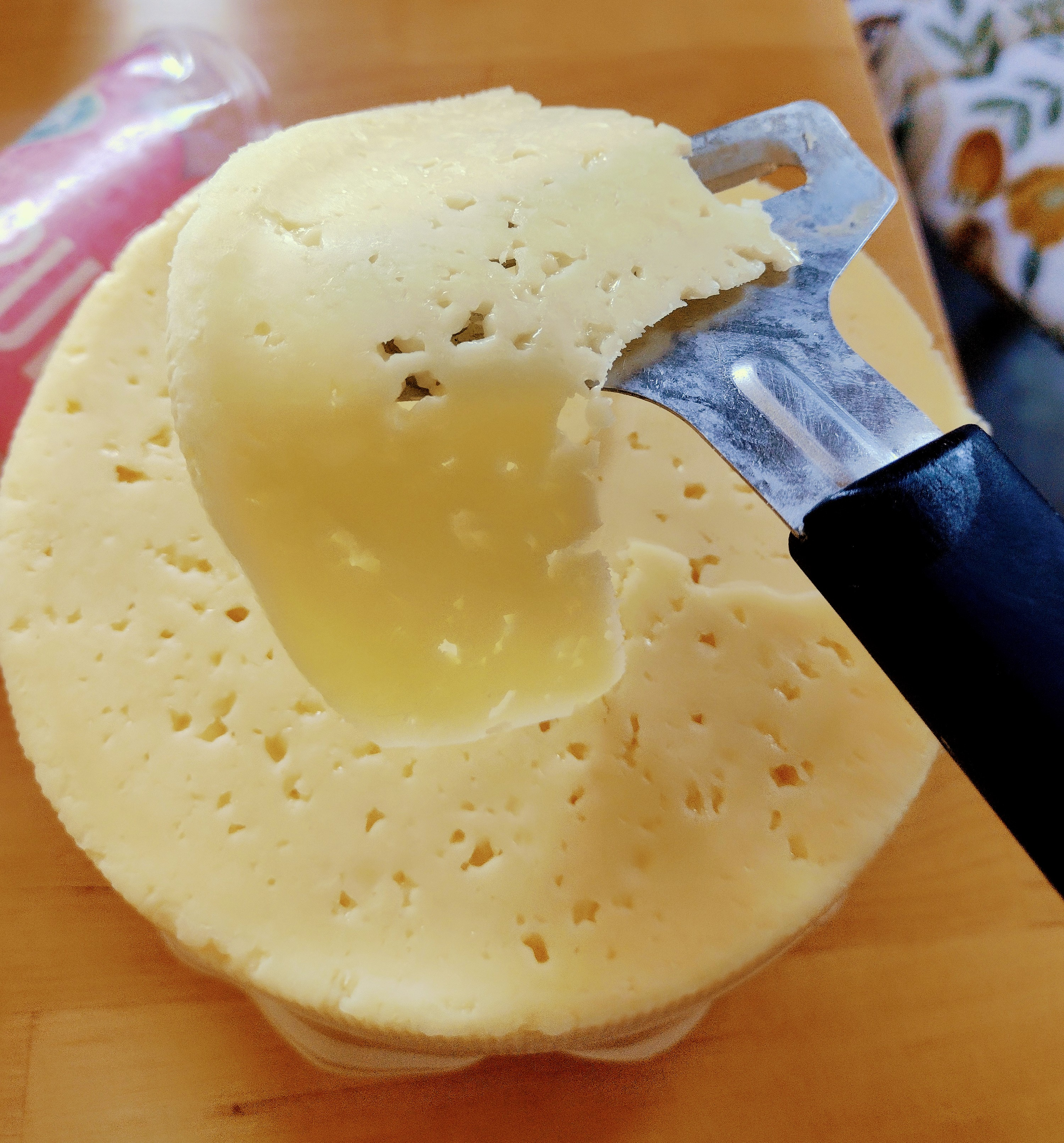
- Other names: Household cheese
- Country of origin: Sweden
- Source of milk: Cows
- Pasteurised: Yes
- Texture: Semi-hard
- Aging time: 60 days

Hushållsost ("household cheese") is a Swedish cows'-milk cheese. It is a semi-hard cheese, with small granular holes, and is made from whole milk, which gives it a 26 percent fat content. There is also a version with less fat labeled "17% fetthalt". Hushållsost is produced in cylinders weighing 1 to 2 kg (2.2 to 4.4 lb) each, which are today wrapped in plastic film before being aged around 60 days on average. The taste is described as mild yet somewhat sour. The cheese was traditionally produced on farms; the name hushållsost is found in print at least as early as 1898. It is closely related to Port-Salut cheese.

Consumed at a rate of 15 thousand tonnes a year, hushållsost is the most popular cheese in Sweden. It used to have Traditional Speciality Guaranteed (TSG) Status in the EU and the UK, but that expired 4th of January, 2023.

== See also ==
- List of cheeses
