= Traditional speciality guaranteed =

Legally-protected food product

EU Traditional Speciality Guaranteed logo in Spanish

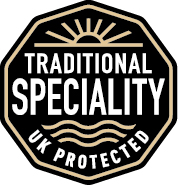
UK Traditional Speciality Guaranteed

A traditional speciality guaranteed (TSG; pl.: traditional specialities guaranteed) is a traditional food product protected under European Union and/or United Kingdom law. This label differs from the geographical indications protected designation of origin (PDO) and protected geographical indication (PGI) in that the TSG label does not certify that the protected food product has a link to a specific geographical area, and thus a product can be produced outside the area or country from which it originates.

To qualify for the TSG label, a food must be of "specific character" and its raw materials, production method, or processing must be "traditional". Title III of European Union Regulation 1151/2012 (Articles 17-26) deals with the TSG scheme, with specific terms defined in Article 3: "specific character" is defined as "the characteristic production attributes which distinguish a product clearly from other similar products of the same category", and "traditional" is defined as "proven usage on the domestic market for a period that allows transmission between generations; this period is to be at least 30 years".

For a food name to be registrable under the TSG scheme it must (a) have been traditionally used to refer to the specific product or (b) identify the traditional character or specific character of the product.

A TSG creates an exclusive right over the registered product name. Accordingly, the registered product name can be used by only those producers who conform to the registered production method and product specifications.

According to an article in the European Law Journal, "The legal function of the TSG is to certify that a particular agricultural product objectively possesses specific characteristics which differentiate it from all others in its category, and that its raw materials, composition or method of production have been consistent for a minimum of 30 years. Thus, TSG food denominations are registered trade signs with a distinctive function."

== Use of geographical indications in TSG ==
Some TSG designations require the use of products with a protected designation of origin, protected geographical indication, or another traditional speciality guaranteed for their preparation.

- Pizza Napoletana requires the use of either the PDO mozzarella di bufala campana (made from buffalo) or the TSG mozzarella.
- Berthoud, which is a dish created from molten PDO cheese abondance, the PDO wine vin de Savoie, as well as either the PDO fortified wines madeira or port.
- Vincisgrassi alla maceratese is a baked pasta finished with the PDO Parmigiano Reggiano or Grana Padano.

== Lists of TSG products by country ==
All 64 TSG registered before 1 March 2024 in the EU are also protected in the UK. As of 18 April 2021, 57 TSG have been registered (see list) in the UK and 72 in the EU, all of which originate from the EU or the UK. The distribution by country of application is shown below:

TSG by country
Country	EU law registrations	UK law registrations	Example
Austria	3	3	Heumilch / Haymilk / Latte fieno / Lait de foin / Leche de heno
Belgium	2	2	Vieille Gueuze / Vieille Gueuze-Lambic / Vieux Lambic / Oude Geuze / Oude Geuze-Lambiek / Oude Lambiek
Bulgaria	7	5	Луканка Панагюрска / Lukanka Panagyurska
Croatia	1	0	Vrbovečka pera
Czech Republic	5 (Note: Out of which 4 TSG registrations are shared between Slovakia and the Czech Republic.)	5	Pražská šunka
Finland	3	3	Karjalanpiirakka
France	3	2	Moules de bouchot
Germany	1	0	Kräuterhefe / Herbal yeast / Lievito di erbe / Levure d’herbes / Levadura herbaria
Hungary	2	2	Tepertős pogácsa
Italy	4	3	Pizza Napoletana
Latvia	3	3	Sklandrausis
Lithuania	2	2	Lietuviškas skilandis
Netherlands	4	4	Hollandse maatjesharing / Hollandse Nieuwe / Holländischer Matjes
Poland	10	10	Trójniak staropolski tradycyjny
Portugal	3	1	Bacalhau de Cura Tradicional Portuguesa
Romania	2	0	Salată tradițională cu icre de crap
Spain	3	2	Jamón Serrano
Slovakia	7	7	Bratislavský rožok / Pozsonyi kiflia
Slovenia	5	3	Belokranjska pogača
Sweden	1	1	Hushållsost
United Kingdom	4	4	Traditional Bramley Apple Pie Filling
