= Lukanka =

Bulgarian salami

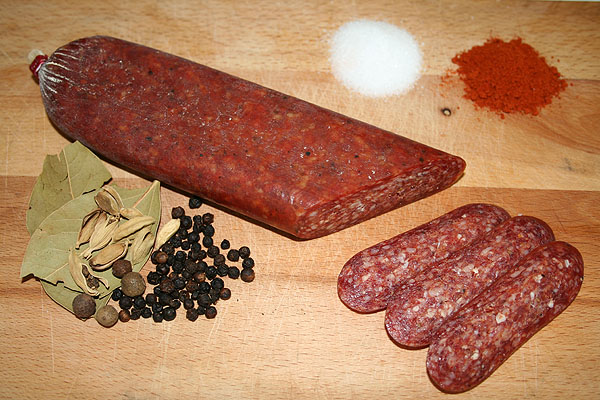
- Course: Sausage
- Place of origin: Bulgaria
- Main ingredients: Pork, Veal

Lukanka (Bulgarian: луканка) is a Bulgarian (sometimes spicy) salami unique to Bulgarian cuisine. It is similar to sujuk, but often stronger flavored. Lukanka is semi-dried, has a flattened cylindrical shape, and brownish-red interior in a skin that is normally covered with a white fungus. The mix of small pieces of meat and fat give the interior a grainy structure.

Traditionally, lukanka salami is made of pork, veal, and spices (black pepper, cumin, salt), minced together and stuffed into a length of dried cow's intestine as a casing. After stuffing, the cylindrical salami is hung to dry for about 40 to 50 days in a well-ventilated location. In the process of drying, the salami is pressed to acquire its typical flat form. Lukanka is usually finely sliced and served cold as an appetizer or starter.

The taste qualities of lukanka depend on natural characteristics of the region it is produced in, and are formed under the influence of the typical microflora of the local geographic environment. There are several regions in Bulgaria well known for lukanka production. Most of these are located in central Bulgaria, at the foot of the Balkan mountain range, notably the Smyadovo, Panagyurishte, and Karlovo regions. "Karlovska lukanka" is a name protected on a local level by the Patent office of the Republic of Bulgaria for lukanka from the Karlovo region. The "Lukanka panagyurska" of Panagyurishte has obtained an EU and UK-wide Traditional specialities guaranteed (TSG) denomination.

== See also ==
- Lucanica
- Loukaniko
- List of sausages
