= Geographical indications and traditional specialities in the European Union =

Protected names and designations

European Union protected geographical indication (PGI) logo

Three European Union schemes of geographical indications and traditional specialties, known as protected designation of origin (PDO), protected geographical indication (PGI), and traditional speciality guaranteed (TSG), promote and protect names of agricultural products and foodstuffs, wines and spirits. Products registered under one of the three schemes may be marked with the logo for that scheme to help identify those products. The schemes are based on the legal framework provided by the EU Regulation No 1151/2012 of the European Parliament and of the Council of 21 November 2012 on quality schemes for agricultural products and foodstuffs.

This regulation applies within the EU as well as in Northern Ireland. Protection of the registered products is gradually expanded internationally via bilateral agreements between the EU and non-EU countries. It ensures that only products genuinely originating in that region are allowed to be identified as such in commerce. The legislation first came into force in 1992. The purpose of the law is to protect the reputation of the regional foods, promote rural and agricultural activity, help producers obtain a premium price for their authentic products, and eliminate the unfair competition and misleading of consumers by non-genuine products, which may be of inferior quality or of a different flavour. Critics argue that many of the names, sought for protection by the EU, have become commonplace in trade and should not be protected.

Based on these regulations, within the EU (and certain jurisdictions outside the EU), certain products can only be labelled as such if they come from the designated region. To qualify as roquefort, for example, cheese must be made from milk of a certain breed of sheep, and matured in the natural caves near the town of Roquefort-sur-Soulzon in the Aveyron region of France, where it is colonised by the fungus Penicillium roqueforti that grows in these caves.

Due to the horizontal and exhaustive nature of the legal regime, this system transcends national appellation systems used throughout Europe, such as the appellation d'origine contrôlée (AOC) used in France, the denominazione di origine controllata (DOC) used in Italy, the denominação de origem controlada (DOC) used in Portugal, the denumire de origine controlată (DOC) system used in Romania and the denominación de origen (DO) system used in Spain. The regulations still allow member states to use their own languages in packaging, but geographical indications law is still the sole domain of the EU. The EU Commission has the final word on applications for protection.

A new EU Regulation on geographical indication protection for craft and industrial products was published on 27 October 2023 and entered into force on 16 November 2023. Producers and manufacturers of these products will be able to file applications for GI protection with the European Union Intellectual Property Office (EUIPO) from 1 December 2025. Only the Protected Geographical Indication (PGI) logo will be applicable for craft and industrial products.

== Protection and enforcement ==
In countries where laws on protected geographical status are enforced, only products which meet the various geographical and quality criteria may use the protected indication. It is also prohibited to combine the indication with words such as "style", "type", "imitation", or "method" in connection with the protected indications or to do anything which might imply that the product meets the specifications, such as using distinctive packaging associated with the protected product.

Protected indications are treated as intellectual property rights by the Customs Regulation 1383/2003 (Regulation concerning customs action against goods suspected of infringing certain intellectual property rights and the measures to be taken against goods found to have infringed such rights), and infringing goods may be seized by customs on import. Within the European Union, enforcement measures vary: infringement may be treated as counterfeit, misleading advertising, passing off or even as a question of public health. Outside Europe, the protection of PGS products usually requires bilateral agreements between the EU and the importing countries, while protected indications may not always supersede other intellectual property rights such as trademarks.

On 15 November 2011, the European Court of Auditors presented its report Do the design and management of the geographical indications scheme allow it to be effective? to the European Parliament.

== Objectives of the protection ==
The preambles to the regulations cite consumer demand for quality foodstuffs, and identify a number of goals for the protection regimes:

- the promotion of products with specific characteristics, particularly those coming from less-favoured or rural areas;
- the improvement of the income of farmers, in return for a "genuine effort to improve quality";
- the retention of population in rural areas;
- the provision of clear and succinct information to consumers regarding product origin.

The provision of recompense for efforts to improve quality and the need for consumer protection are often cited as justifications for trade mark protection in other domains, and geographical indications operate in a similar manner to trademarks.

== General regime ==
The general regime governs the use of protected designations of origin (PDO) and protected geographical indications (PGI) for food and certain other agricultural products. There are separate regimes for spirits and aromatised drinks (geographical designations) as well as for wines (geographical indications, often referred to as appellations). The origin of the product is only one of the criteria for use of the protected terms: the product must also meet various quality criteria. The label "Traditional Specialities Guaranteed" (TSG) is a similar protected term which does not impose any restrictions on the geographical origin of the product.

The protection of geographical indications was extended to foodstuffs and other agricultural products in 1992. Given the widely different national provisions, this "general regime" gives much more power to the European Commission (compared to the special regimes) to ensure harmonised protection across the European Union. It is currently governed by the Regulation on the protection of geographical indications and designations of origin for agricultural products and foodstuffs (No 510/2006).

To qualify for a PDO, the product must have qualities and characteristics which are essentially due to its region of production: it must also be produced, processed and prepared exclusively within that region. The requirements for a PGI are slightly less strict; a good reputation of a product from a given region is sufficient (rather than objectively different characteristics) if any of the steps of production, processing and preparation may take place within the region. Otherwise, the protection afforded by the two terms is equivalent.

An application for a PDO or a PGI is first made to the authorities of the relevant Member State. It is judged by the Member State against the criteria in the Regulation and, if found to be acceptable, forwarded to the European Commission for final approval. Applications are published at both the national and Community stages of examination, and third parties can object to proposed PDOs or PGIs which they feel would harm their business. A recurrent objection is that the proposed denomination is a generic term for the product in question: generic names cannot be registered but, once registered, the denominations are protected from genericisation. Hence Cheddar cheese was deemed to be a generic name, but the PDO "West Country farmhouse Cheddar cheese" was allowed. Feta was deemed not to have become generic, and was registered as a PDO to the disappointment of cheesemakers outside of Greece.

== Description of the regimes ==
=== Protected designation of origin (PDO) ===
The protected designation of origin is the name of an area, a specific place or, in exceptional cases, the name of a country, used as a designation for an agricultural product or a foodstuff,

- which comes from such an area, place or country,
- whose quality or properties are significantly or exclusively determined by the geographical environment, including natural and human factors,
- whose production, processing and preparation take place within the determined geographical area.

In other words, to receive the PDO status, the entire product must be traditionally and entirely manufactured (prepared, processed and produced) within the specific region and thus acquire unique properties.

=== Protected geographical indication (PGI) ===
The protected geographical indication is the name of an area, a specific place or, in exceptional cases, the name of a country, used as a description of an agricultural product or a foodstuff.

- which comes from such an area, place or country,
- which has a specific quality, goodwill or other characteristic property, attributable to its geographical origin,
- at least one of the stages of production, processing or preparation takes place in the area.

In other words, to receive the PGI status, the entire product must be traditionally and at least partially manufactured (prepared, processed or produced) within the specific region and thus acquire unique properties.

=== Traditional specialities guaranteed (TSG) ===
The TSG quality scheme aims to provide a protection regime for traditional food products of a specific character. Differing from PDO and PGI, this quality scheme does not certify that the protected food product has a link to a specific geographical area and that a product can thus be produced outside the area or country from which it originates.

To qualify for a TSG a food must be of "specific character" and either its raw materials, production method or processing must be "traditional". Under Art. 3 of Regulation 1151/12 "specific character" is defined as "the characteristic production attributes which distinguish a product clearly from other similar products of the same category". Under Art. 3 of Regulation 1151/12 "traditional" is defined as "proven usage on the domestic market for a period that allows transmission between generations; this period is to be at least 30 years".

For a food name to be registrable under the TSG scheme it must (a) have been traditionally used to refer to the specific product; or (b) identify the traditional character or specific character of the product.

A TSG creates an exclusive right over the registered product name. Accordingly, the registered product name can be used by only those producers who conform to the registered production method and product specifications.

"The legal function of the TSG is to certify that a particular agricultural product objectively possesses specific characteristics which differentiate it from all others in its category, and that its raw materials, composition or method of production have been consistent for a minimum of 30 years. Thus, TSG food denominations are registered trade signs with a distinctive function."

As of 14 November 2021, 65 TSG have been registered (see list), all of which originate from the EU or the UK.

== Relationship to trademark law ==
In principle, a similar protection to a geographical indication could be obtained through a collective trademark. Indications which serve exclusively to identify the place of origin of goods are not registrable as trademarks under Art. 6quinquies.B.2 of the Paris Convention for the Protection of Industrial Property (Paris Convention), which has effect in European Union law by Art. 7 of the Regulation on the Community trade mark (No 40/94) and by Art. 3 of the Directive to approximate the laws of the Member States relating to trademarks (89/104/EEC); however, marks which also serve to identify the quality of a product originating in a certain region may be registered so long as they have not become generic in the trade concerned.

Trademarks which have been registered before the registration of a PDO or a PGI may continue to be used, but the registration of an equivalent trademark after the approval of a PDO or PGI is impossible (Art. 13, Regulation (EC) No 510/2006). The existence of a trademark (registered or unregistered) may be a reason to refuse the registration of a PDO or a PGI [Art. 7(3)(c), Regulation (EC) No 510/2006]. Hence the Polish geographical designation "Herbal vodka from the North Podlasie Lowland aromatised with an extract of bison grass" (Polish: Wódka ziołowa z Niziny Północnopodlaskiej aromatyzowana ekstraktem z trawy żubrowej), so phrased as to avoid infringing the trademark "Żubrówka."

== Special regimes ==
The protection of geographical indications for wines and other alcoholic drinks was historically the first to be developed at both national and Community levels. It is also the only protection which is recognised by the Agreement on Trade-Related Aspects of Intellectual Property Rights (TRIPS), administered by the World Trade Organization, although the European Union is pushing for other geographical indications to be included in the Doha Round of world trade negotiations.

=== Wines ===
European Union rules governing the production of wine ("the product obtained exclusively from the total or partial alcoholic fermentation of fresh grapes, whether or not crushed, or of grape must") are considerably longer than EU trade mark law: the main text, the Regulation on the common organisation of the market in wine (No 1493/1999), runs to over 46,000 words. To be considered as a "quality wine", the wine must come from a specified region and be associated with a "geographical indication" or appellation: indeed, the technical term used in the Regulation is quality wine psr, with the "psr" standing for "produced in a specified region". Wines which do not meet this requirement may only be marketed as table wine.

There has been little harmonisation of national provisions within the European Union. Member States delimit the specified areas of production and determine the rules and appellations which apply: the European Commission restricts itself to publishing the information provided by the Member States. Appellations are usually the geographical name of the area in which the wine is produced, although there are some historical exceptions: muscadet and blanquette in France, cava and manzanilla in Spain and vinho verde in Portugal. The appellations are not necessarily unique: Cava may refer either to a quality sparkling wine psr produced in Spain or to a Greek table wine which has been aged (as a transliteration of "Κάβα").

=== Spirits ===
The Regulation laying down general rules on the definition, description, presentation, labelling and protection of spirit drinks (110/2008) provides for a double system of protection of spirit descriptions. Spirits are divided into 46 categories, which each have rules for fabrication and minimum strength. Within these categories, certain names are reserved for drinks from particular countries, for example ouzo, which is aniseed-flavoured spirit drink which must have been produced exclusively in Greece or Cyprus, or grappa, which is a grape marc spirit produced in Italy, or pálinka, which is a purely fruit based spirit produced in Hungary (or parts of Austria for apricot spirits only).

The Regulation also defines a number of geographical designations, which are reserved for drinks which "acquired their character and definitive qualities" in the area denominated. The exact delimitation of the areas and any other regulations are left to the Member States concerned. By way of derogation, the designations Königsberger Bärenfang and Ostpreußischer Bärenfang are permitted for certain German drinks even though they refer to Königsberg (Kaliningrad) and East Prussia which are no longer part of Germany.

=== Aromatised drinks ===
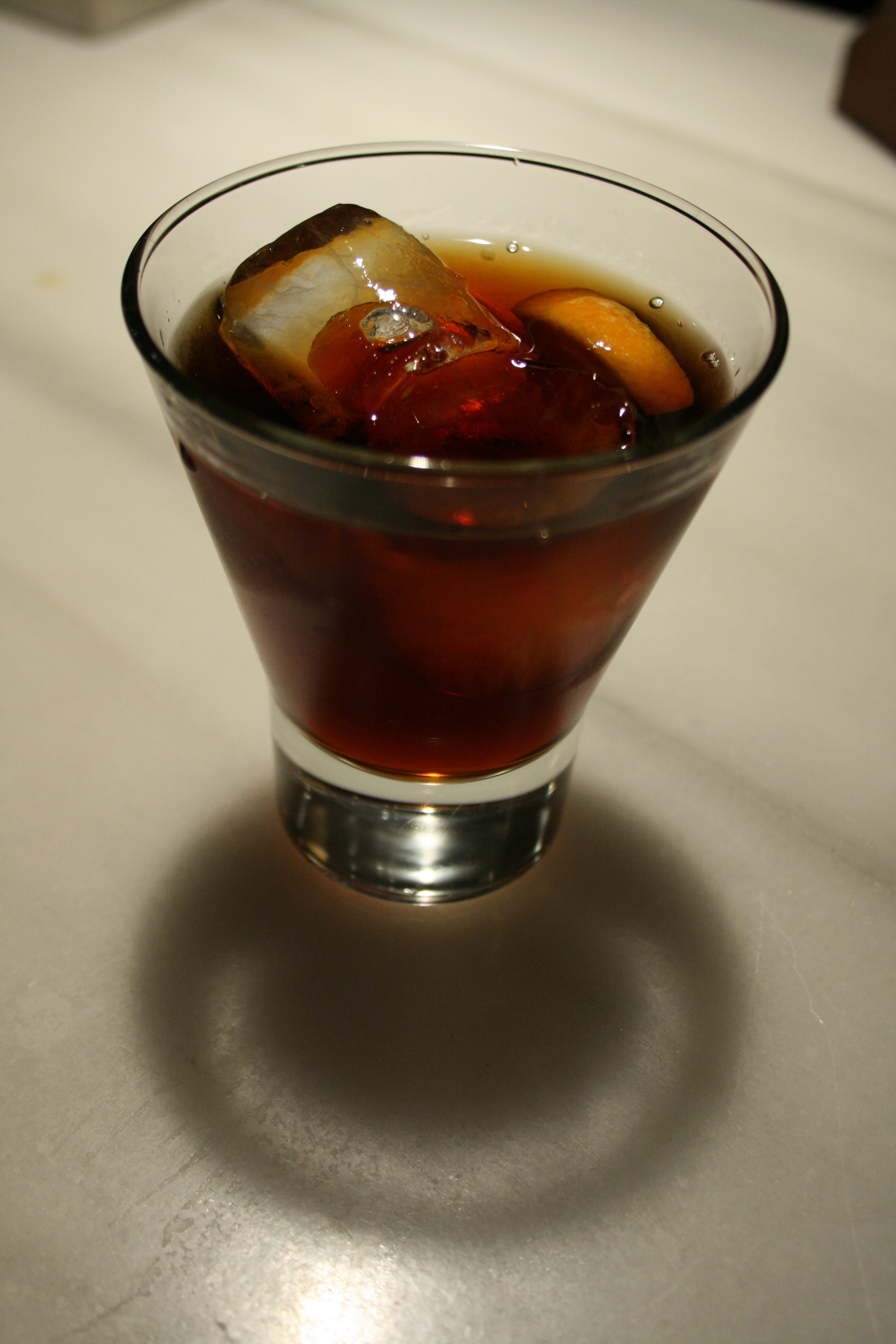
Vermouth

The Regulation laying down general rules on the definition, description and presentation of aromatised wines, aromatised wine-based drinks and aromatised wine-product cocktails (No 251/2014) institutes a system of protected denominations for aromatised drinks which is very similar to that for spirits. The association of general names with specific countries is weaker: a drink labelled simply "Sangria" must have been produced in Spain or Portugal, for example, but it is permissible to label a drink "Sangria produced in the United Kingdom: aromatised wine-based drink" if the drink meets the other requirements to be described as sangria. Similarly, the denomination "Clarea" on its own is reserved for drinks produced in Spain. As of January 2020, the protected geographical designations are:

- Vermouth di Torino (vermouth original: 1757) (Italy)
- Nürnberger Glühwein (Germany)
- Thüringer Glühwein
- Vermouth de Chambéry (France)
- Samoborski bermet

== Within the European Union ==
Article 13 of this legislation states that registered designations are protected against:

... any usurpation or imitation, even if the true origin of the product is indicated or if the appellation is used in translated form or accompanied by terms such as "kind", "type"...

This legislation expanded the 1951 Stresa Convention, which was the first international agreement on cheese names. Seven countries participated: Austria, Denmark, France, Italy, Norway, Sweden, and Switzerland.

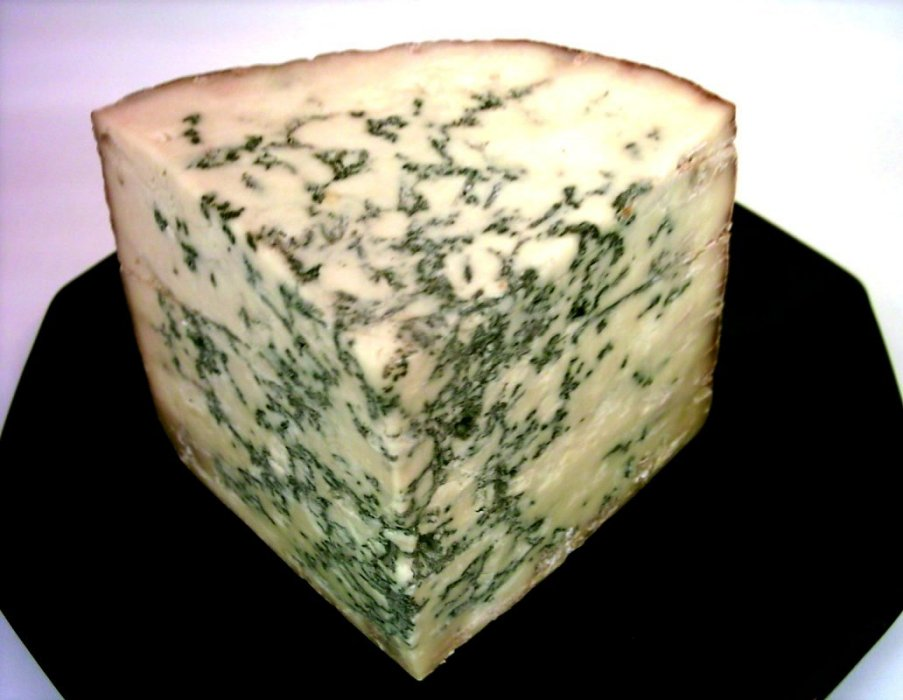
Stilton – an example of an origin-protected product

Selected products include Prosciutto Toscano (PDO) from Italy, bryndza podhalańska (PDO) and oscypek (PDO) from Poland, Marchfeldspargel (PGI) from Austria, Lübecker Marzipan (PGI) from Germany, Scotch Beef and Lamb (PGI) from Scotland, bryndza (PGI) and Oštiepok (PGI) from Slovakia, Kaszëbskô malëna (Kashubian garden strawberry) (PGI) from Poland.

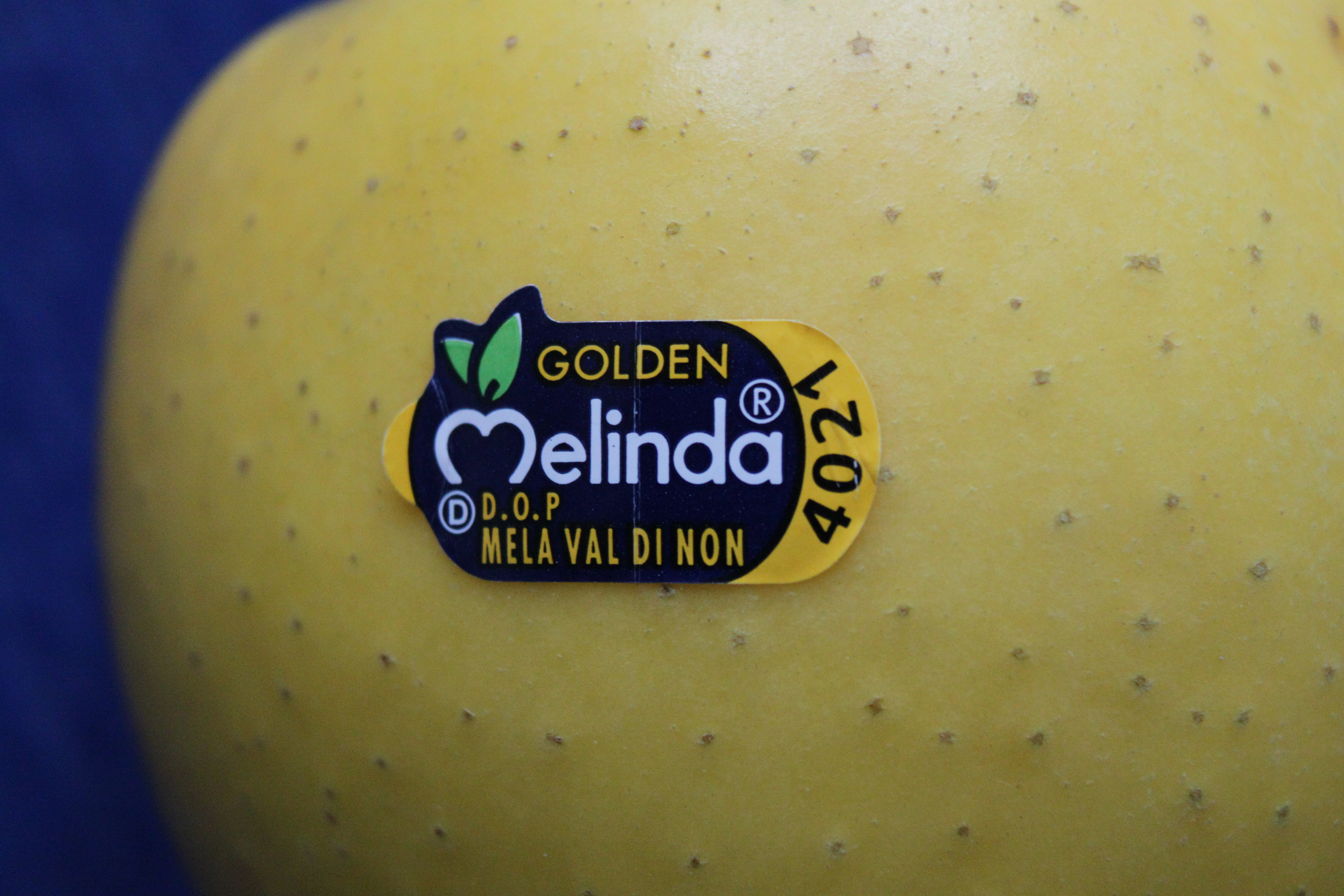
A PDO apple

In certain cases, the name of widely popular products became generic, and therefore could not be protected afterwards. Cheddar cheese, for instance, originating in the English village of Cheddar, is produced in many countries, including the US, Canada, Australia and New Zealand. Hence the "Cheddar" name is not protected, but the more specific name "West Country Farmhouse Cheddar" is. Other products are protected in Europe but not elsewhere: Buffalo Mozzarella for instance is protected in Europe, but the name is used without restrictions by US dairy companies.

The geographical limitations are strict: Newcastle Brown Ale was restricted to being brewed in the city of Newcastle upon Tyne in England. However, having obtained this protection for their product, the brewery decided in 2004 that it would move across the river Tyne to Gateshead. As Gateshead is a separate town—albeit only the width of the river apart—it does not fall within the required geographical restriction. The brewery then applied to the European Union authorities to have the geographical restriction revoked. If the restriction had not been revoked, the brewery would have been forced either to move back to Newcastle, or stop calling its beer "Newcastle" brown ale. Ultimately, the brewery's application to revoke the geographic restriction was approved. Similarly, Stilton cheese can only be produced in the three English counties of Derbyshire, Leicestershire, and Nottinghamshire. Stilton village is in the traditional county of Huntingdonshire, now a district of Cambridgeshire, so Stilton cheese cannot be produced in Stilton (although it is unclear whether the cheese was ever produced there. Quenby Hall in Leicestershire claims to be the first producer).

New Season Comber Potatoes or Comber Earlies were awarded PGI status in 2012. Only immature potatoes grown in the restricted geographical area surrounding the town of Comber in Northern Ireland harvested between the start of May and the end of July can be marketed as Comber Earlies.

== Outside the European Union ==
There is no automatic protection for these names on products both made and sold outside the EU, except for Northern Ireland, where the relevant regulation applies. However, there are a number of bilateral agreements with the EU for some level of enforcement. Agreements of this type exist between the EU and Australia (wine, 1994) (but not cheese), Canada (wine and spirits, 2003), China, Chile (wine and spirits, 2002), Colombia (2007, coffee) Mexico (1997, spirit drinks), and South Africa (2002, wine and spirits).

Besides dedicated agreements on geographical indications, mutual recognition of geographical indications is part of free trade agreements, such as Association Agreements (e.g. with Armenia, Ukraine and Moldova). Geographical indications are (following an objection period where GIs can be refused) furthermore protected in the member states of the 2015 Geneva Act to the Lisbon Agreement for the Protection of Appellations of Origin and their International Registration, to which (apart from the EU and some of its member states) also Albania, Cambodia, Samoa, Laos and North Korea are parties. However, as of August 2021, the EU has not submitted any Geographical Indications for registration.

As the Geographic indication scheme of the EU is not limited to products from EU locations, also products from outside the EU have received the designation. For example Colombian coffee was protected by the PDO in August 2007.

=== Australia ===
Following an agreement during the 1990s by the Australian Wine and Brandy Corporation and the Australian and EU governments, the others' GIs and the nations' traditional terms of winemaking were meant to have been protected by 1997. However, this has been proceeding slowly, and while some GIs have been protected in Australia, others are still available for use (primarily for products that have always been called that). It seems unlikely it will have any effect on colloquial speech in the short term.

=== China ===
China recognizes Geographical Indication Products. One such product is Yongfeng chili sauce (Chinese: 永丰辣酱), also called Yongfeng hot sauce.

=== Canada ===
In Canada, a 2003 agreement made with the EU provides for the protection of the names of wine and spirits.

Under the Comprehensive Economic and Trade Agreement (CETA) between Canada and the EU, Canada agrees "to protect 143 geographical indications for high-quality European products, such as Italian balsamic vinegar from Modena, Dutch Gouda cheese or Roquefort cheese and many others."

=== United Kingdom ===
After Brexit, the UK has its own Protected Geographical Indication scheme, independently of the EU one, but based on the same requirements. All existing EU geographic indications on 31 December 2020 are protected under UK law (as well as EU law), but this is not the case for designations registered after that date.

== List of products with PDO/PGI/TSG classifications ==
The register of wines, agricultural products and spirits with a European Union Protected Designation of Origin (PDO) or Protected Geographical Indication (PGI) is in eAmbrosia, Traditional Specialities Guaranteed (TSG) have a separate register. Both are at the European Agriculture site.

Note that the database contains both approved designations (status "Registered") and designations not yet approved (status "Applied" or "Published").

More information can also be found in GIview, a GI database by the European Union Intellectual Property Office (EUIPO) and the European Commission.

== Criticisms of Protected Geographical Status framework ==
Somewhat paradoxically the PGS framework can be posited as both a protectionist move against global agro-economic policy, and a market-based neoliberal tool of agricultural governance. This makes it an equally important battleground for both the anti-globalization movement, and the free-trade proponents of Australia and the United States, and a number of criticisms of each have been put forward:

=== Issues of governance ===
- Conceding the market as the locus of regulation. Common Agricultural Policy (CAP) reforms have slowly introduced a raft of market-based instruments (MBIs) to regulate the agro-food sector (the PGS framework is one of them). The market is seen as the ideal "arms-length" mechanism with which to foster growth, re-balance imperfections in the connected industries and add previously uncalculated value to European produce. But their social and ecological protections are perpetually unequal, falling short of providing any instance of a Polanyian "double-movement". That is, generating a societal reaction to the "dehumanizing" effects of the self-regulating market.
- Creating markets where none previously existed. By creating so-called "ethical food markets", food producers have been able to command a greater price for their goods. The PDO/PGI regimes foster the creation of ethical food markets, predicated on "local" produce. For example, traditional Grimsby smoked fish producers have seen PGI accreditation "help keep the margins up", in difficult economic circumstances. In these instances, the "local" is valorised as inherently "good" or at least better than produce from an unrestricted, globalised food market.
- Providing barriers to entry. The drawing of boundaries around certain food and drink products prevents other actors from entering particular markets. On this point, the PGS framework can potentially deny (or make extremely difficult) entry into the agro-food sector. For example, there are stringent geographical, productive, facilitative, planning, temporal and skilled constraints to entry into the Stilton cheese market in the UK. The successful application to protect the Cornish pasty is another recent example; with Ginsters of Cornwall central to the bid (itself owned by the "extra-local", Leicestershire-based Samworth Brothers – also makers of fellow PGS protected Melton Mowbray Pork Pies).
- Narrowing competition in existing markets. Where markets already exist, there is the propensity for the narrowing of competition, if certain PGS applications are accepted. The state – instead of absolving all responsibility (often thought of as occurring in a neoliberal economy) – is tied with the task of carefully controlling the market. Product price fixing, supermarket consolidation, labour control, and profit-channelling are all potential issues. Within the UK, the Competition Commission is charged with investigating regulatory powers vis-à-vis markets and company mergers, to prevent (or at least temper) such problems.
- Geographically fixing capital. Due to the nature of the PGS framework, capital is concentrated in particular areas. As rights are not directly transferable, PGI/PDO certification is granted to those with landed property rights. Monopolised (and thus higher) land rents can often result; to the detriment of those who rely on such lands.
- Devolving power to consumers. Some proponents have suggested that ethical food markets – and the PGS framework directly – has furthered a "cash till" form of political democracy, whereby consumer spending power can masquerade as a legitimate governance structure and mechanism (i.e. democratically voted, representative, and therefore accountable). This is part of a broader shift from forms of "government" to "governance" seen in a neoliberalizing world, where a raft of non-state actors, arguably, make informed decisions about where and what to purchase.

=== Other criticisms ===
The United States and Australia have disagreed with the EU's characterization of geographical indications, rejecting the idea that the scheme would eliminate unfair competition and the misleading of consumers. They rather posit that many of these names have become generic and are not reflective of the reputation of a distinctive product originating in a certain region. They also believe that the EU uses the scheme to monopolize markets and to restrict fair competition. As the EU continues to enter into trade agreements with third countries, it often requires these countries to recognize its list of geographical indications as a condition of concluding the agreement, thereby eliminating already existing competition by the United States or Australia.

== See also ==
- Appellation
- Country of origin
- European Union Common Agricultural Policy
- Generic trademark
- Geographical indication
- List of PDO products by country
- List of Traditional Specialities Guaranteed products by country
- List of geographical designations for spirit drinks in the European Union
- List of European cheeses with protected geographical status
- List of Italian products with protected designation of origin
- List of Portuguese food and drink products with protected status
- List of Republic of Ireland food and drink products with protected status
- List of United Kingdom food and drink products with protected status
- Protectionism
- Quality Wines Produced in Specified Regions (QWPSR)
- Terroir
