= Vincisgrassi =

Pasta dish from Marche, Italy

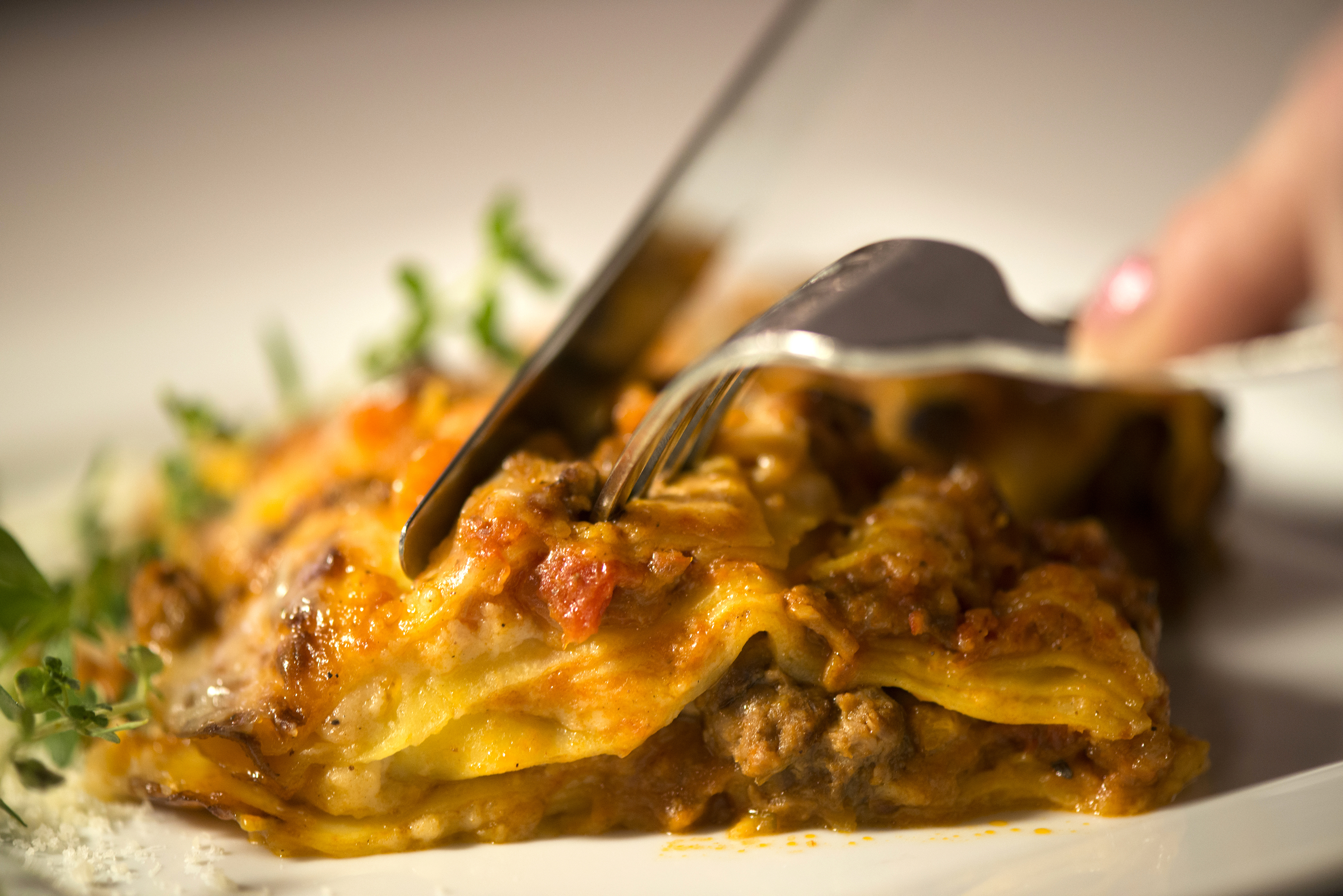
- Alternative names: Vincesgrassi
- Course: Primo (Italian course)
- Place of origin: Italy
- Region or state: Marche
- Main ingredients: Durum wheat

Vincisgrassi, also spelled vincesgrassi, is a typical Marche pasta dish similar to lasagna, considered one of the gastronomic emblems of the Marche cuisine.

== Origins and history ==
According to tradition, the Italian name of the dish derives from simplification and italianization of the name of the general Alfred von Windisch-Grätz who defeated the Napoleonic troops in the siege of Ancona in 1799. A lady from Ancona prepared this dish in his honor. The general appreciated the dish so much that the population decided to name it for him. It is not clear, however, if the dish was invented in honor of the general or if it was a dish already known at the time that was dedicated to him. In Il cuoco maceratese, a book of 1779, Antonio Nebbia describes the preparation of particular lasagna called princisgrass with a richer recipe. So, probably, the dish was already present in the culinary tradition of the Marche, and in particular of Macerata.

Since 2022, in the EU the vincisgrassi alla maceratese (from Macerata) has been registered as a traditional speciality guaranteed.

== See also ==
Media related to Vincisgrassi at Wikimedia Commons

- List of pasta
- List of pasta dishes
