= Mead in Poland =

Fermented alcoholic beverage made from honey and water

Miód pitny
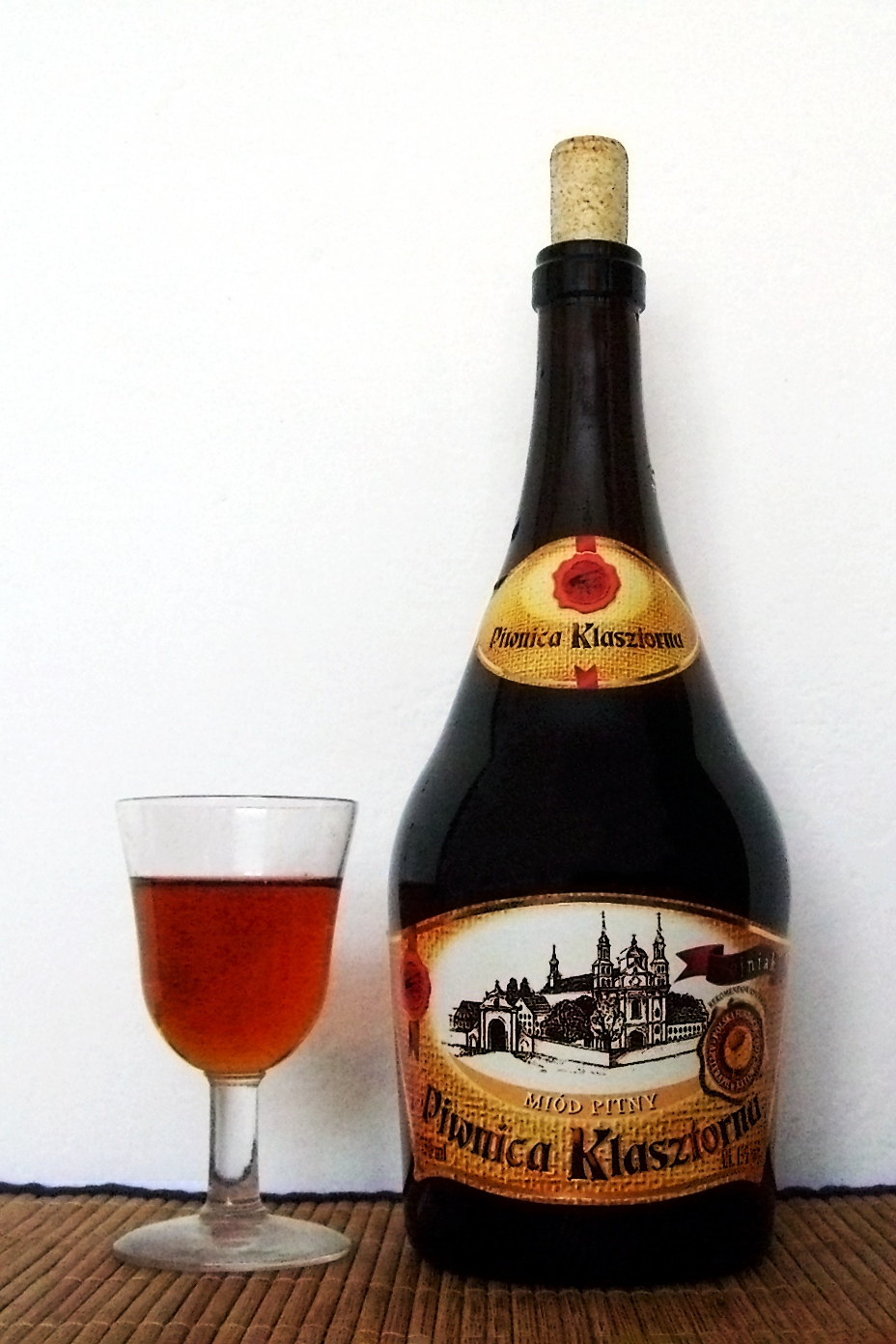
- A bottle and a glass of trójniak mead
- Type: Mead
- Origin: Poland
- Introduced: Middle Ages
- Alcohol by volume: 9–18%
- Colour: Golden to dark amber
- Flavour: Honey
- Ingredients: Honey, water
- Variants: Fruit, herbal, spiced

Mead (Polish: miód pitny [mʲjut ˈpʲitnɨ], literally "drinkable honey") is an alcoholic beverage within Polish culinary tradition made by alcoholic fermentation of a mixture of honey and water. It has a characteristic honey aroma and a flavour that may be enriched by the addition of fruit juices, herbs or spices. The colour ranges from golden to dark amber, depending on the type of honey used for production.

In 2008, four traditional Polish mead grades, which indicate the proportion of honey and water used in production, were registered by the European Union as a traditional speciality guaranteed. Production of mead in Poland almost doubled within the next four years, making Poland the world's largest producer of mead made according to traditional methods.

== Grades and varieties ==
Polish meads are traditionally and legally classified into four grades (czwórniak, trójniak, dwójniak, półtorak) depending on the ratio of honey and water used in production and the resulting sweetness and alcohol content. Their names come from the total number of parts by volume of honey and water, with one part being honey; for example, czwórniak is made from one part honey and three parts water, giving a total of four parts. The lower the total number of parts, the stronger, sweeter and more expensive the mead. Informal honey-to-water proportions, such as półtrzeciak (1:1.5) or sześciak (1:5), may be used in home production, but are not commercially available due to legal restrictions.

Polish mead grades
Grade	Polish pronunciation	Meaning	Honey-to-water ratio (vol:vol)	Alcohol content by volume	Reducing sugars after inversion	Sweetness	Min. ageing time
Czwórniak	[ˈt͡ʂfurɲak]	Four parts	1:3	9–12%	35–90 g/L	dry	9 months
Trójniak	[ˈtrujɲak]	Three parts	1:2	12–15%	65–120 g/L	semi-sweet	1 year
Dwójniak	[ˈdvujɲak]	Two parts	1:1	15–18%	175–230 g/L	sweet	2 years
Półtorak	[puwˈtɔrak]	One and a half parts	1:0.5 = 2:1	15–18%	> 300 g/L	dessert	3 years

Mead may be flavoured with fruit juices, producing fruit mead (miód owocowy), or with herbs and spices, giving herbal mead (miód ziołowy) or spiced mead (miód korzenny). Traditional varieties, distinguished according to the raw materials and natural additives used or to the method of ageing, include:

- agrestniak, flavoured with gooseberry juice;
- borówczak, flavoured with lingonberry juice;
- czereśniak, flavoured with sweet cherry juice;
- czerniak, flavoured with bilberry juice;
- dębniak, matured in oak barrels;
- dereniak, flavoured with Cornelian cherry juice;
- gruszeczniak, flavoured with pear juice;
- jabłczak, flavoured with apple juice;
- jarzębiak, flavoured with rowanberry juice;
- jeżyniak, flavoured with blackberry juice;
- kaliniak, flavoured with guelder rose juice;
- lipiec, made from linden honey;
- maliniak, flavoured with raspberry juice;
- miód chmielowy, flavoured with hops;
- miód gronowy, flavoured with grape juice;
- morwiak, flavoured with mulberry juice;
- porzeczniak, flavoured with currant juice;
- poziomczak, flavoured with woodland strawberry juice;
- śliwniak, flavoured with plum juice;
- wiśniak, flavoured with sour cherry juice.

Other popular flavouring ingredients include celery leaves, cinnamon, cloves, elderberries, ginger, juniper berries, rose oil and vanilla.

== Production ==
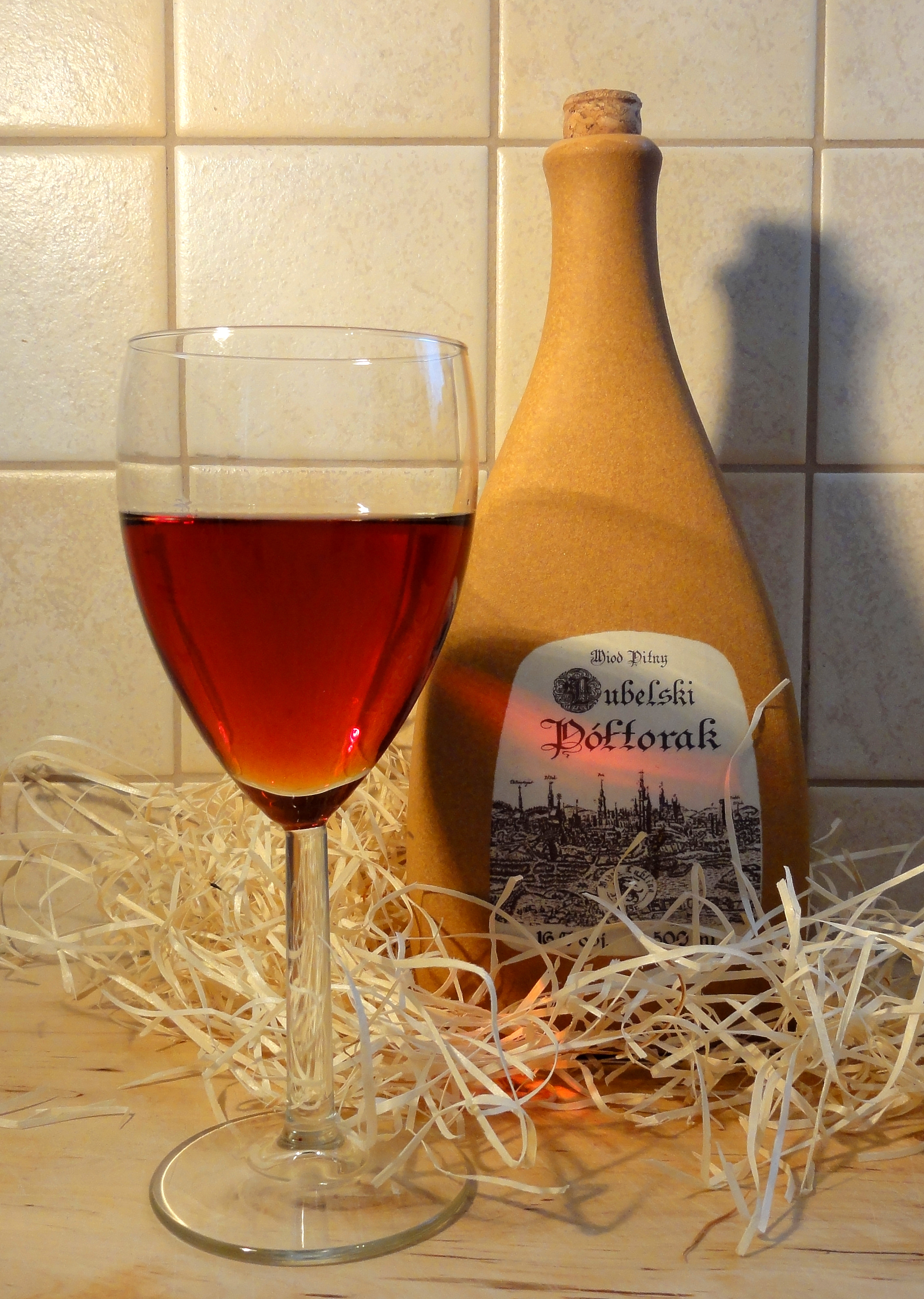
A stoneware bottle and a glass of półtorak mead

Mead is made by fermentation of must, which is a mixture of honey and water, the proportion of which depends on the required grade. In the cases of dwójniak and półtorak, the sugar concentration would be too high for the yeast to work in the fermentation process, so the must is prepared with one part honey to two parts water; the rest of the honey is added in the final stage of fermentation or during aging. For fruit meads, at least 30 percent of the water is replaced with fruit juice; herbs or spices may be added as well.

In commercial production, the must is usually boiled at a temperature of 95–105 °C, giving what is known in Polish as miód sycony (saturated mead). The required extract is obtained in a kettle fitted with a steam jacket. This method of brewing prevents caramelization of the sugars. Miód niesycony (unsaturated mead) is also made, especially in home production, wherein the must is made by mixing honey with room temperature or warm water, without boiling, allowing to retain more of the honey aroma.

In order to guarantee the microbiological safety of the boiled must, it is cooled on the same day to 20–22 °C, the optimum temperature for yeast to propagate. A yeast solution is then added to the must in a fermentation tank in a process known as "pitching". Violent fermentation takes 6–10 days. Keeping the temperature at a maximum level of 28 °C ensures that the fermentation process runs properly. This is followed by still fermentation, which takes 3–6 weeks. At this stage, it is possible to add the remaining quantity of honey to achieve the proportion required for dwójniak or półtorak.

After obtaining an alcohol content of at least 12 percent by volume, the mead undergoes racking prior to aging. Leaving the pitched must on the lees beyond the still fermentation period would adversely affect the mead's organoleptic properties because of yeast autolysis. Aging (maturing) and siphoning (decantation) is repeated as necessary to prevent unwanted processes from taking place in the lees. During aging, it is possible to carry out pasteurization and filtration. This stage is essential for ensuring that the product has the right organoleptic properties.

The flavor of the final product may be adjusted by adding honey to sweeten the mead, addition of herbs and spices or ethanol of agricultural origin. Bottling takes place at a temperature of 18–25 °C. Traditional carboys, ceramic bottles or oak barrels are typically used.

== Serving ==
In Poland, mead is most commonly served at room temperature in a glass or a stoneware cup. Depending on the weather, it may be also drunk chilled to about 12°C or warm. On a hot day, chilled mead may be served with mint or a lemon slice. In winter some Poles enjoy mulled mead, which may be additionally flavoured with cloves, cinnamon, vanilla, ginger, black pepper or a slice of orange.

== History ==
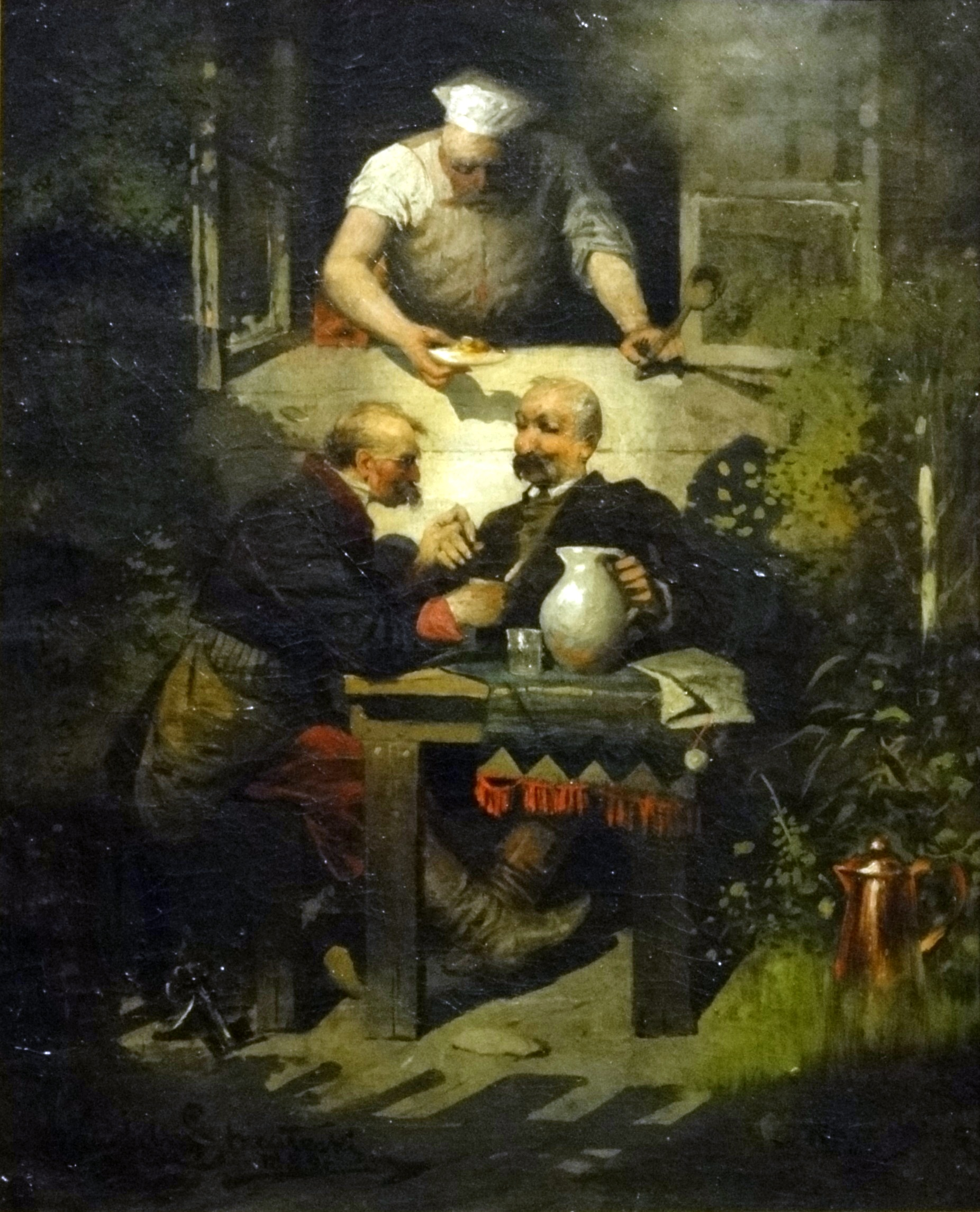
Early-19th-century Polish noblemen enjoying mead in a painting inspired by Pan Tadeusz. Painted by Wandalin Strzałecki in 1884.

Mead production and consumption in Poland is a tradition that stretches back for centuries. In the Middle Ages, Poland was covered with primeval forests, which the 12th-century chronicler Gallus Anonymus described as "flowing with honey". (Note: Polish: las miodopłynny.) This abundance of honey and a climate ill-suited for grape growing meant that mead was long more popular than wine. In 996, the Sephardi Jewish traveller Ibrahim ibn Yaqub wrote that "besides food, meat and land for ploughing, the country of Mieszko I abounds in mead, which is what the Slavic wines and intoxicating drinks are called". In the 15th century, the Venetian diplomat Ambrogio Contarini observed that "having no wine, [the Poles] make a certain drink out of honey, which intoxicates people much more than wine." (Note: Polish: Nie mając wina robią pewien napój z miodu, który upija ludzi znacznie bardziej niż wino.) The 16th-century Polish poet Sebastian Klonowic praised the "nutritious and healthy" mead of Ruthenia (then part of Poland, now in western Ukraine) as a "nectar" worthy of Olympian gods, as opposed to wine.

Wine comes from the earth muddy and grey,
Mead must be sent down straight from the heavens. (Note: Polish:Wino jest z ziemi błotnistej i szarej, Miód prosto z niebios spuszczony być musi.)

Notwithstanding the popular notion that mead used to be the everyday drink in Poland, it has always been a luxury good, reserved for special occasions, such as weddings, and available only to the affluent, while beer was the daily thirst quencher of the common people. Mead was valuable enough to be deemed a suitable gift for monasteries and dignitaries.

The oldest known recipe for mead was recorded in 1567 by the Swedish chronicler Olaus Magnus, who obtained it from a native of the Polish city of Gniezno. According to it, ten pounds of honey were to be boiled with forty pounds of water, flavoured with hops and fermented with beer yeast or bread starter. As well as with hops, 17th-century Polish mead was flavoured with fennel, pepper, cloves, cinnamon, anise, poppy seeds or parsley. Source materials describing Polish culinary traditions of the 17th and 18th centuries contain not only general mentions of mead, but also references to different types of it. The terms czwórniak, trójniak, dwójniak and półtorak date back to this period. Mead was produced and served in meaderies, known in Polish as miodosytnie, which were marked with a red cross above the door to distinguish them from beerhouses, marked with a straw wisp, and from wineshops, marked with a wreath.

Around the 17th century mead started to lose popularity to wine imported from the south, especially from Hungary, and domestically produced vodka. In the 19th century it came to be associated with the bygone times of pre-partition Poland, as evidenced by its mentions in the Polish national epic poem Pan Tadeusz by Adam Mickiewicz, in the poems of Tomasz Zan and in the Trilogy of historical novels by Henryk Sienkiewicz.

== Market ==
In 2008, the four legally recognized grades were registered by the European Union as a traditional speciality guaranteed under the names czwórniak staropolski tradycyjny, trójniak staropolski tradycyjny, dwójniak staropolski tradycyjny and półtorak staropolski tradycyjny (where staropolski tradycyjny means "traditional Old Polish"). Within the next four years the production of mead in Poland almost doubled from 760,000 litres in 2008 to 1.4 million litres in 2013, when Poland became the world's largest producer of mead made with traditional methods.

Despite a long-standing tradition of mead consumption, the beverage is a niche product in Poland. In 2013, about 600,000 litres of mead were sold in Poland, compared with 142.5 million litres of wine sold during the same period. Mead amounted to 0.5 percent of total alcohol consumption in Poland in 2013. Only nine percent of adult Poles polled that year declared that they had drunk mead at least once in the last three months; 27 percent said they had enjoyed mead in the last 12 months. Those who drank mead, did so mostly at family or social gatherings. A majority of those who did not, said there had been no occasion for it.

Polish mead producers expect little growth of domestic demand, which stood at 8 percent per year in 2013, and focus instead on exports, as demand for Polish mead is growing on external markets at a rate of 15–20 percent per year. Mead produced in Poland is exported to Western Europe, Australia, China, Japan, Mexico and the United States.

== See also ==
- Beer in Poland
- Polish wine

== Sources ==
This article incorporates some text from the Publication pursuant to Article 26(2) of Regulation (EU) No 1151/2012 of the European Parliament and of the Council on quality schemes for agricultural products and foodstuffs as regards a name of traditional speciality guaranteed 52016XC0527(01) as published by EUR-Lex. According to the website's copyright notice, "except where otherwise stated, reuse of the EUR-Lex data for commercial or non-commercial purposes is authorised provided the source is acknowledged ('© European Union, http://eur-lex.europa.eu/, 1998–2016'). The reuse policy of the European Commission is implemented by the Commission Decision of 12 December 2011."
- Bernatek, Andrzej; Wiśniewski, Tomasz (2014). The alcoholic beverages market in Poland (PDF) (Report). KPMG.
- Besala, Jerzy (2015). Alkoholowe dzieje Polski: Czasy Piastów i Rzeczypospolitej szlacheckiej [Alcoholic History of Poland: Times of the House of Piast and the Noblemen's Commonwealth] (in Polish). Poznań: Zysk i S-ka Wydawnictwo. ISBN 978-83-7785-285-9.
- Bodył, Tomasz (2016-01-27). "Ten alkohol to prawdziwy hit na prezent!" [This alcohol is a real hit as a gift!] (in Polish). Fakt24.pl.
- Dembińska, Maria (1999). Weaver, William Woys (ed.). Food and Drink in Medieval Poland: Rediscovering a Cuisine of the Past. Philadelphia: University of Pennsylvania Press. ISBN 0-8122-3224-0.
- Document 52016XC0527(01). 27 May 2016.
- Fatyga, Adrian. "Polska miodem stała" [Poland used to live on mead] (Interview) (in Polish). Interviewed by Dawid Brandebura. Smaki z Polski.
- Ferenc, Marek (2008). "Czasy nowożytne" [Early modern times]. In Chwalba, Andrzej (ed.). Obyczaje w Polsce: Od średniowiecza do czasów współczesnych [Customs of Poland: From the Middle Ages to Modern Times] (in Polish). Warszawa: Wydawnictwo Naukowe PWN. ISBN 978-83-01-14253-7.
- Gloger, Zygmunt (1900). Encyklopedja Staropolska [Old Polish Encyclopedia] (in Polish). Warszawa: P. Laskauer i W. Babicki.
- Klonowic, Sebastian Fabian. Ziemie Czerwonej Rusi [The Lands of Red Ruthenia] (in Polish).
- Korczak, Lidia (2008). "Wieki średnie" [Middle Ages]. In Chwalba, Andrzej (ed.). Obyczaje w Polsce: Od średniowiecza do czasów współczesnych [Customs of Poland: From the Middle Ages to Modern Times] (in Polish). Warszawa: Wydawnictwo Naukowe PWN. ISBN 978-83-01-14253-7.
- Lewandowska, Dorota. "Czym Sarmata mógł ugasić pragnienie?" [What could a Sarmatian quench his thirst with?]. Silva Rerum (in Polish). Muzeum Pałacu Króla Jana III w Wilanowie.
- Lewicki, Kazimierz (1902-04-11). "Rozmaite sposoby sycenia miodu" [Various methods of mead brewing]. Dobra Gospodyni (in Polish) (15). Warszawa: 115–117.
- Libera, Paweł (2013-07-19). "Oto najstarszy alkoholowy napój na świecie. Jak należy go pić? I czy wszystkie miody są bardzo słodkie?" [This is the oldest alcoholic drink in the world. How to drink it? Are all meads very sweet?] (Interview) (in Polish). Interviewed by Karolina Głowacka. Gazeta.pl.
- [M FOOD] Skrócone skonsolidowane i jednostkowe sprawozdanie finansowe M FOOD S.A. za czwarty kwartał 2016 r. [Condensed consolidated and unitary financial statement of M FOOD S.A. for the fourth quarter of 2016] (PDF) (Report). Łódź: M FOOD. 2017-02-14.
- "Ogólna charakterystyka miodów pitnych" [General characteristics of mead] (in Polish). Pasieka Jaros. Archived from the original on 2022-05-20.
- Surzycka-Mliczewska, Zofia, ed. (2005). Kuchnia polska [Polish Cuisine] (in Polish). Warszawa: Polskie Wydawnictwo Ekonomiczne. ISBN 83-208-1556-8.
