= Prague ham =

Type of boneless ham originally from Prague

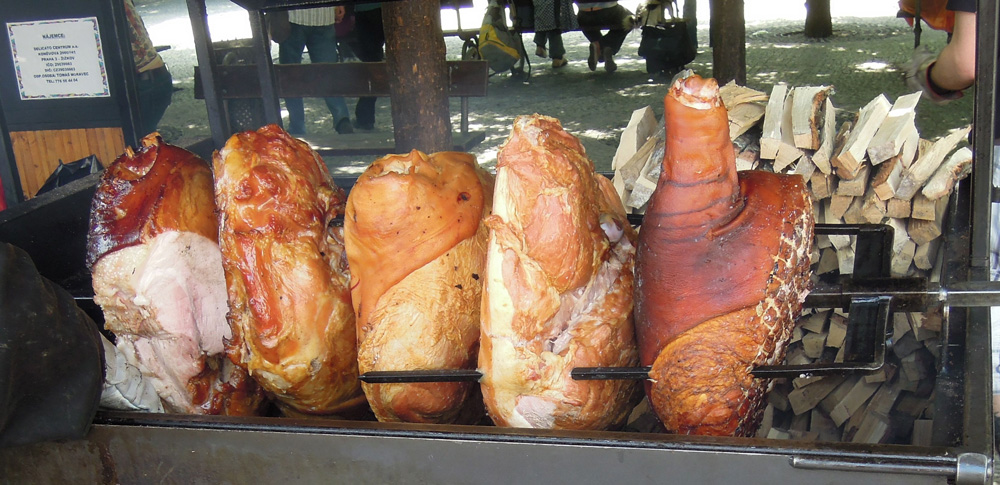
Prague ham on a stall at the Old Town Square in Prague

Prague ham (Czech: Pražská šunka) is a type of brine-cured, stewed, and mildly beechwood-smoked boneless ham originally from Prague in Bohemia (now the Czech Republic). When cooked on the bone, it is called šunka od kosti (lit. 'ham from the bone'), considered a delicacy. It was first marketed in the 1860s by Antonín Chmel, a pork butcher from Prague's Zvonařka Street.

It was a popular export during the 1920s and 1930s, to the point that other cultures started copying the recipe and making it domestically. Pražská šunka/Prague ham is registered as a Traditional Speciality Guaranteed in the European Union and the United Kingdom and can only be produced according to a specified procedure.

== As street food ==
Prague ham is traditionally served in restaurants and from street vendors with a side of boiled potatoes and often accompanied by Czech beer.

== Names in other languages ==
The following translations are registered for the Traditional Speciality Guaranteed:

- Bulgarian: Пражка шунка
- Czech and Slovak: Pražská šunka
- Danish: Pragskinke
- Dutch: Praagse Ham
- Estonian: Praha sink
- Finnish: Prahalainen kinkku
- French: Jambon de Prague
- German: Prager Schinken
- Greek: Χοιρομέρι Πράγας
- Hungarian: Prágai sonka
- Italian: Prosciutto di Praga
- Latvian: Prāgas šķiņķis
- Maltese: Perżut ta' Praga
- Norwegian: Pragerskinke
- Polish: Szynka Praska
- Portuguese: Fiambre de Praga
- Romanian: Șuncă de Praga
- Serbo-Croatian and Slovene: Praška šunka
- Serbian: Прашка шунка
- Spanish: Jamón de Praga
- Swedish: Pragskinka

== See also ==
- Czech cuisine
- List of hams
