= Skilandis =

Lithuanian sausage

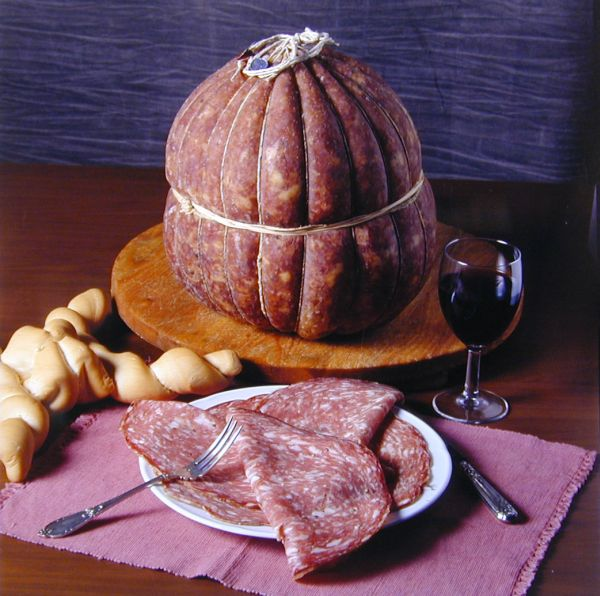
Skilandis

Skilandis or Kindziukas is a Lithuanian matured sausage made of meat, fat, salt, pepper and garlic. The ground meat is traditionally pressed into a pig's stomach or bladder, but today may be contained in other skins. The sausage is dried and cold-smoked. Skilandis dates back to at least the 16th century - the word skilandis is referred to in documents from various locations across the Grand Duchy of Lithuania as early as in the 16th-18th centuries.

The term Lietuviškas skilandis has been protected as a Traditional Speciality Guaranteed. Originally, the term Skilandis was proposed, but following a national opposition procedure, the name was changed to Lietuviškas skilandis.

== See also ==
- Haggis
- Chireta
- Saumagen
- List of sausages
- List of smoked foods
