= Cocido =

Dish made of various meats and vegetables of Spanish and Portuguese origins

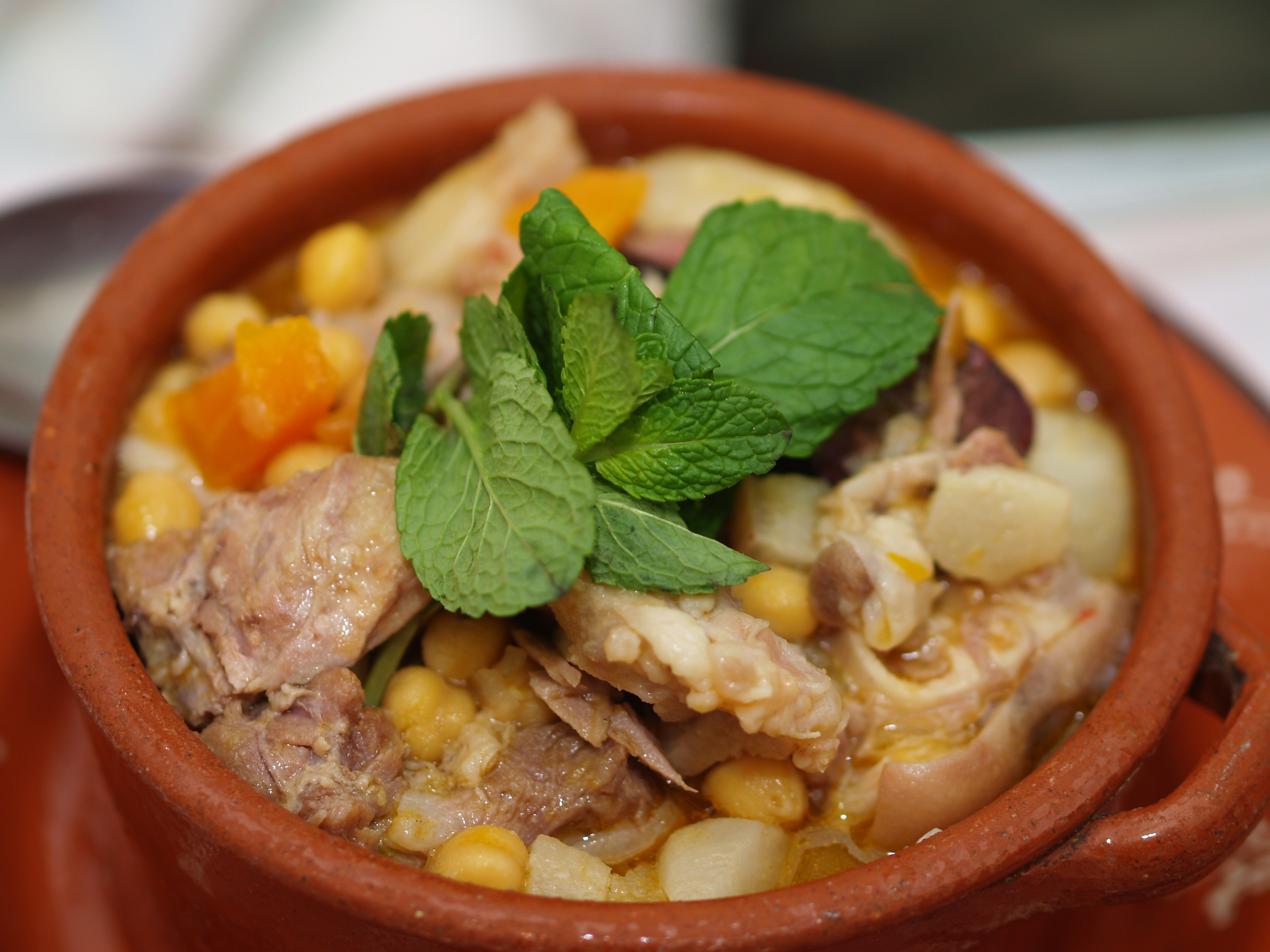
- Portuguese cozido de grão (chickpea cozido)
- Alternative names: Cozido
- Type: Stew
- Place of origin: Iberian Peninsula
- Variations: Cocido madrileño, cocido montañés, cocido maragato, cocido de pelotas, cocido andaluz, cocido de Lalín, berza gaditana, cocido lebaniego, cozido à portuguesa

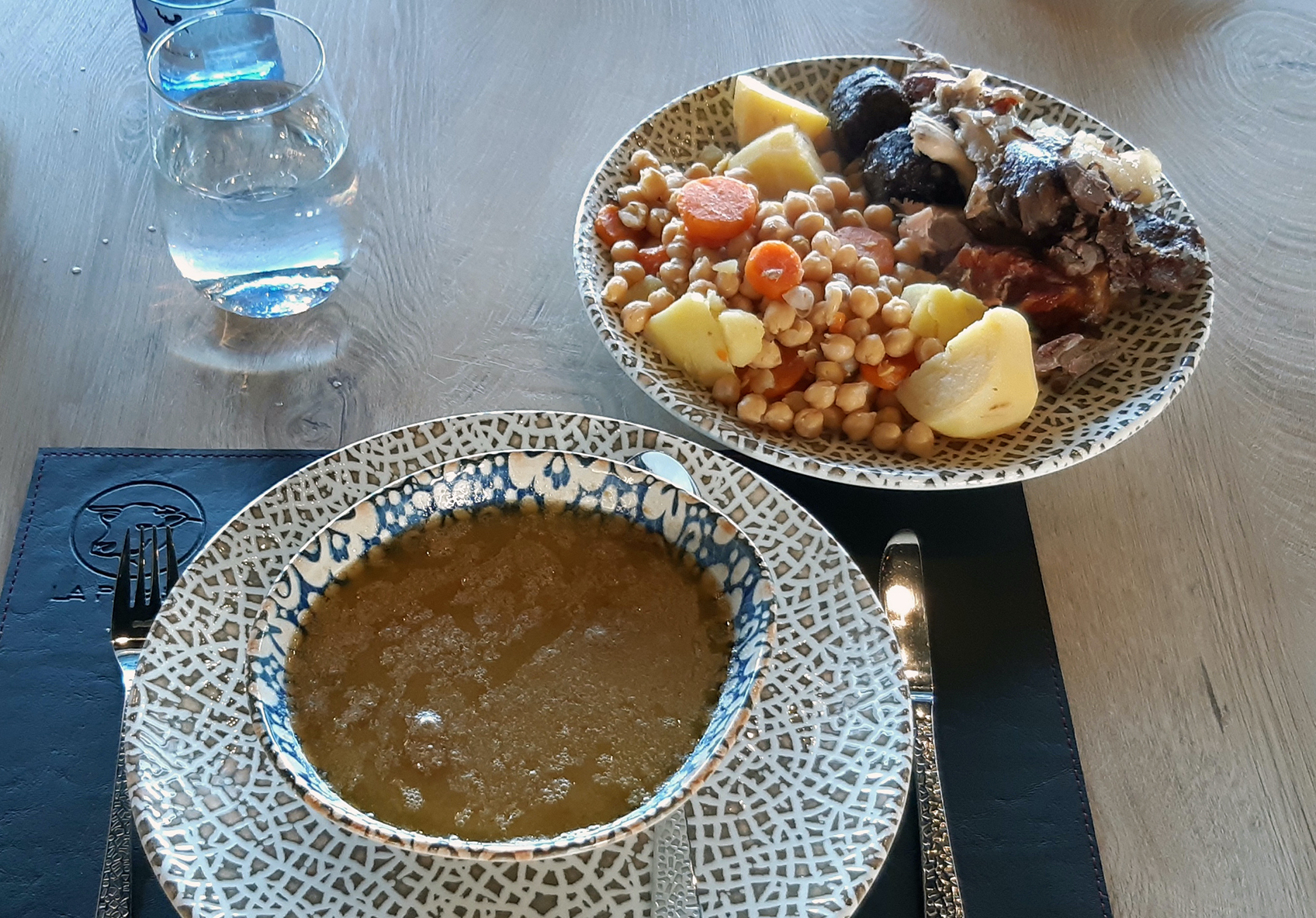
Cocido madrileño

Cocido (Spanish: [koˈθiðo]) (Note: Latin American Spanish: [koˈsiðo]) or cozido (Portuguese: [kuˈziðu]) (Note: Brazilian Portuguese: [koˈzidu]) is a traditional stew eaten as a main dish in Spain, Portugal, Brazil and other Hispanophone and Lusophone countries.

== Etymology ==
In Spanish, cocido is the past participle of the verb cocer ("to boil"), so it literally means "boiled [thing]". In Portuguese, the word cozido means "cooked", "boiled" or "baked", being the past participle of the verb cozer ("to cook", "to boil", or "to bake").

== Preparation and ingredients ==
Cocido is made of various meats (pork, beef, chicken, and mutton), embutidos and vegetables like cabbage, turnips, parsnips, potatoes, carrots and chickpeas (garbanzos). Other foods (such as eggs or cheese) can be added before serving. Due to the wide regional diversity of the dish, the word cocido is typically followed by the place of origin (e.g., madrileño, maragato, lebaniego, galego).

The basic method of preparation involves slow cooking over low heat. Cozido may be prepared with a wide variety of vegetables, meats, fish, and seafood. Ingredients vary across regions.

=== Portuguese cozido ===
==== Cozido à portuguesa ====
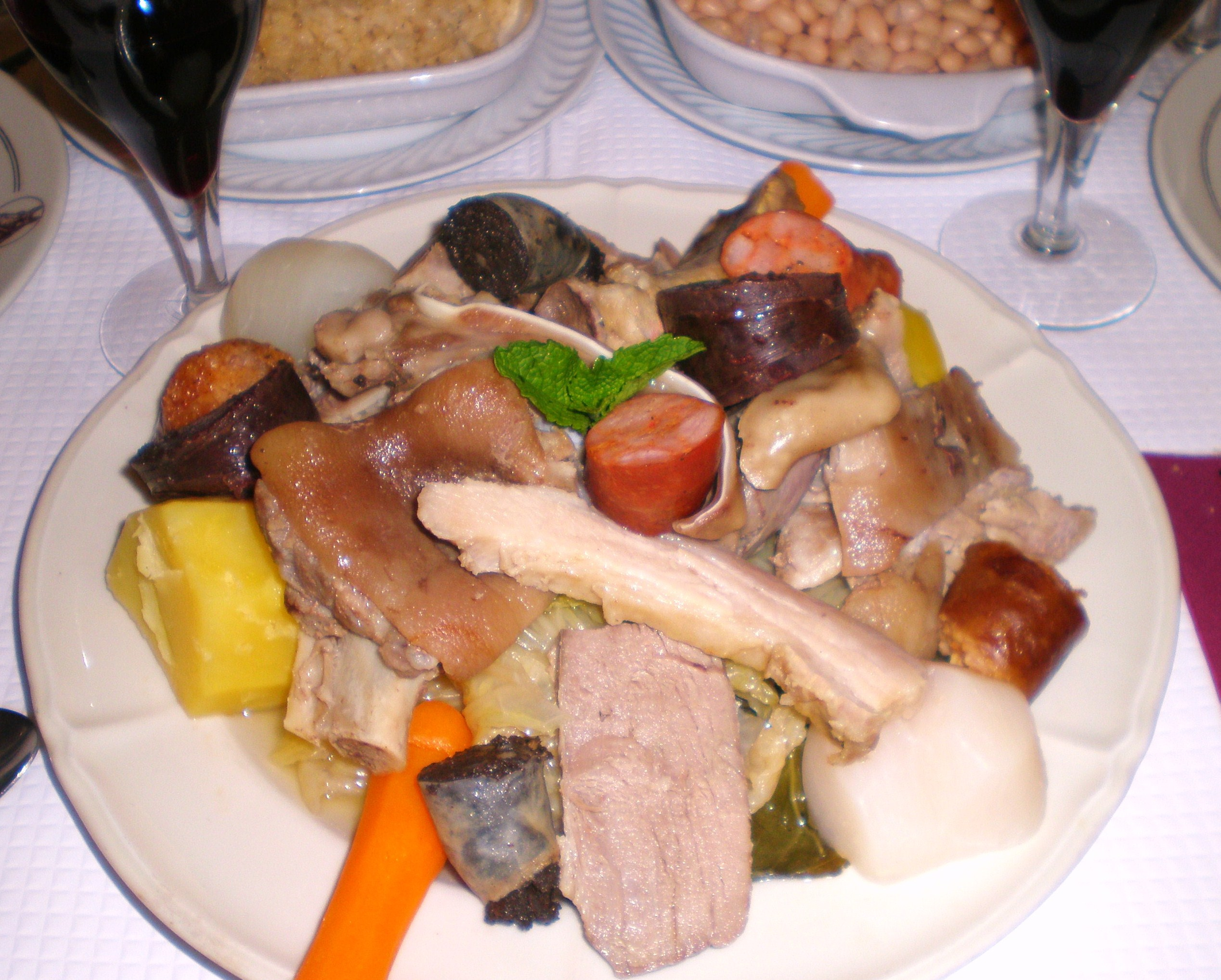
Cozido à portuguesa (Portuguese stew) plate

In Portugal, cozido à portuguesa is prepared with several vegetables (beans, potatoes, carrots, turnips, cabbages, rice), meat (chicken, pork ribs, bacon, pork ear and trotters, various parts of beef), smoked sausages (chouriço, farinheira, morcela, blood sausage), and other ingredients. Numerous regional variations exist throughout Portugal, and the dish is considered part of the Portuguese heritage.

It is a rich stew that usually includes beef shin, pork, assorted offal, Portuguese smoked sausages (morcela, farinheira and chouriço) and in some regions chicken, served with cabbage, carrots, turnips, rice, potatoes, and collard greens.

==== Cozido de grão ====
Cozido de grão is prepared with chickpeas as the main ingredient.

==== Cozido das Furnas ====
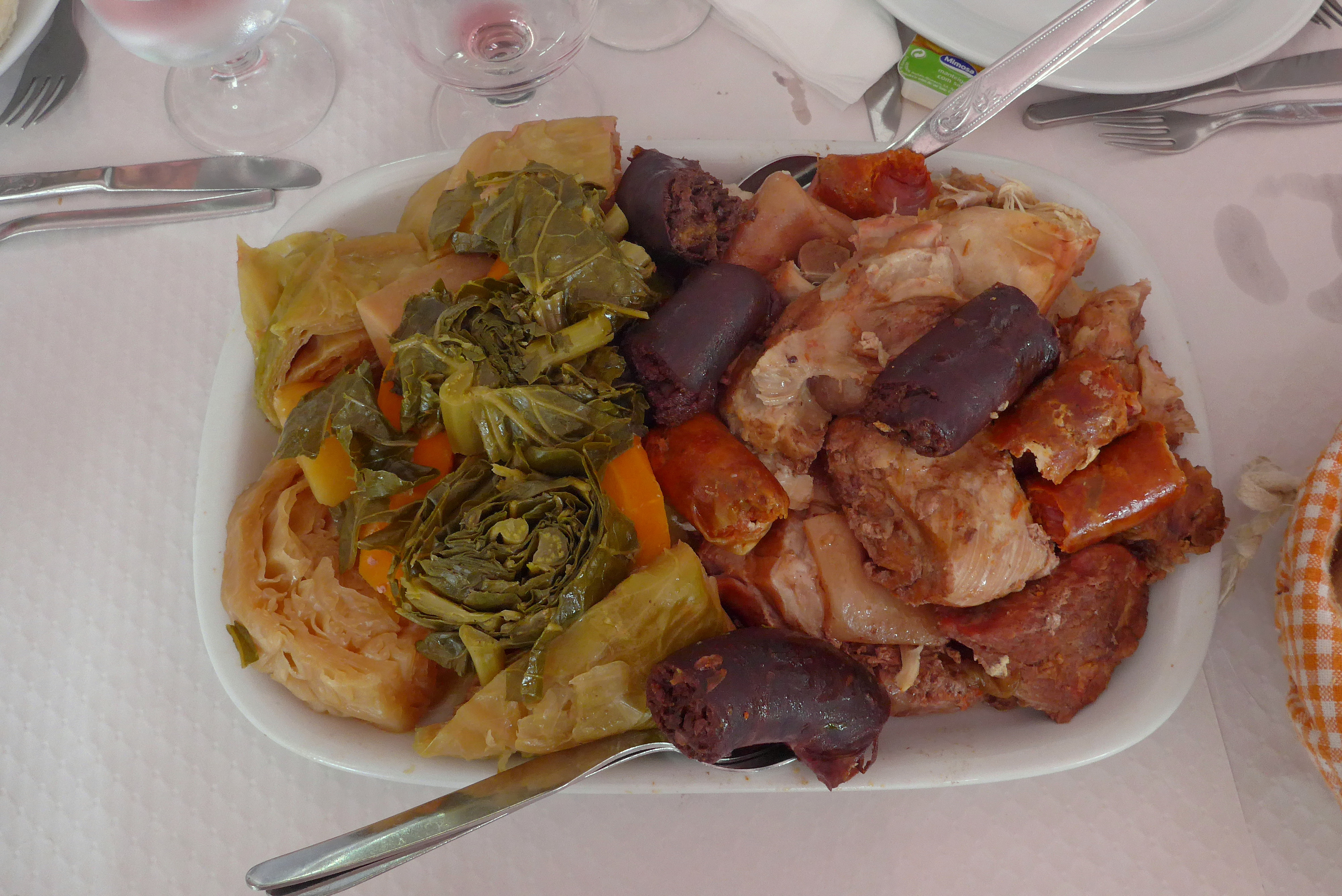
Cozido das Furnas

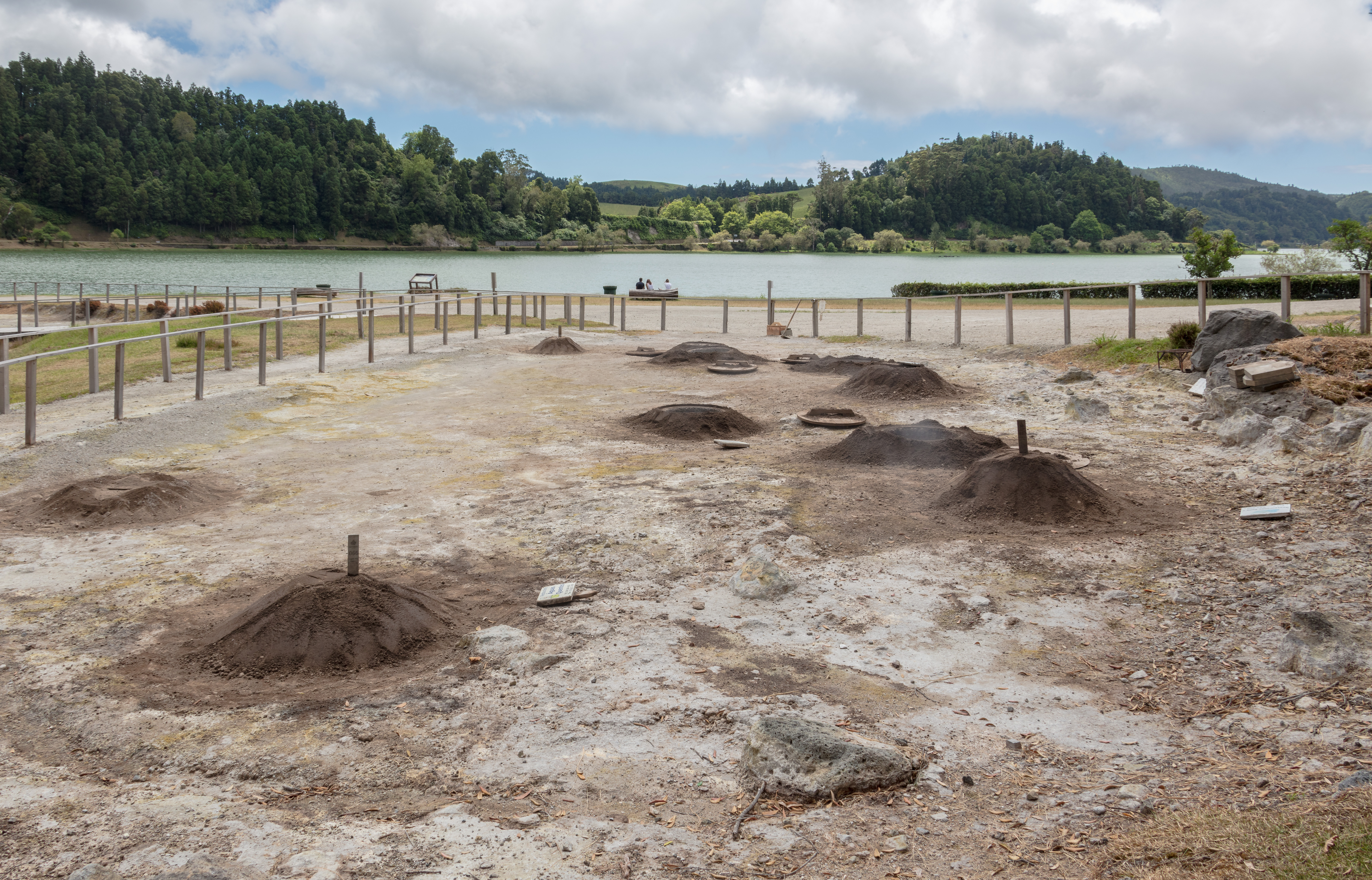
Cozido das Furnas being cooked in a volcanic fumerole on São Miguel Island. The mounds contain the sealed cooking container with the ingredients.

On São Miguel Island in the Azores, cozido is a beef-forward dish known as cozido das Furnas. It is buried in the fumeroles of Lagoa das Furnas and cooked underground for four to five hours.

=== Brazilian cozido ===
In Brazil, potatoes, sweet potatoes, carrots, and cassava are commonly used. Bananas can also be included in Brazilian cozido dishes.

== See also ==
- Escudella i carn d'olla
- Bollito misto
- Caldeirada
- Cassoulet
- Cazuela
- Cholent – Ashkenazi Jewish Sabbath stew
- Olla podrida
- Pot-au-feu
- Ragout
- List of stews
