= Asturian cuisine =

Culinary tradition of the Austrias region of Spain

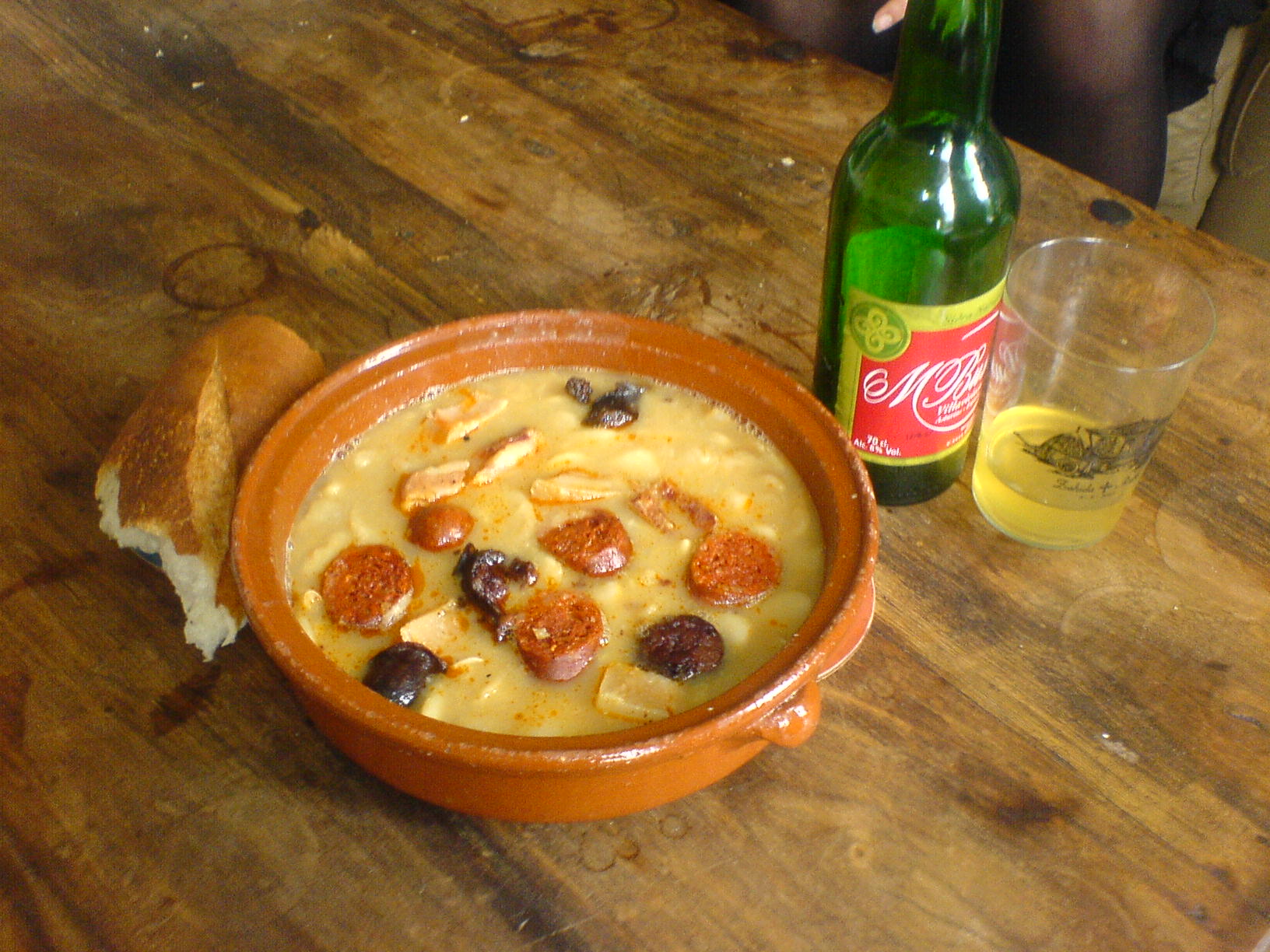
Fabada asturiana with sidra, a typical dish of Asturias

Asturian cuisine refers to the typical dishes and ingredients found in the cuisine of the Asturias region of Spain.

== Food ==
Asturias is especially known for its seafood, such as fresh squid, crab, shrimp and sea bass. Salmon are caught in Asturian rivers, notably the Sella; the first fish of the season is called campanu, a bell tolled to signal the first catch.

=== Bread ===
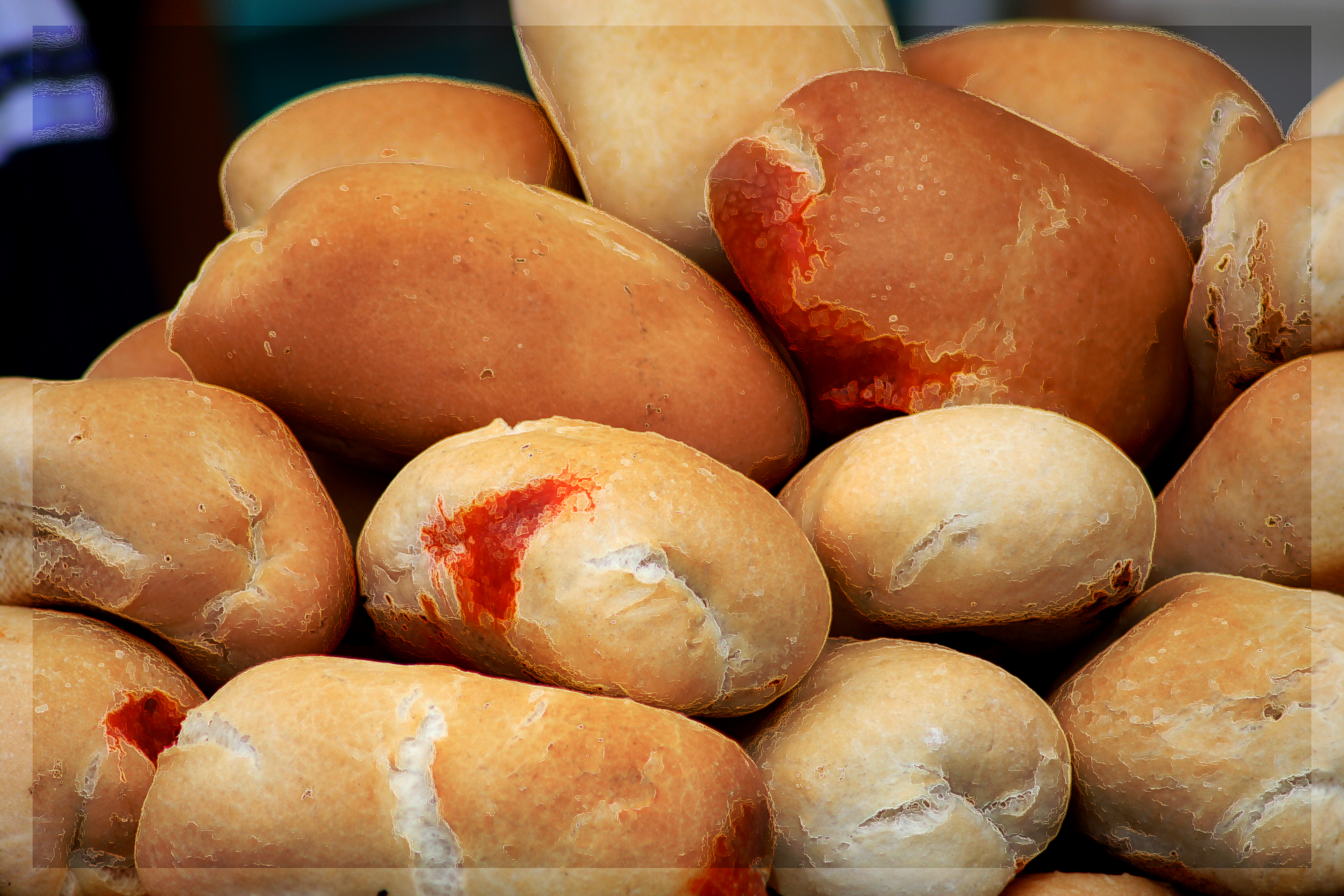
Bollos preñaos

Spelt bread (pan d'escanda) is very traditional. Formigos are a type of French toast made with crumbled bread and eggs. Bollos preñaos are buns filled with chorizo. Pancakes called frixuelos, similar to Galician filloas, are typical desserts. Other specialities are made with cornmeal, such as boroña (round loaf of hard bread), the fariñes, farrapes or papes (cornmeal porridge), the rapa (similar to boroña with pieces of bacon inside the dough) and tortos (cornmeal flatbread).

=== Fruits, vegetables and legumes ===
The most common legume in Asturian cuisine is beans ("fabes"), the main element in the iconic fabada stew, one of the most well-known Asturian dishes, apart from other dishes such as beans and clams (fabes con amasueles). Another rich stew is pote asturianu, with cabbage, potatoes, beans and pork products. Turnips are found in pote de nabos (turnip stew), a typical winter dish, just as chestnuts in the more humble pote de castañes (chestnut stew). Green beans, peas, potatoes, peppers, cauliflower and other vegetables are also common. Mushrooms from the Asturian forests are also found, such as fairy ring mushrooms, oyster mushrooms, and parasol mushrooms.

Among fruits, apples are most important (an indispensable element for making Asturian cider, there being several autochthonous varieties). Cherries, strawberries and figs (such as figos miguelinos) are also quite typical, as well as chestnuts, walnuts and hazelnuts.

=== Cheeses ===
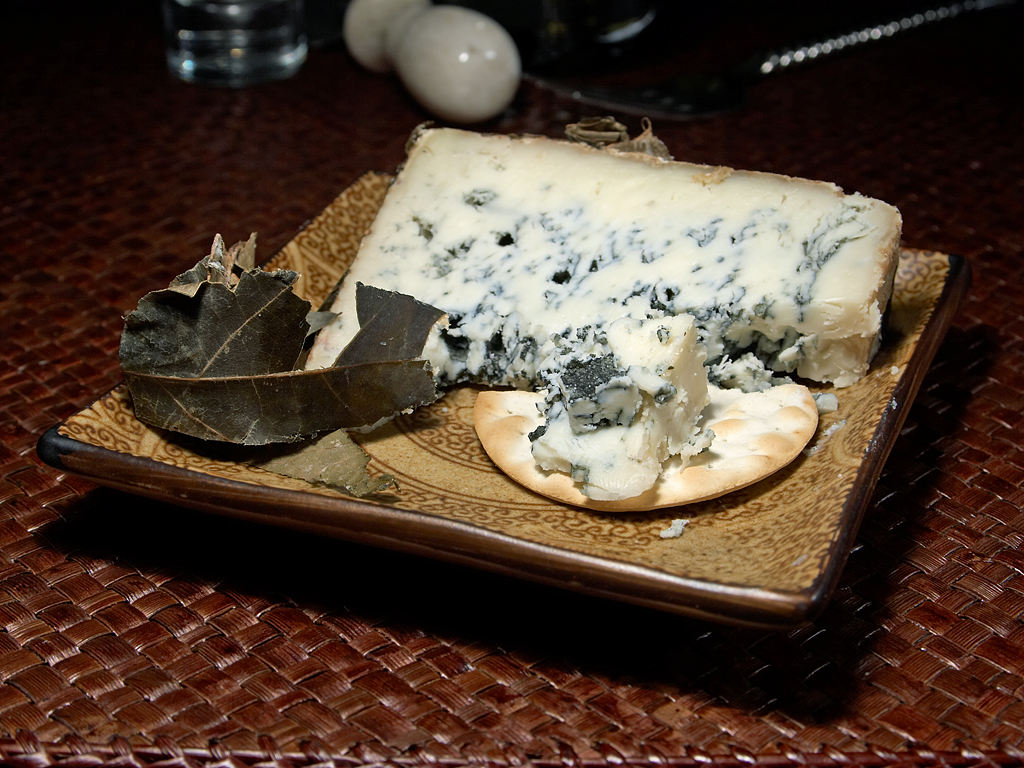
Queso de Cabrales

Asturian cheeses, especially Cabrales, are also famous throughout Spain and beyond; Cabrales is known for its pungent odour and strong flavour. Asturias is often called "the land of cheeses" (el pais de los quesos) due to the product's diversity and quality in this region. Other famous cheeses are:

- Afuega'l pitu
- Quesu de los Beyos
- Casín cheese
- Gamonéu cheese
- La Peral cheese

== Dishes ==
The most famous regional dish is fabada Asturiana, a rich stew made with the Asturian typical large white beans (fabes de la Granja), pork shoulder (llacón), morcilla, chorizo, and saffron (azafrán).

Other major dishes include beans with clams (fabes con almejas), Asturian stew, Cachopo, frixuelos, and rice pudding.

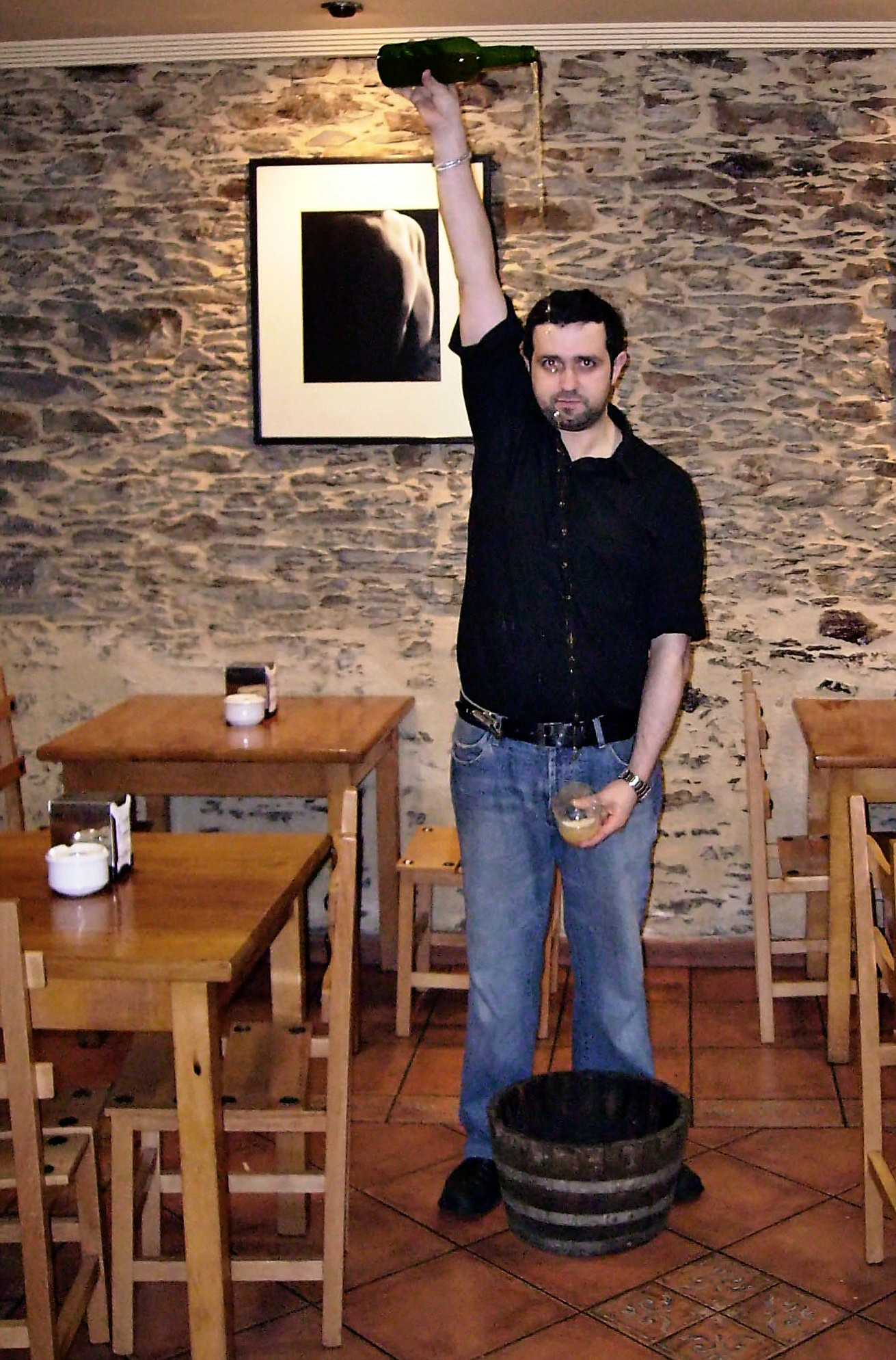
Asturian cider being poured in the traditional manner.

== Beverages ==
Apple groves foster the production of the traditional alcoholic drink, a natural cider (sidra). It is a very dry cider, and unlike French or English natural ciders, uses predominantly acidic apples, rather than sweet or bittersweet. The proportions are: acidic 40%, sub-acidic 30-25%, sweet 10-15%, bittersweet 15-20%, bitter 5%. The apples are fermented in stainless steel or more traditionally large oak or chestnut tanks.

Sidra is traditionally poured or "thrown" by an expert server (or escanciador): the bottle is raised high above their head to oxygenate the Sidra as it moves into the glass below. The glass is also held at a slight angle. A small amount (~120ml) is poured at a time (called a "culín"), as it must be drunk immediately before the sidra loses its carbonation. Any sidra left in the glass is poured onto a woodchip-strewn floor or a trough along the bottom of the bar.

== See also ==
- Spanish cuisine
- Galician cuisine
- Atlantic diet
