= Cocido montañés =

Spanish bean stew

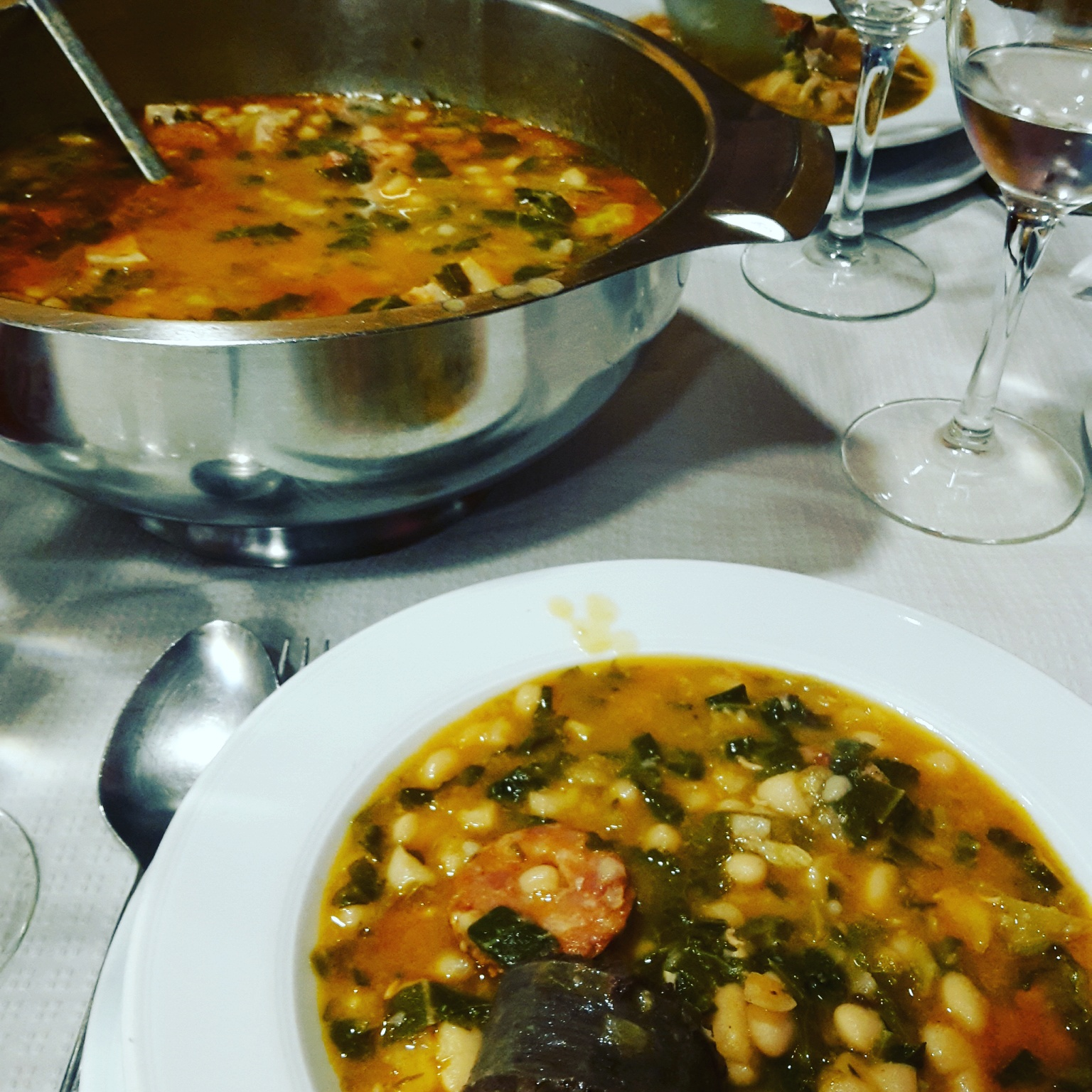
- Cocido montañés
- Alternative names: Puchera montañesa Potaje
- Type: Stew
- Course: Main course
- Place of origin: Spain
- Region or state: Cantabria
- Serving temperature: Hot
- Main ingredients: White beans, collard greens, pork
- Variations: Cocido lebaniego, fabada asturiana, olla podrida, cassoulet

Cocido montañés (translated as 'Mountain stew' or 'Cantabrian stew', depending on context) is a rich hearty Spanish bean stew, originally from and most commonly found in Cantabria in northern Spain.

Cocido montañés is a warm and heavy dish whose origin is the 17th century and it was cooked to fight against the cold and wet climate in the Cantabrian Mountains. For that reason it is most commonly eaten during winter and at the largest meal of the day, lunch. The pig is killed during the autumn and preserved to be used during winter. As it is a heavy, high-calorie meal, it is served as a main course.

== Ingredients ==
Cocido montañés is made with two vegetable ingredients: dried large white beans (alubia blanca, soaked overnight before use) and collard greens (berza). Some recipes use local red bean caricu montañés instead of white beans or cabbage instead of hard-to-find collard greens. The rest of the elements of this recipe are known as compangu which refers to the meat ingredients from the pig slaughter: bacon (tocino), pork ribs (costilla), blood sausage (morcilla) and sausage (chorizo).

== See also ==
- Cassoulet
- Cocido lebaniego
- Cocido madrileño
- Cozido à portuguesa
- Fabada asturiana
- Feijoada
- Baked beans
- Common bean (Phaseolus vulgaris)
- Olla podrida
- Pork and beans
- Cantabrian cuisine
