= Cocido madrileño =

Spanish chickpea-based stew

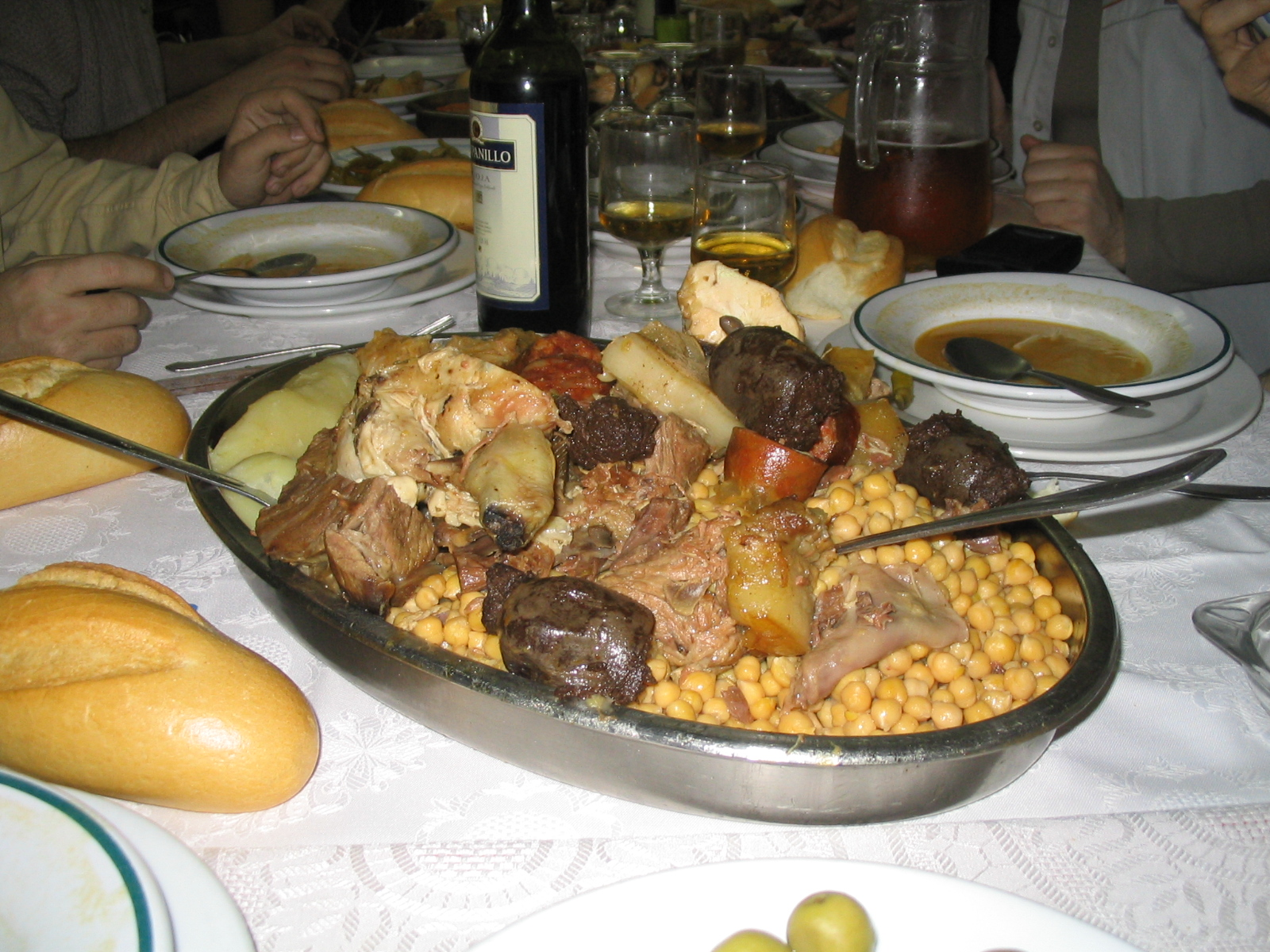
- Part of a cocido serving, with chickpeas, vegetables and meat
- Course: Main course
- Place of origin: Spain
- Region or state: Madrid region
- Serving temperature: Hot
- Main ingredients: Chickpeas

Cocido madrileño (Spanish: [koˈθiðo maðɾiˈleɲo]; "Madrilenian stew") is a traditional chickpea-based stew associated with the Madrid region. It is most popular during the winter. Long-cooking cocidos are thought to be derived from Sephardic adafina recipes.

== History ==
The origins of the dish are uncertain, but most sources agree that probably it was created during the Middle Ages as an evolution of the Sephardic Jewish dish adafina. Long-cooking dishes were indispensable for Jews as they allowed hearty meals during Shabbat. These first versions were kosher, using eggs and without pork.

Societal discrimination against conversos in early Modern Iberia and the subsequent fear of being denounced as a crypto-Jew favoured the incorporation of pork into meals. Soon lard, bacon, chorizo (pork sausage) and morcilla (blood sausage) were added to the dish.

From these origins, the recipe allowed few modifications and was soon established as a staple of Madrid cuisine. During the growth of the city in the 19th and 20th centuries, its low cost and heartiness made it a popular order in small restaurants and the taverns catering to manual workers. After the Civil War, the austerity period, followed by the introduction of more convenient meals, reduced the public popularity of the dish.

== Ingredients ==
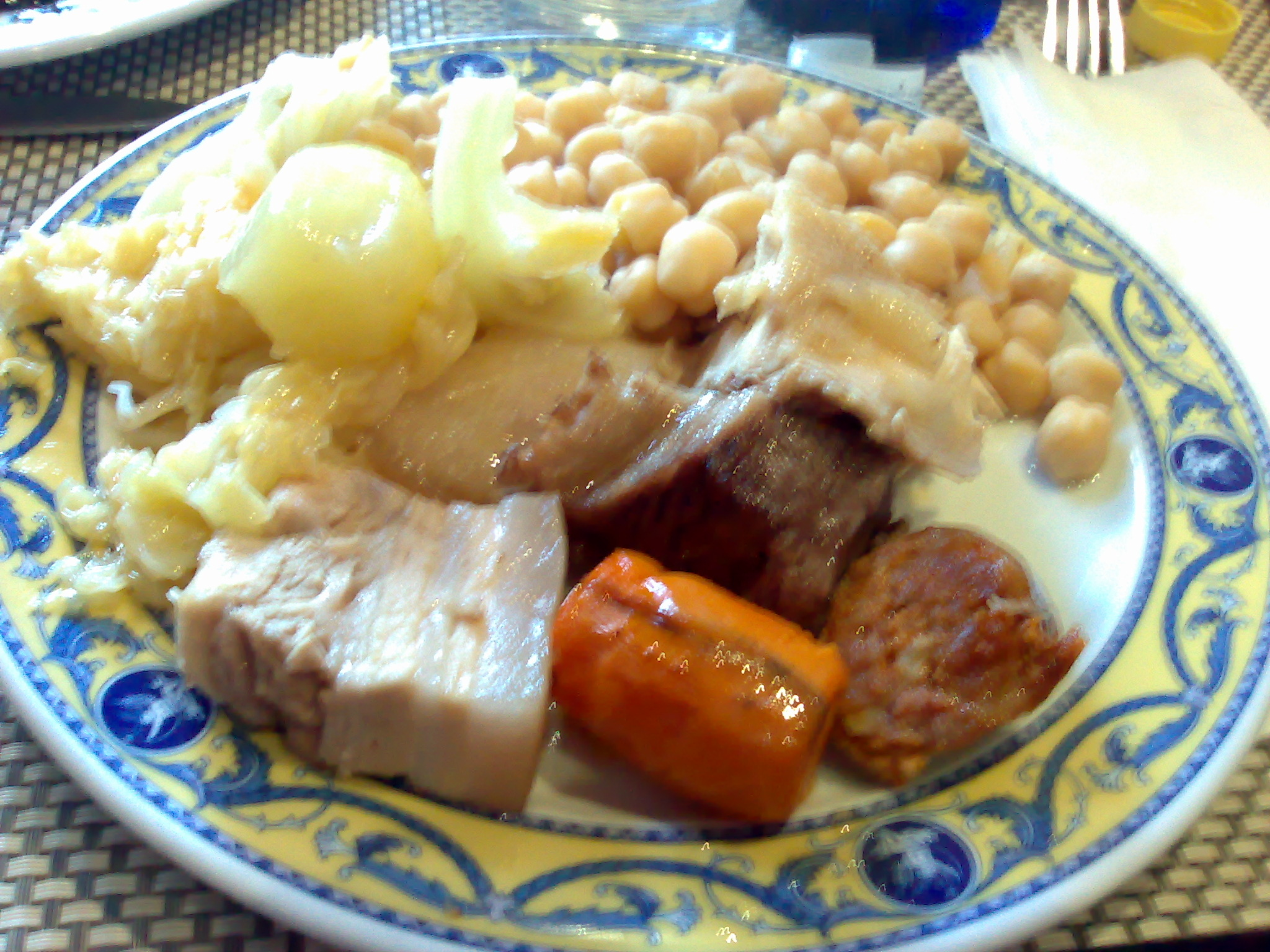
Cocido madrileño

The main ingredient of cocido is the chickpea or garbanzo. Vegetables are added: potatoes mainly, but also cabbage, carrots, and turnips. In some cases, green bean, chard or cardoon are also added.

The meat used is fundamentally pork: pork belly, usually fresh, but sometimes cured (some purists even insist to a point of rancidity); fresh (unsmoked) chorizo; onion morcilla, and dried and cured jamón serrano. Beef shank is also added; the fat content (flor) of the piece is highly prized. Chicken (especially old hens) is also part of the cocido.

Two bone pieces (ham bone and beef spine bone) are added to enrich the stock.

For some recipes, the final touch is the bola, a meatball-like mix of ground beef, bread crumbs, parsley and other spices, which, it is said, was created as a substitute of the eggs used in the adafaina.

== On the table ==
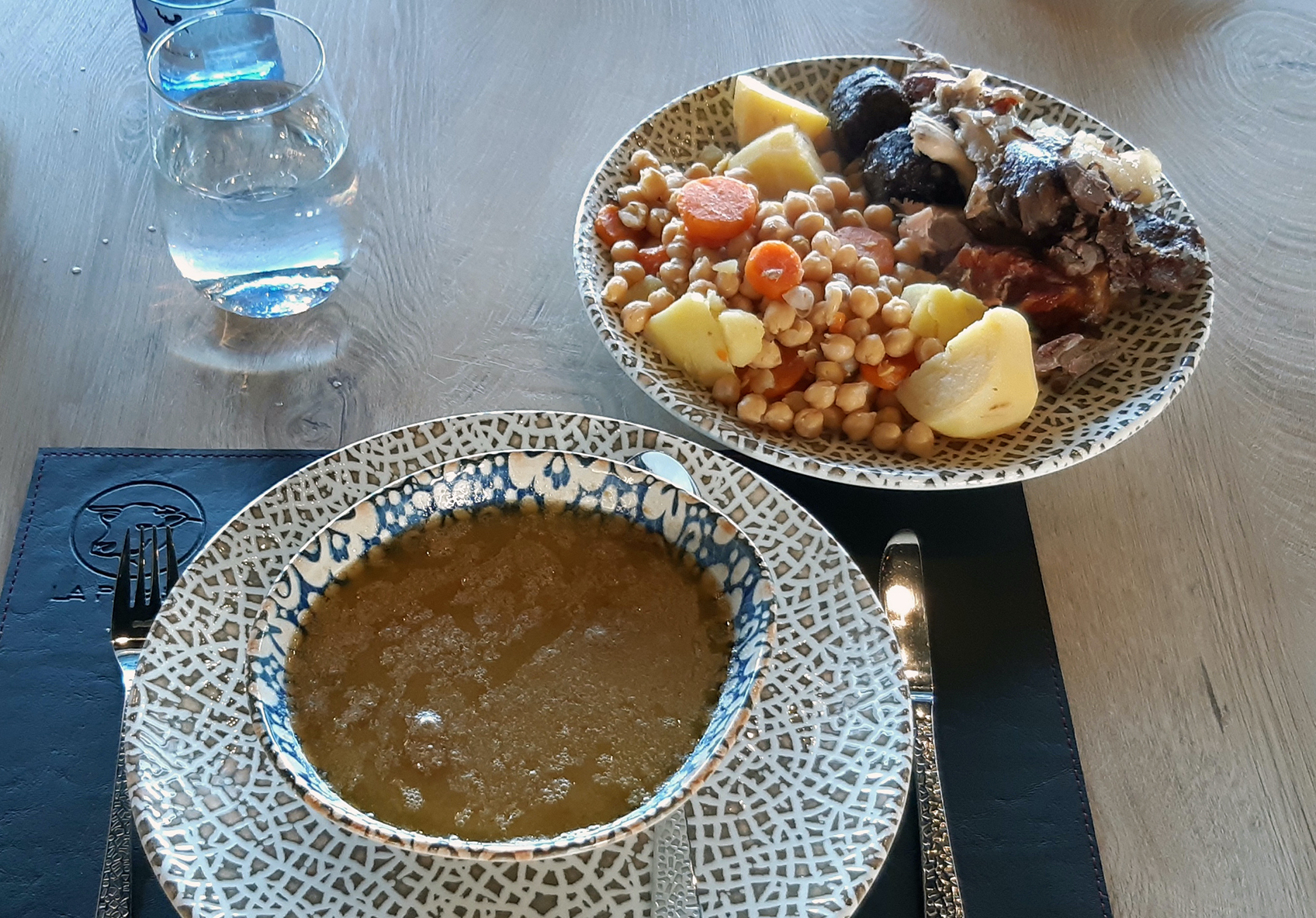

Tradition rules that the ingredients of cocido must be served separately. Each serving is known as a vuelco (tipping or emptying out), as at each time the pot must be emptied out to separate the ingredients.

The first vuelco is to separate the stock of the cocido and serve it with noodles added. The second vuelco consists of chickpeas and vegetables. The third vuelco is the meat dish.

== Leftovers ==
Traditionally, dishes made with the leftovers of the cocido include Spanish croquetas (croquettes), ropa vieja and pringá.

== See also ==
- Cocido lebaniego
- Cocido montañés
- Cozido à portuguesa
- Fabada asturiana
- List of stews
- Spanish cuisine
