= Bollito =

Bollito may refer to:

- Bollito misto, an Italian cuisine dish of "mixed" boiled meats
- Bollito de carita, a black eyed pea fritter
- Bolita, the Spanish language word for little ball and a type of lottery
- Bolito, an Italian language name for a numbers game
