= List of Bodacious Space Pirates episodes =

Bodacious Space Pirates is an anime series adapted from the Miniskirt Space Pirates light novels by Yūichi Sasamoto. The anime adaptation is produced by Satelight and directed by Tatsuo Sato. The anime follows Marika Kato, a normal high school girl in the far future who learns her recently deceased father was a space pirate captain. By law, only direct descendants can inherit her father's spaceship, the Bentenmaru, which her father's subordinates ask that she takes over as their new Captain, thus beginning Marika's adventures as a space pirate.

The anime was broadcast on Tokyo MX, MBS and TVK from January 8 to June 30, 2012, and was also simulcast by Crunchyroll. The anime has been licensed in North America by Sentai Filmworks and was released on digital outlets in February 2013, followed by DVD and Blu-ray releases. The opening theme song is "Mōretsu Uchū Kōkyōkyoku Dai Nana Gakushō «Mugen no Ai»" (猛烈宇宙交響曲・第七楽章「無限の愛」; "Bodacious Space Symphony's Movement VII «Infinite Love»") by the idol group Momoiro Clover Z and ex-Megadeth guitarist Marty Friedman. The ending theme song is "Lost Child" by Momoiro Clover Z.

== Episode list ==
No.	Title	Original release date
1	"Pirates, Coming Through"; Transliteration: "Kaizoku, Makari Tōru" (Japanese: 海賊、罷り通る)	January 8, 2012
Marika Kato is approached by two people while she is working at her job at a cafe, which they say that they are acquainted with her mother Ririka. The two later show up to her house that evening and reveal that her father Gonzaemon, captain of the spaceship Bentenmaru, recently died by food poisoning. According to her letter of marque, in order for the Bentenmaru to continue operating legally, Marika must take over as captain. As a confused Marika does some research into the matter, the Bentenmaru's helmsman and medic, Kane McDougal and Misa Grandwood transfer to Marika's school as the new teacher and school doctor respectively, along with the mysterious transfer student, Chiaki Kurihara. Later at her workplace, Marika notices groups of strange men suspiciously monitoring her. When Chiaki arrives, she exposes an impostor disguised as an airport security officer attempting to kidnap Marika and stops him by starting a gun fight in the cafe and dragging Marika to safety.
2	"My Power, The Power of a Pirate"; Transliteration: "Watashi no Chikara, Kaizoku no Chikara" (Japanese: 私の力、海賊の力)	January 15, 2012
Chiaki reveals to Marika that the men were from various organizations, sent to find out whether or not she would accept becoming captain of the Bentenmaru. As Ririka picks up her daughter, she apologizes to Marika for not revealing about Gonzaemon's involvement with the space pirates. As Ririka brings Marika to a junkyard, she teaches her daughter how to use guns, explaining about the power a pirate captain holds, whether or not Marika chooses to wield it for her own benefits. The next day, Kane becomes the adviser of the space yacht club and bring them to the space docking station where the Odette II is docked. Kane directs the space yacht club to check the ship and to get its system online. Marika and Chiaki, later alone in the Odette II, discover that a nearby docked ship is trying to hack into the spaceship system, and they begin counterattacking the hackers.
3	"The Odette II Leaves Port"; Transliteration: "Odetto Nisei, Shukkō!" (Japanese: オデット二世、出航！)	January 22, 2012
Although the security system is activated to counteract against the hackers, the massive power consumption temporarily causes the dockside breaker to trip, but it manages to force the hackers to retreat. Chiaki, later seeing Marika at the cafe, reveals that the various organizations monitoring her have agreed to leave her alone until the renewal date of her letter of marque. The space yacht club takes their exams the next day before summer vacation begins. With Kane and Misa joining them, the space yacht club begin their summer vacation traveling in the Odette II all around the Tau Ceti system. However, as they activate the ship's solar sails, the main mast gets stuck with the upper yard. Unable to fix it automatically, Kane decides to bring Marika and Chiaki, along with a few other students, to manually fix the main mast, suiting them up in spacesuits. Marika takes charge of the situation after figuring out that the angle of the upper yard must be adjusted to allow the main mast to be freed. With all of the ship masts opening their solar sails, everyone returns inside the Odette II, but not before Marika marvels the sight of seeing her home planet from space.
4	"The Final Battle is at Midnight"; Transliteration: "Kessen wa Shin'ya" (Japanese: 決戦は深夜)	January 29, 2012
Jenny Dolittle informs Kane and Misa that she has detected three spaceships without transponders following them, one of them actually being the Bentenmaru. During night duty, Marika and Chiaki conclude one of the three spaceships is trying to jam the transponder signal of the Odette II to cut off communication to the Sand of the Red Star. In order to detect this spaceship, Marika activates the high frequency radar and locates the mystery ship, revealed to be the battleship Alcyon. However, when Marika reactivates the high frequency radar, the ship mysteriously vanishes, furthermore learning that the Alcyon has been lost one hundred twenty years ago. Being informed about this so-called ghost ship, Kane makes an encrypted call to the Bentenmaru to investigate the matter, while Marika and Chiaki tries listen to his conversation from the bridge. Jenny, catching them redheaded, is already aware about Marika potentially being the captain of the Bentenmaru and possibly being targeted by the ghost ship. Marika believes that the Odette II should fight back, which the whole club agrees upon. The Odette II would be able to detect the ghost ship by maintaining its course around the Sand of the Red Star. The crew discover that the ghost ship is using a drone ship to disguise its transponder signal to avoid radar detection.
5	"Marika Makes a Decision"; Transliteration: "Marika Ketsui Suru" (Japanese: 茉莉香、決意する)	February 5, 2012
Instead of going around the Sand of the Red Star, Marika proposes that the spaceship should turn once it reaches the planet's atmosphere. Furthermore, they will let the ghost ship jam their radar and hack into a fake operating system of the Odette II, as a ruse to counteract against and take control of this enemy spaceship. As the plan goes as predicted, the club secretly identifies the ghost ship as the Lighting XI. After the Lightning XI sends a threatening message, Lynn Lambretta successfully hacks into the Lighting XI's operating system to disable its engines. After purposely shutting down its computer systems, the Lighting XI starts shooting beams at the Odette II using optical targeting. Although Chiaki prepares to have the ship accelerate away, Marika stops her, knowing that they will be spotted by the Lightning XI's infrared sensors. Instead, Marika uses the spaceship's solar sails to completely blind the Lighting XI. Two pirate spaceships, named Bentenmaru and Barbaroosa, come to help destroy the Lightning XI during this time. When Marika returns home, she tells her mother that she has made her decision to become the captain of the Bentenmaru.
6	"Marika's First Day at Work"; Transliteration: "Marika, Hatsu Shigoto Suru" (Japanese: 茉莉香、初仕事する)	February 11, 2012
Marika's vacation plans with her friend Mami get interrupted when Misa drags Marika to register and receive her letter of marque from the government. After finally getting her privateer license, she is to start her job as captain, much to her surprise. On board the Bentenmaru, the bridge crew teaches Marika various skills of a space pirate and what to expect in a real battle, with Chiaki later joining the crew for training as well. Misa explains to Marika and Chiaki that the space pirates are considered military units since the end of the War of Independence, but they are not allowed to engage in piracy in peace time. Instead, they earn money by entertaining space cruises and their guests by "boarding and robbing" them. The Bentenmaru will be "attacking" the cruise ship Princess Apricot in its first raid. Much to the entertainment of the guests, Marika announces her arrival on the deck, asking that they peacefully hand over their valuables. Kane, who went undercover earlier in the Princess Apricot as a guest, challenges Marika in a duel for the ship's fate, which Marika accepts and wins after "shooting" Kane, who gives a dramatic fake death, convincing the guests to surrender all their accessories. As a tired Marika nods to sleep after her first successful raid, Chiaki returns to the Barbaroosa without telling Marika she is returning to her old school the next semester. Despite denying it to Kane earlier, Chiaki did enjoy being with Marika.
7	"The Peace Does Not Last"; Transliteration: "Heion Mamanarazu" (Japanese: 平穏ままならず)	February 18, 2012
Marika is having a hard time juggling between being a student and a space pirate, much to Kane and Misa's worry. Chiaki visits the cafe, only to learn from Mami that Marika was called for an unscheduled job. In Mami's opinion, Marika seems to always push herself to the limit for seeing Ririka as her role model. As Chiaki finishes her shopping, her father tells her something important, which makes her decide to stay at the Sea of the Morning Star for now. At the Bentenmaru, Marika is inform that their new job is to "rob" the mega ship Symphony Angel, which is accompanied by three escort ships. They are also inform that their client wants the Bentenmaru to have a space battle with the escort ships to entertain the passengers of the Symphony Angel. While Marika commands the ship as usual, she is also informed by Misa to take the battle seriously even if it is for show. After several volleys against each other, the Symphony Angel and its escorts surrender, allowing Marika to board and "rob" the ship. As Marika tries to get her rest, she is dragged back to the bridge and is told that a stowaway temporarily overwrote their security system and sneaked into their ship. Marika realizes that this stowaway, who refuses to negotiate with anyone other than the captain, is a child.
8	"The Princess and The Pirate"; Transliteration: "Hime to Kaizoku" (Japanese: 姫と海賊)	February 25, 2012
The stowaway reveals herself as Gruier Serenity, the seventh princess of her royal family, and is shocked to find out that Marika is the new captain of this spaceship. After introducing Gruier to the crew of the Bentenmaru, Gruier requests Marika to help her find a golden ghost ship. While Gruier claims that her officials are aware where she is, a recent official news report says Gruier is reported missing, much to everyone's suspicions. Suspecting a plot, Gruier becomes a transfer student at Hakuoh, using her popularity to prevent anyone from kidnapping her. Misa does some investigation upon the matter. When Marika is called for an emergency job with Gruier tagging along, the Bentenmaru learns six ships from the royal defense force are heading toward their star system, but all of them are in battle mode and five of them are chasing a damaged scout ship. Gruier believes the scout ship has the item she requested and the other ships are trying to prevent it from delivering it to her. Now knowing what to do, the Bentenmaru prepares to meet the royal ships.
9	"A Beautiful Launch"; Transliteration: "Kareinaru Funade" (Japanese: 華麗なる船出)	March 3, 2012
Marika helps Gruier order all of the royal ships to cease all hostilities, while the Bentenmaru boards the damaged ship. Marika and Gruier greet Yotof Sif Sideux and Catherine, who deliver a package for the princess, a data storage device containing information on the location of the golden ghost ship. Marika, surprised to see Chiaki at school in the space yacht club room, is told that the Barbaroosa has been tasked by a client to not only find the golden ghost ship but destroy any ships pursuing it as well. Jenny plans for another space cruise school trip on the Odette II, which will discreetly allow Marika and Gruier to return to the Bentenmaru, so that their school attendances will not be affected. Later that night, Marika and Ririka heads to a private restaurant, where they meet up with the Bentenmaru crew. Hyakume explains the golden ghost ship is in fact one of the first generation colony transport ships before FTL travel was perfected. The data storage device shows the pattern the golden ghost ship has been traveling in the galaxy. Now knowing where they can find the ship and the dangers they face, Marika orders the Bentenmaru to set sail by FTL.
10	"Battle in the Storm"; Transliteration: "Arashi no Hōgekisen" (Japanese: 嵐の砲撃戦)	March 10, 2012
The Barbaroosa substitutes for the Bentenmaru to entertain guests on a cruise ship. Meanwhile, the Bentenmaru travels into a space storm all night for the search of the ghost ship. The next morning, Coorie hacks into the buoy arrays sent out by seventeen royal family search parties, which she learns were launched fifteen years ago, two years before Gruier was born. When one of the buoys detect the ghost ship, Marika orders the Bentamaru to jump six light-years away into hyperspace to that location and prepare for battle. However, the ghost jumps into subspace, leaving the Bentenmaru surrounded by the Serenity Fleet. The Bentenmaru then launches decoys to confuses the fleet and does a crippling hit and run on two royal escort ships heading their way. Although Gruier wants to contact the Serenity Fleet, Marika advises her not to do the agreements they made with Chiaki and Jenny in the first place. The objective now is to find the golden ghost ship before the Serenity Fleet beats them to it.
11	"Wanderer of Light"; Transliteration: "Senkō no Wandarā" (Japanese: 閃光の彷徨者)	March 17, 2012
The Serenity Fleet is led by its flagship known as the Queen Serendipity. It is shown that this fleet is using a prism formation as a means to easily catch the ghost ship. Marika announces that the ship will travel by FTL to the location. This sends the Bentenmaru through a spatial rift, and, with much concentration, Kane manages to sail the ship out to safety. The golden ghost ship, coming out of subspace, happens to be the cause of the spatial rift. As the Queen Serendipity has also arrived, Grunhilde Serenity, captain of this spaceship and Gruier's younger sister, contacts the Bentenmaru to request Gruier to leave the Bentenmaru or there will be hostilities which the latter refuses. The golden ghost ship reveals itself as the Queen Serendipity, and the Bentenmaru successful docks after it recognizes Gruier via its computer scan, and it momentarily prepares itself to travel into subspace once again.
12	"A Return from Eternity"; Transliteration: "Towa yori no Kikan" (Japanese: 永遠よりの帰還)	March 24, 2012
Marika brings along Misa, Hyakume, and Schnitzer to escort Gruier inside the ghost ship. After passing by various sections of the ship, the entourage arrives at the Artificial Womb, where it is said that all members of the Serenity royal family were genetically made and born here since the first king. Gruier truly wants to destroy the Artificial Womb since she believes the time of the royal family has ended and the kingdom should be governed by its people. However, Grunhilde and her soldiers arrive, and she states that the Artificial Womb should remain to create a new heir in hopes of bringing glory back to the royal family. As the pirates and soldiers begin to face off, Marika throws a smoke grenade and gasses both Gruier and Grunhilde to sleep. Gruier wakes up to find out that the pirates and soldiers made an alliance. The mission to destroy the Artificial Womb was pointless since it was no longer functional. Additionally, if she had destroyed it, Gruier would have killed the last princess of the royal family to be born from it. With both Gruier and Grunhilde making peace, they return the golden ghost ship to the Serenity Kingdom Star System and the Bentenmaru returns home.
13	"Marika Sends an Invitation"; Transliteration: "Marika, Shōtai Suru" (Japanese: 茉莉香、招待する)	March 31, 2012
As Marika makes her way home, Gruier calls her back to award her a medal, which gains Marika a lot of fame back home. As Marika starts her second year of school, she finds that Gruier's stay at the space yacht club has been extended and Grunhilde has also enrolled at her school and the club. Later that day, Gruier visits Marika to give her proper thanks, giving her an ID ring used by Marika's father which Gruier had used to sneak aboard the Bentenmaru. After a successful day of recruiting new yacht club members, Marika invites Gruier and Grunhilde to her house for dinner. As the Bentenmaru takes on a job transporting illegal materials, including a group of experimental monkeys, Marika gets the idea to take Gruier and Grunhilde to the zoo.
14	"Marika Goes Recruiting"; Transliteration: "Marika, Boshū suru" (Japanese: 茉莉香、募集する)	April 7, 2012
As Marika is given a break from her captaining duties, the entire crew gets infected with a disease carried by the monkeys they were transporting, putting them in isolation for two weeks. As such, Marika is asked to contact Show, head of the Harry Lloyd Insurance Union, who tells her the crew is likely to be out of action for a month. As Marika deduces she needs to recruit a temporary crew to prevent Bentenmaru's pirating license from being revoked due to lack of activity, Gruier accompanies her to a relay station to search for candidates. While there, they end up encountering Chiaki and her father, Kenjo Kurihara, captain of the Barbaroosa. Kenjo reminds Marika that although skill, personality, and strength are good qualities for finding a crew, the most important thing to look for is to be able to trust in them. As such, Marika ends up recruiting the space yacht club.
15	"Smuggling, Leaving Port and a Leap"; Transliteration: "Mikkō Shukkō Daichōyaku" (Japanese: 密航出航大跳躍)	April 14, 2012
Launching from the Odette II, Lynn uses her hacking skills to fool space traffic control and sets the Odette II on an autopilot course where Marika and space yacht club will leave the ship and board the Bentenmaru. Upon learning Marika and the space yacht club will crew their ship, the Bentenmaru crew quickly makes an instruction manual for the club and secretly use Show as their middleman before the club makes any serious mistakes. Unfortunately, the crew forgets to put instructions on how to perform an FTL jump, and what is worse is that military scout ships are heading towards the Bentenmaru, due to one of the club members accidentally firing the laser cannons earlier. Using her past knowledge of previous FTL jumps done on the ship, Marika manages to instruct the club to successfully perform a FTL jump. As the club celebrates, Chiaki, Gruier, and Grunhilde realizes the Bentenmaru crew were spying and helping them, but decides to keep it a secret in order to not hurt Marika's pride.
16	"The Hakuoh Pirates' First Job"; Transliteration: "Hatsu Shigoto! Hakuō Kaizoku-dan" (Japanese: 初仕事!白凰海賊団)	April 21, 2012
As the girls rest for the night, Grunhilde stumbles upon Lynn secretly communicating with someone. The next day, Marika and the space yacht club begins their first pirate raid on the Princess Apricot. However, because the Princess Apricot is the Bentenmaru's regular customer and the space yacht club are wearing cosplay outfits made by Mami, the passengers get suspicious but eventually warm up to the girls. Later that night, Marika becomes unsettled of Lynn after Grunhilde tells her about the club president's secretive behaviour. Wishing to find the truth, the girls confront Lynn upon the matter. For an answer, Lynn presents a job for the Bentenmaru which entails capturing Jenny, their former space yacht club president.
17	"A Surprising Client"; Transliteration: "Igai naru Irainin" (Japanese: 意外なる依頼人)	April 28, 2012
Lynn reveals the job offer was from Jenny herself, who wants Marika to help her escape from the cruise liner Ultimate Fairy, since her uncle, Robert Dolittle, the current head of Hugh and Dolittle Interstellar Transportation, is marrying her off to prevent her from inheriting the company. Jenny manages to escape using the Silent Whisper, an advanced military scout ship, and docks into the Bentenmaru, and she and Lynn are revealed to be lovers. Meanwhile, Robert has learned of his niece's disappearance and pressures Show into demanding that Jenny be surrendered. When Show contacts the Bentenmaru, Jenny tells him that she hired Marika to escort her to Space University, a neutral territory to avoid being chased by her uncle, and as payment for the job Jenny will provide ten percent of her profits of the travel corporation she has founded herself, convincing Show not to give in to Robert. With their insurance company backing them, the Bentenmaru set course to Space University while escaping the Dolittle space fleet.
18	"We'll Have Juice at the After Party"; Transliteration: "Uchiage wa Jūsu" (Japanese: 打ち上げはジュース)	May 5, 2012
As the Bentenmaru is being pursued, Grunhilde suggests that they confront Jenny's fiancee, Junigh Coolph, to try to get the wedding cancelled. The Bentenmaru crew manage to dig up some dirt on Robert, which they deliver to Marika via Show. Marika and the space yacht club board the Glorious Coolph to find him leading an anti-government rebellion, which is soon put to a stop thanks to Chiaki's intervention and Jenny's live broadcast on air. As Robert confronts the club, they bring to light his crimes of selling military weapons to anti-government forces, bringing the case to a close. As the girls celebrate their victory, Jenny goes onto Space University while the Bentenmaru crew are cleared of their quarantine. Marika is given the Silent Whisper by Jenny, and she later thanks Misa and the crew for secretly helping her.
19	"The Bonds Among the Four"; Transliteration: "Yonin no Kizuna" (Japanese: 四人の絆)	May 12, 2012
The space yacht club heads up to the relay station to do some spring cleaning on the Odette II. Marika, who is a little sleep-deprived from exams, decides to give the Bentenmaru a bit of a cleanup too. During the second day of cleaning, Marika unknowingly loses the ID ring she got from Gruier on the Odette II, which she only realizes this when the Bentenmaru crew are finally discharged and find themselves locked out of the bridge. Thankfully, Grunhilde manages to find it and, with help from the space yacht club, manages to get the Bentenmaru up and running again. While the girls sort through some of the stored items, San-Daime seems very fond of collecting some of the teddy bears he found. As Marika retreats to the captain's room after all the cleaning is done, she starts to learn how to make her mother's pot-au-feu.
20	"The Captain Rides the Waves"; Transliteration: "Senchō, Nami ni Noru" (Japanese: 茉莉香、波に乗る)	May 19, 2012
Having previously found some space dinghies aboard the Odette II, the space yacht club decide to enter the Nineteenth Nebula Cup Dinghy Championship in two weeks, although they soon discover only one of the members, Ai Hoshimiya, has any experience piloting one. Kane decides to be their adviser again to train the girls to pilot dinghies. The girls learn their academy was suspended for five years after the thirteenth championship race due to a great pileup that was caused by them. Fearing that this might be repeated, the championship committee asks Show to assign the Bentenmaru as security. The organizations that are still monitoring Marika learn that the criminal Bisque Company are targeting her. The next day, Kane holds a windsurfing contest where the top three to finish the race will be going to the championship. During the second part of the contest, Kane has the Bentenmaru fire one of their beams near the beach in order to cause a giant wave. Natalia, Grunhilde and Ai end up qualifying to represent the club for the upcoming championship race.
21	"The Final Battle at the Nebula Cup"; Transliteration: "Kessen! Nebyura Kappu" (Japanese: 決戦! ネビュラカップ)	May 26, 2012
The space yacht club arrives at the planet Calmwind, where the competition will be held. However, the club gets an odd reception from the spectators around them, due to the five-year suspension they received after Lynn (as instructed by her club senpais) had redirected the thirteenth championship race to an extremely hazardous route. Marika borrows a space dinghy from the committee to keep a close eye on the race, but the paranoid committee chairwoman chases after Marika upon learning her association with Hakuoh Academy. The race begins as normal, with the contestants entering the Calmwind atmosphere, when a solar flare erupts. During the race, a Bisque Company gunship starts shooting at the racers to try and find Marika, who orders Chiaki to lead everyone to safety while she distract the gunship. The Bentenmaru then arrives to pick up Marika as they chase the gunship. Unable to use any of their weapons except their main beam cannon, Ai helps the Bentenmaru using the planet's wind direction to take down the gunship. With her radar fried by the gunship's EMP blast, Ai continues the race using the planet's constellation. In the end, the criminals are arrested and Chiaki wins the championship race, with Grunhilde in second place.
22	"Pirate Hunting"; Transliteration: "Kaizoki Gari" (Japanese: 海賊狩り)	June 2, 2012
Marika learns about a mysterious ship has been hunting down the space pirates recently. Despite the threat they face by the "pirate hunters", Marika tells her crew they will still do one more job to renew their privateer license before her exams. At the same time, the space yacht club prepares a final practice cruise for Lynn and the third-years, who are due to graduate and leave Marika as the next club president. Thanks to Show, the Bentenmaru is assigned to escort the pirate ship Big Catch and its fleet. Soon, the space pirates are attacked by the pirate hunters, who easily destroy the fleet using their superior weaponry and incredible maneuverability. As Marika orders the Bentenmaru to escape, another mysterious ship appears.
23	"Head for the Pirate's Nest!"; Transliteration: "Mezase! Kaizoku no Su" (Japanese: 目指せ!海賊の巣)	June 9, 2012
The Parabellum, a privateer pirate ship under the Galactic Empire, is piloted by the mysterious Ironbeard, who drives off the enemy ship, the Grand Cross. After Ironbeard warns Marika that space pirates will be wiped out if nothing is done before retreating, the Bentenmaru manages to get everyone off the Big Catch before it explodes. Later, Chiaki informs Marika and Gruier that Kenjo wants to call all of the space pirates who fought during the War of Independence to reform the pirate council and unite against the pirate hunters. The Grand Cross is revealed to be one of four new prototype ships with gravity control technology made for the Imperial fleet, and the Empire might be involved due to the Parabellum. To do this, they need to find the legendary chef, one who served and united the pirates during the war and the only who has the song to call them. Going to the private restaurant, Marika suspects Oyaji to be that person, but it turns out that he is the son of the legendary chef, and that his older brother took the title instead. Nonetheless, he plays the rally song of the pirates to all of the space pirates old communication units to gather at the Pirate's Nest. As the Bentenmaru makes its way, they are confronted by the Grand Cross.
24	"The Wounded Benten"; Transliteration: "Kizudarake no Benten" (Japanese: 傷だらけの弁天)	June 16, 2012
As the Grand Cross attacks, Marika manages to use her quick thinking to get the Bentenmaru to safety before it takes too much damage. As they arrive at the Pirate's Nest, an asteroid space station, to make repairs and upgrades on their ship, Marika and Chiaki meets with Kenjo, who informs them all of the space pirates will arrive here in three days despite attacks by the Grand Cross. Marika later encounters Quartz Christie, captain of the Grand Cross, who reveals she is attacking the pirates for battle data for her ship and for recognizing their lack of piracy. Meanwhile, Misa and Kane figure out that Luca is actually an impostor android spy for the Grand Cross, while a man who looks like Kane secretly watches. Marika talks with her mother on the phone, unaware that Ririka is with Ironbeard on the Parabellum and heading towards the Pirate's Nest.
25	"The Pirate's Council Begins"; Transliteration: "Kaisai! Kaizoku Kaigi" (Japanese: 開催! 海賊会議)	June 23, 2012
Luca comes back, revealing to the crew she got lost vacationing when the impostor android took over, while hiding the fact that Ririka helped her. The space pirates, gathering at the main dining hall, are startled upon Quartz's appearance, but the head chef allows her here because she is a pirate endorsed by the Galactic Empire. To settle things, Marika challenges Quartz to a duel where the space pirates will battle against her forces, to which the latter agrees. Before a hotheaded captain starts causing trouble, Ironbeard, who is under orders from the Empress of the Empire to retrieve Quartz, intervenes. Come dinnertime, Ironbeard and Quartz are soon confronted by the hotheaded captain, only to be subdued by Ririka. Misa arrives, learning that Kane had switched places with his twin brother, Shane McDougal, helmsman of the Parabellum crew. Ironbeard wishes to know if the space pirates in this region will either become true pirates or privateers. With the Bentenmaru repaired and upgraded, Marika is chosen to become the leader of the entire forces of the space pirates and is to lead them to their duel with the Grand Cross.
26	"There Go the Pirates"; Transliteration: "Soshite, Kaizoku wa Iku" (Japanese: そして、海賊は行く)	June 30, 2012
Arriving at the dueling area where they found the golden ghost ship, Marika and the space pirate fleet find themselves up against three Grand Cross ships. Thanks to Coorie's hacking skills, they manage to trick the Grand Cross ships into a chaff field and destroy two of them with missiles. With Quartz distracted, Marika leads a boarding party by ramming into Quartz's ship with the pirate ship Shangri-la. As the pirates fight the Grand Cross security drones, Marika comes face to face with Quartz. Continuing their talk about the space pirates in her region, Marika gives a speech to Quartz why they still have a right to exist. An impressed Quartz escapes with her combat data from the Grand Cross after detonating it, but not before telling Marika they should meet again in vaster seas. As the pirate fleet celebrate their victory, the Parabellum picks up the space yacht club from the Odette II, where Gruier meets up with Ironbeard, who is revealed to be Gonzaemon. With their battle over, Marika heads home to the Sea of the Morning Star and passes her exams, while Chiaki decides to stay at Hakuoh Academy indefinitely.
