= Bolito =

Bolito may refer to:

- Bolita, the Spanish-language word for little ball and a type of lottery
- Bollito misto, an Italian cuisine dish of mixed boiled meats
- Bollito de carita, a black eyed pea fritter
- "Bolito", a fictional decapitation device in the 2013 Ridley Scott film The Counselor
- "Bolito", a competitive Apex Legends player
