= Oleo =

Oleo is a term for oils. It is commonly used to refer to a variety of things:

- Colloquial term for margarine, a.k.a. oleomargarine
- Oleic acid
- Oleo strut, a type of shock absorbers on aircraft landing gear
- "Oleo" (composition), a musical composition by Sonny Rollins
  - Oleo (Grant Green album), a 1962 album featuring the above composition
  - Oleo (Lee Konitz album), a 1975 album featuring the above composition
  - Oleo (Joe McPhee album), a 1983 album featuring the above composition
  - Oleo (New York Unit album), a 1989 album featuring the above composition
- Óleo, a city in the São Paulo state in Brazil
- GNU Oleo, a (defunct) spreadsheet program
- Oleo drop, a kind of theater curtain

== See also ==
- Olio (disambiguation)
