= Fabes con almejas =

Stew originating in northwest Spain

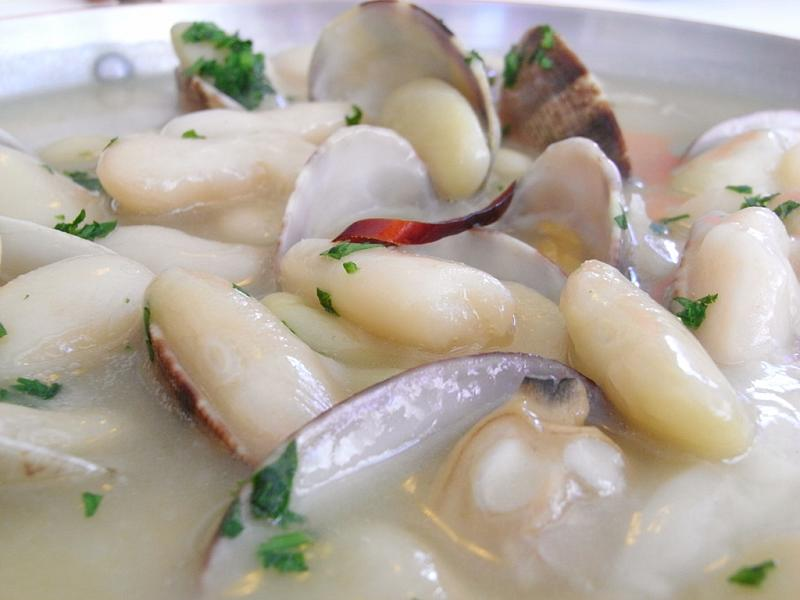
- A close up of fabes con almejas
- Alternative names: Habas con almejas (Spanish); Fabes con amasueles (Asturian)
- Course: Main course or appetizer
- Place of origin: Asturias
- Region or state: Asturias
- Serving temperature: Hot
- Main ingredients: Clams, beans
- Variations: Fabada Asturiana
- Other information: Popular throughout Asturias

Fabes con almejas (English: Beans with clams, Spanish: Habas con almejas, Asturian: Fabes con amasueles) is a clam and bean stew that originated in the principality of Asturias in the 19th century as peasant fare. It is a lighter variation of Asturian fabada whose primary ingredients are sausage, beans and pork.

The traditional recipe for fabes con almejas calls for small clams, fava beans, onions, garlic, salt, saffron, bay leaves, olive oil, parsley, bread crumbs and sometimes sweet paprika.

== See also ==
- List of clam dishes
- List of fish and seafood soups
- List of seafood dishes
