= Olio =

Olio may refer to:

== Arts and entertainment ==
- Olio (musical number), a short dance or song performed as an encore to a theatrical play
- Olio drop, a kind of theater curtain
- Olio (Mina album), 1999
- Olio (Thad Jones album), 1957
- The Olio, a book of essays, poetry and other short pieces by Francis Grose, first published in 1792
- Olio (poetry collection), a 2016 book of poetry by Tyehimba Jess
- "Olio", a song by the Rapture on their albums Echoes and Mirror

== Food ==
- Olio (app), a food-sharing service
- Olio is an English name for the Spanish stew also known as Olla podrida
- olio, meaning oil in Italian and also an old term for an English oil-based dressing for food

== Other uses ==
- Olio Township, Woodford County, Illinois, USA
- Olio Model One, a smartwatch produced from 2015-2016 by now defunct Olio Devices, Inc.

== See also ==
- Oleo (disambiguation)
