= Biba Caggiano =

Italian-American chef (1936–2019)

- Born: Biba Bertacchini; October 18, 1936; Bologna, Italy
- Died: August 29, 2019 (aged 82)
- Education: University of Bologna
- Culinary career
- Cooking style: Italian

Biba Caggiano (October 18, 1936 – August 29, 2019) was an Italian-American cookbook author, television chef, and restaurateur.

== Biography ==
Caggiano was born in Bologna. Her first exposure to professional cooking was through her mother, who owned and operated a trattoria in Bologna. She married a New Yorker named Vincent. She grew up cooking the food of her native Emilia-Romagna region. In 1960, she moved to New York, the hometown of her husband. In 1969, the family moved to Sacramento, which at the time did not have an Italian restaurant of note. In 1986, she opened her own restaurant, Biba, which went on to become one of the most famous Italian restaurants in California.

Both Caggiano and her restaurant won many prestigious awards. Caggiano's cooking show, Biba's Italian Kitchen, aired on TLC and Discovery Channel and lasted for over 100 episodes.

She was a cancer survivor. Caggiano died on August 29, 2019, at the age of 82, after a two-year battle with Alzheimer and Parkinson's disease.

== Books ==
As an author, Caggiano penned eight widely selling cookbooks, which together have reportedly sold more than 600,000 copies. These include the following:

- Trattoria Cooking
- Biba's Taste of Italy
- From Biba's Italian kitchen
- Italy al dente
- Biba's Italy
- Northern Italian Cooking
- Spaghetti Sauces
