= Cocido lebaniego =

Traditional dish from Cantabria containing chickpeas

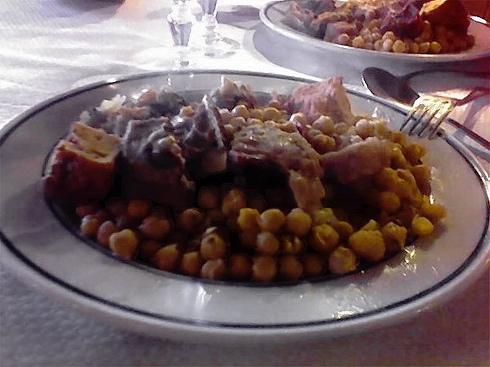
- Alternative names: Cocíu lebaniegu
- Type: Stew
- Course: Appetiser or main course
- Place of origin: Spain
- Region or state: Cantabria
- Serving temperature: Hot
- Main ingredients: Chickpeas, potatoes, collard greens or cabbage, pork, beef

Cocido lebaniego is a traditional dish from the region of Liébana in Cantabria, Spain. This stew has some essential ingredients, which include chickpea from the municipality of Potes, potatoes, and collard greens (nowadays cabbage is sometimes substituted for the collard greens). The rest of the elements of this recipe are known as compangu, which refers to meat from the pig slaughter, such as bacon (tocino), black pudding (morcilla), chorizo, and ham. Another additional ingredient is beef, especially cecina, bones and a stuffing made of bread flour, eggs, chorizo, and parsley.

== Characteristics ==
This dish is very rich and has great nutritional value. Therefore, it is eaten as a main dish. The soup is eaten first, then the chickpeas (occasionally with lettuce) and finally the meat with the stuffing, although sometimes the chickpeas and meat are served together.

== See also ==
- List of stews
- Cocido madrileño
- Cocido montañés
- Cozido à portuguesa
