= Fabes de la Granja =

Fabes la granxa (Asturian, beans of La Granja, a town in Spain) are a type of white runner bean cultivated in the autonomous community of Asturias. It is primarily used as an ingredient of fabada asturiana.

For beans (legumes) to qualify as Fabes la granja they must have the following characteristics:

- no stained, broken, empty, or wrinkled grains
- humidity: 14-18%
- size: big and uniform
- length: 21–26 mm
- width: 9–11 mm
- thickness: 7–8 mm
- form: preferably kidney shape
- colour and shade: sparky white.

This variety has a high fat content, which makes it especially smooth and greasy.

== See also ==
- Common bean (Phaseolus vulgaris)
- Phaseolus species
