= Cozido à portuguesa =

Traditional Portuguese boiled meal

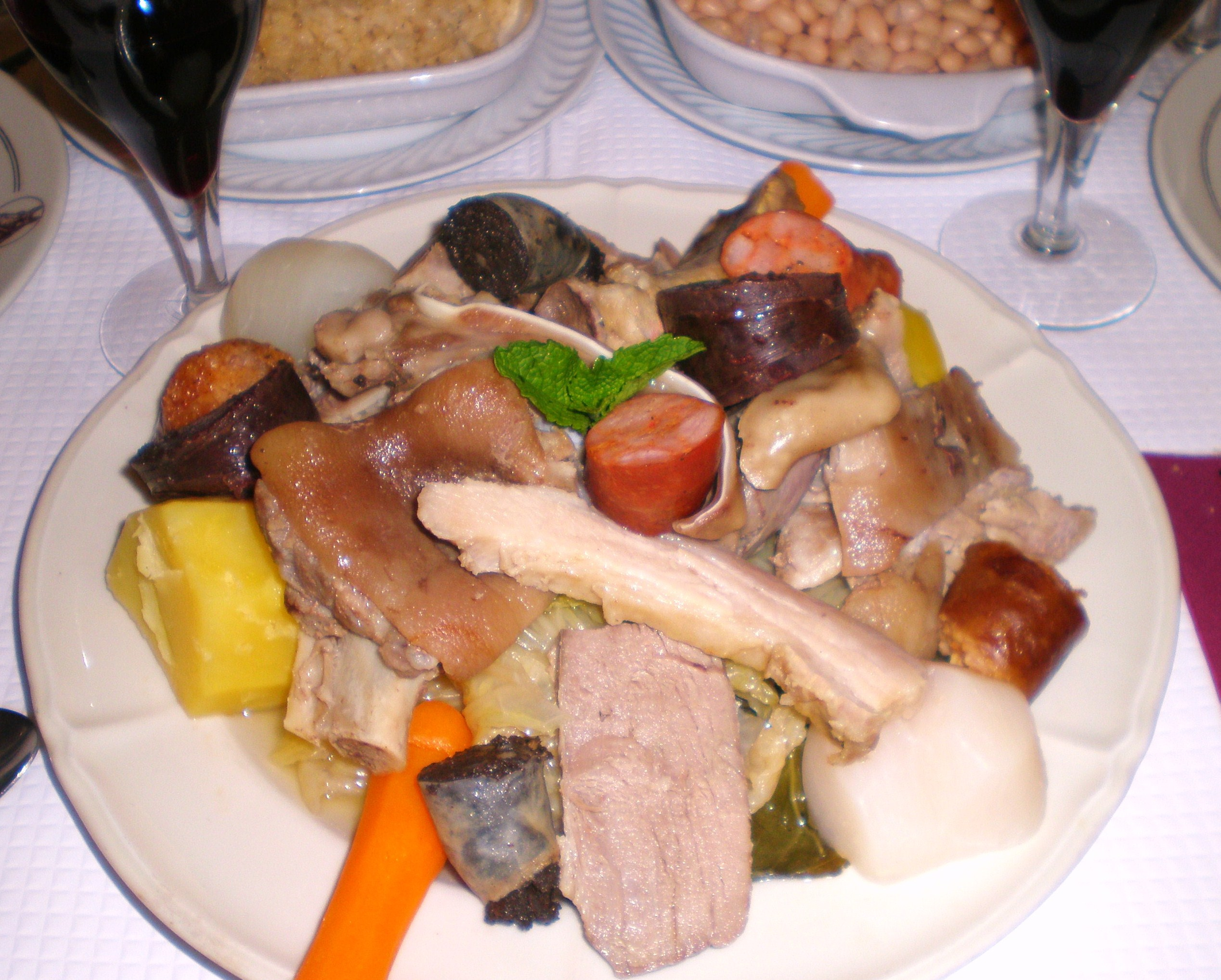
- Cozido à portuguesa (Portuguese boil) plate
- Type: Cozido
- Place of origin: Portugal
- Associated cuisine: Portuguese cuisine
- Cooking time: 4 hours
- Main ingredients: Vegetables, meats, Portuguese smoked sausages
- Food energy (per 1 serving): 1,178 kcal (4,930 kJ)
Nutritional value
(per 1 serving)
- Protein: 67 g
- Fat: 55 g
- Carbohydrate: g

Cozido à portuguesa (pronounced [kuˈziðu a puɾtuˈɣezɐ]) or Portuguese stew is a type of cozido, traditional Portuguese boiled meal. Numerous regional variations exist throughout Portugal, and the dish is considered part of the Portuguese heritage, as well as one of the national dishes of Portugal.

== Preparation and ingredients ==
Cozido à Portuguesa is prepared with a multitude of vegetables (cabbages, beans, potatoes, carrots, turnips, rice), meat (chicken, pork ribs, bacon, pork ear and trotters, various parts of beef), and smoked sausages (chouriço, farinheira, morcela), among others. In the São Miguel Island, Azores, a local version of the Cozido à Portuguesa is cooked underground with heat and steam coming from the volcanic phenomena in the area.

== See also ==
- Bosnian pot – Bosnian stew
- Cocido lebaniego – Traditional dish from Cantabria containing chickpeas
- Cocido montañés – Spanish bean stew
- Irish stew – Irish meat and vegetable stew
- Pot-au-feu – French beef stew
- Jota, also known as Istrian stew – Stew from the northern Adriatic regions
- List of stews
