= Bollito misto =

Italian stew

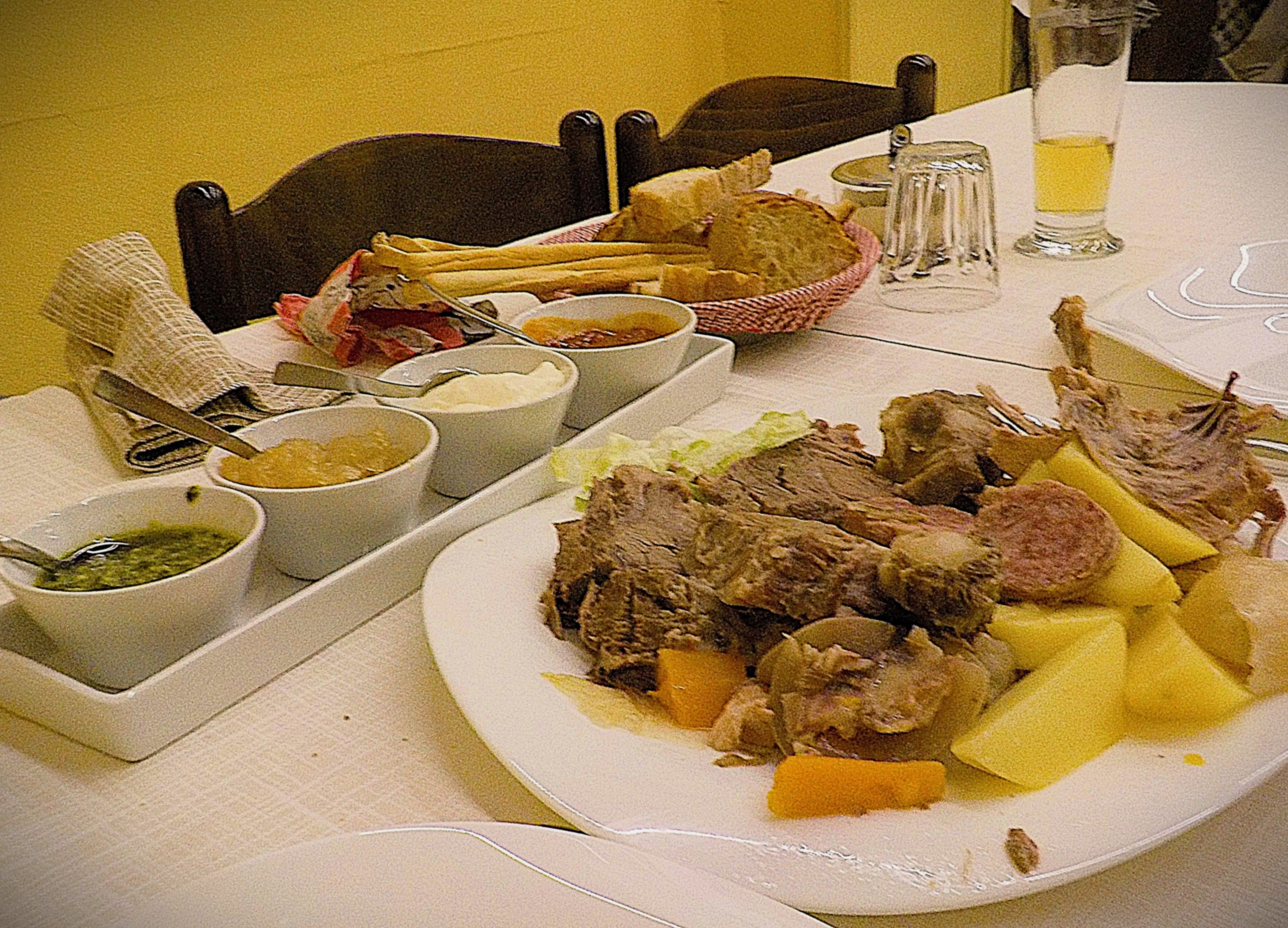
- Bollito misto served with salsa verde, mostarda, potatoes, and grissini
- Type: Stew
- Course: Secondo (Italian course)
- Place of origin: Italy
- Main ingredients: Beef and veal, cotechino, whole hen or capon

Bollito misto (Italian: [bolˈliːto ˈmisto]; lit. 'mixed boil' or 'mixed boiled meat') is an Italian stew consisting of various tougher cuts of beef and veal, cotechino, and a whole hen or capon, all simmered in an aromatic vegetable stock. It resembles the French pot-au-feu.

Bollito misto and its many regional variations are eaten throughout Italy; it is popular in Emilia-Romagna, Piedmont, and Lombardy. The meat is sliced thinly and served with mostarda and salsa verde.

== History and description ==
One-pot stews have long been common to many cuisines. Those using a mixture of meats include the French pot-au-feu, the Belgian hochepot, the German Pichelsteiner, the Spanish cocido and the South American puchero. Bollito misto is a comparable dish from Italy.

Anna Del Conte writes in her 2001 Gastronomy of Italy that the mixture of meats in a bollito misto varies by locality. In Piedmont and Lombardy beef is the main ingredient, and in Emilia-Romagna pork products—cotechino and zampone—take first place. Del Conte stipulates, "A classic bollito misto should include beef, veal, chicken, tongue, a cotechino and half a calf's head". The meats are added to the pot at different times, depending on how long they take to cook. Chefs and food writers from Italy and elsewhere prescribe widely differing ingredients:

Cook/writer	Beef	Veal	Poultry	Sausage	Ref
James Beard	Brisket	Tongue	Capon	Cotechino	
Biba Caggiano	Brisket; tongue (optional)	Rump; calf's head (optional)	Chicken or capon	Cotechino	
Antonio Carluccio	Brisket	Cheek and tongue	Boiling chicken	Cotechino	
Elizabeth David	Silverside	Fillet; calf's head and feet	Capon or turkey	Cotechino	(Note: David writes that a piece of gammon and a pig's head could be added to the meats.)
Hugh Fearnley-Whittingstall	Brisket or shin; tongue	–	Boiling hen	Cotechino	
Rose Gray and Ruth Rogers	Tongue	Silverside (optional)	Capon or boiling fowl	Cotechino or zampone de Modena	
Sophie Grigson	Brisket, flank or shin	Tongue; shoulder or brisket	Chicken	Cotechino and/or zampone	(Note: Grigson mentions pork as an additional meat.)
Marcella Hazan	Brisket or rump; tongue	Brisket or rump; half a calf's head	Chicken	Cotechino	
Alastair Little	Shank; tongue	Shank; foot	Capon or chicken	Cotechino or zampone	
Anton Mosimann	Tongue; brisket, rump or chuck	Shoulder; foot (or pig's trotter)	Chicken	Cotechino	
Claudia Roden	Brisket; tongue	Rump or shoulder; foot (or pig's trotter)	Chicken	Cotechino	
Jody Scaravella	Chuck	Shoulder	Capon or turkey (optional)	Cotechino	(Note: Scaravella also includes pork shoulder in his ingredients.)
John Torode	Salt beef; tongue	Shank	Chicken	Cotechino	
Alice Waters	Brisket; tongue	–	Chicken legs	Fennel sausages	

According to Larousse Gastronomique, the meat is cooked in stock with onions, carrots and celery and served with vegetables such as carrots, turnips and celeriac cooked in a little of the strained stock. Depending on the region, bollito misto is accompanied by different sauces. The two most frequently served are salsa verde and bagnet ross or salsa rossa (a tomato sauce). According to Del Conte, the best-known bollito misto, the Piedmontese gran bui, is served with at least three sauces, with saussa d’avie (made with honey, walnuts and mustard) in addition to salsa verde and salsa rossa. In the Veneto, bollito misto is accompanied by peverada, (Note: A traditional Venetian sauce made from the liver of guinea fowl or chicken, with anchovies and soppressata sausage.) and in Lombardy mostarda di Cremona is served along with salsa verde.

Restaurants that offer bollito misto often serve it from special trolleys with each of the various meats in its separate compartment full of hot stock. The meat is removed from the stock and carved individually for each customer; this prevents the meats from drying out.

== See also ==
Media related to Bollito misto at Wikimedia Commons

- List of stews

== Sources ==
- Beard, James (1981). The New James Beard. New York: Knopf. ISBN 1-50-400457-4.
- Caggiano, Biba (1991). Modern Italian Cooking. New York: Simon & Schuster. ISBN 0-67-175445-9.
- Carluccio, Antonio (2005). Carluccio's Italian Food. London: Alhambra. ISBN 978-1-84-400297-9.
- David, Elizabeth (1989) [1954]. Italian Food (sixth ed.). London: Penguin. ISBN 0-14-046841-2.
- Del Conte, Anna (2013). Gastronomy of Italy. London: Pavilion. ISBN 978-1-86-205958-0.
- Della Croce, Julia (2003). Veneto: Authentic Recipes from Venice and the Italian Northeast. San Francisco: Chronicle. ISBN 978-0-81-182350-0.
- Gray, Rose; Ruth Rogers (1995). The River Café Cookbook. London: Ebury Press. ISBN 0-09-181255-0.
- Grigson, Sophie (2000). Sophie Grigson's Sunshine Food. London: BBC. ISBN 0-56-355169-0.
- Hazan, Marcella (1976). The Classic Italian Cook Book. New York: Knopf. OCLC 1148189209.
- Jones, Bridget, ed. (2011). New Concise Larousse Gastronomique. London: Bounty. ISBN 978-0-75-372150-6.
- Little, Alastair (1994). Keep It Simple: A Fresh Look at Classic Cooking. Woodstock: Overlook Press. OCLC 1357504376.
- Mosimann, Anton (1996). Mosimann's World. London: Boxtree. ISBN 0-75-220511-0.
- Roden, Claudia (2003). The Food of Italy: Region by Region. South Royalton: Steerforth Press. OCLC 1348901940.
- Scaravella, Jody (2025). Nonna's House: Cooking and Reminiscing with the Italian Grandmothers of Enoteca Maria. New York: Atria. ISBN 978-1-47-677412-1.
- Torode, John (2008). Beef – And Other Bovine Matters. London: Quadrille. ISBN 978-1-84-400623-6.
- Waters, Alice (1999). Chez Panisse Café Cookbook. New York: HarperCollins. ISBN 0-06-235400-0.
