= Pot-au-feu =

French beef stew

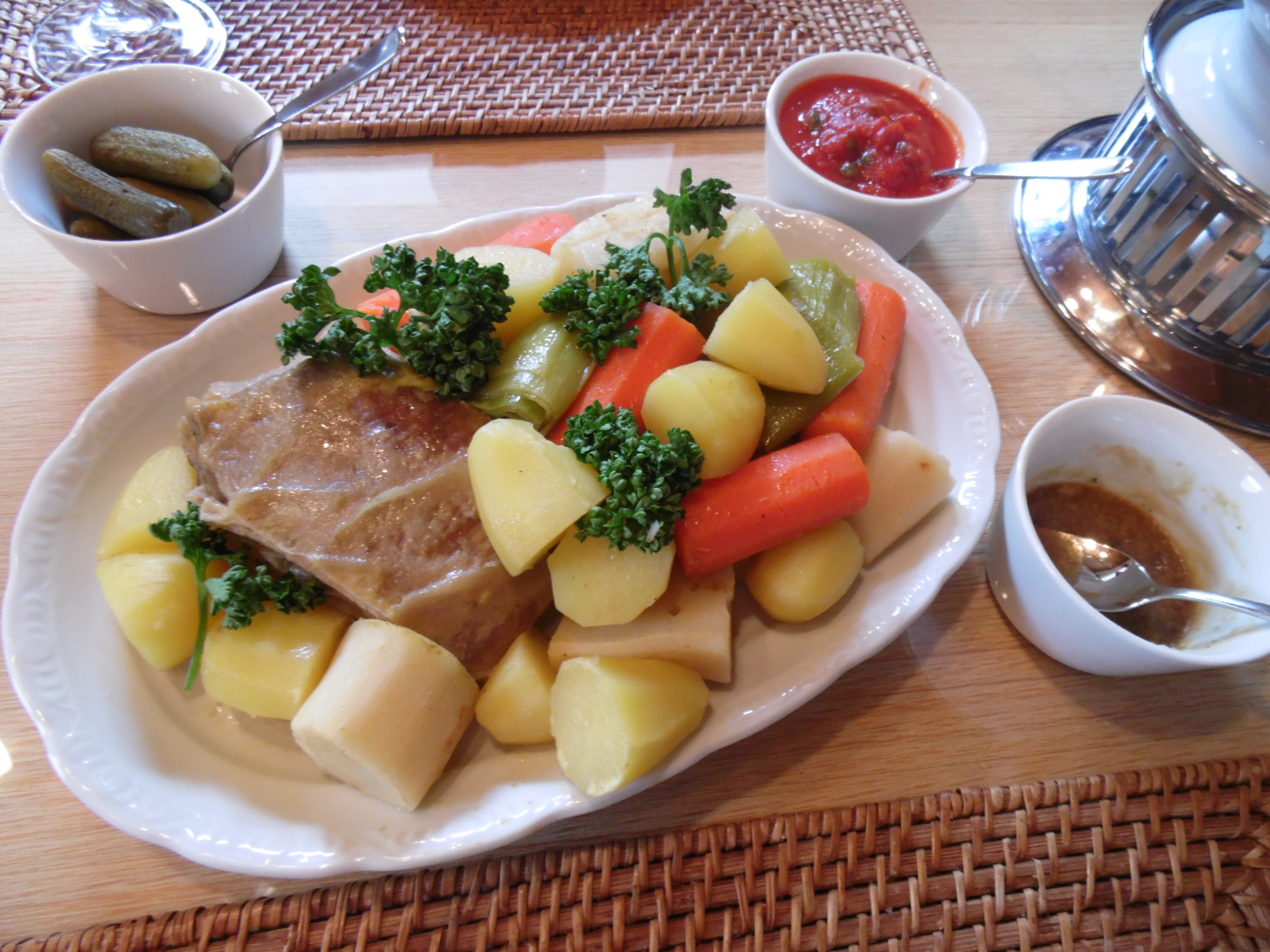
- Pot-au-feu with typical accompaniments
- Type: Main dish
- Place of origin: France
- Main ingredients: Meat and vegetables (typically, carrots, celery, leeks, onions and turnips)

Pot-au-feu (/ˌpɒtoʊˈfɜːr/, US also /-ˈfʌ/; French: [pɔt‿o fø]; lit. 'pot on the fire') is a French dish of slowly boiled meat and vegetables, usually served as two courses: first the broth (bouillon) and then the meat (bouilli) and vegetables. The dish is familiar throughout France and has many regional variations. The best-known have beef as the main meat, but pork, chicken, and sausage are also used.

== Background ==
The Oxford Companion to Food calls pot-au-feu "a dish symbolic of French cuisine and a meal in itself"; the chef Raymond Blanc has called it "the quintessence of French family cuisine ... the most celebrated dish in France, [which] honours the tables of the rich and poor alike"; and the American National Geographic magazine has termed it the national dish of France.

The Dictionnaire de l'Académie française dates the term pot-au-feu to the 17th century. In 1600, the king of France, Henry IV, declared, "there shall be no peasant in my kingdom who lacks the means to have a hen in his pot." (Note: "N'y aura point de Laboureur en mon Royaume, qui n'ait moyen d'avoir une poule dans son pot.") A one-pot stew was a staple of French cooking, and the traditional recipe for poule-au-pot – also known as pot-au-feu à la béarnaise – resembles that for pot-au-feu. (Note: Such one-pot, slow-cooked stews were earlier called a "pot-pourri": the term dates to at least 1564 in Middle French, and indicated a dish of mixed meats. The term, which was taken up in England in the 1600s, is related to the Spanish and Portuguese olla podrida.)

One batch of pot-au-feu was maintained as a perpetual stew in Perpignan from the 15th century until World War II.

== Ingredients ==
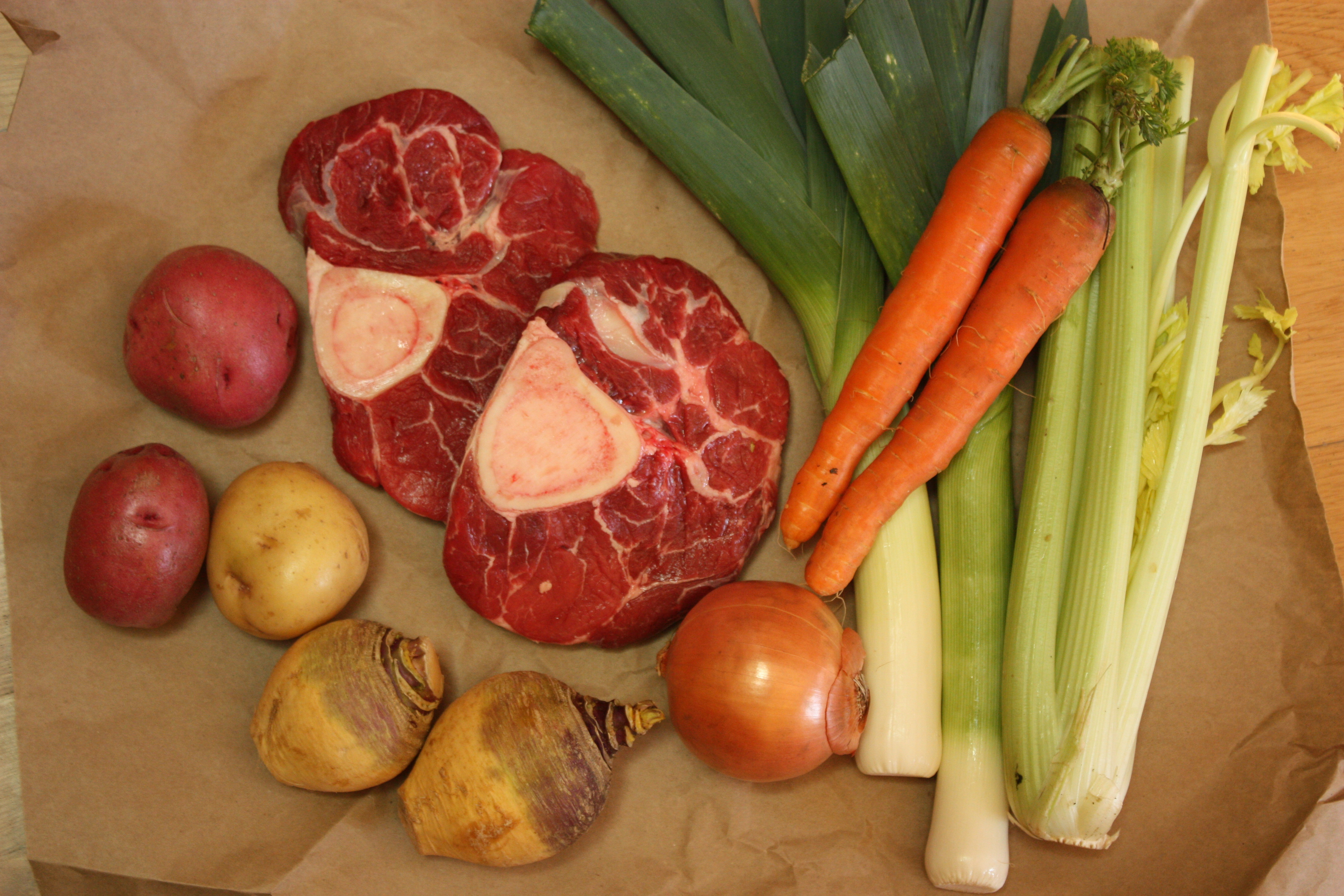
Some pot-au-feu ingredients: potato, beef shin, leek, carrot, celery, turnip and onion

The central ingredient in pot-au-feu is meat. Many recipes specify more than one cut of beef to give both the broth and the cooked meat the required flavour and consistency. Elizabeth David writes that shin, because of its gelatinous properties, is good for the bouillon but produces a mediocre bouilli, whereas a cut such as silverside cooks well for the bouilli. For a large pot-au-feu, it is practicable to use both those cuts or a mixture of others. Paul Bocuse calls for six different cuts: blade, brisket, entrecôte, oxtail, rib, and shin. Some recipes add a marrow bone, to give marrow to spread on the bread served with the broth. Some recipes add ox liver to improve the clarity of the broth.

The inclusion of cabbage divides opinion; David comments that it is frequently encountered in France, but in her view, it "utterly wrecks" a pot-au-feu; Madame Saint-Ange takes a similar view. (Note: Saint-Ange and David suggest that if cabbage is to be served with a pot-au-feu it is cooked separately in a little of the bouillon from the main pot.) Blanc, Édouard de Pomiane, and Auguste Escoffier include it; Bocuse, Alain Ducasse, and Joël Robuchon omit it, as do Simone Beck, Louisette Bertholle, and Julia Child, authors of Mastering the Art of French Cooking. As well as a bouquet garni – traditionally made of parsley, thyme and bay – an onion studded with cloves may be added to the pot.

Cook/writer	Meats	Vegetables	Ref.
Beck, Bertholle and Child	beef; pork; chicken; sausage	carrots; leeks; onions; turnips	
Raymond Blanc	ham hock; beef; bacon; sausage	cabbage; carrots; celery; onions; turnips	
Paul Bocuse	beef; veal; chicken	carrots; celeriac; fennel; leeks; onions; parsnips; tomatoes; turnips	
Elizabeth David	beef; veal; chicken giblets	carrots; celery; leeks; onions; parsnip; pea pods; tomato; turnips	
Édouard de Pomiane	beef rib; calf's head; Morteau sausage	cabbage; carrots; leeks; turnips	
Alain Ducasse	beef	carrots; leeks; onions; turnips; potatoes	
Auguste Escoffier	beef; necks, wings and gizzards of fowl (unspecified)	cabbage; carrots; celery; leeks; turnips	
Larousse	beef; chicken or duck or turkey	cabbage; carrots; celery; leeks; turnips	
Joël Robuchon	beef; veal; chicken; duck	carrot tops; celery; leeks; onions; turnips or parsnips	
Madame Saint-Ange	beef; necks, wings and gizzards of chicken	carrots; celery; leeks; onions; parsnips; turnips	

Regional variations include:

- pot-au-feu à l'albigeoise – with veal knuckle, salted pork knuckle, confit goose and sausage, in addition to beef and chicken.
- pot-au-feu à la béarnaise, also called Poule-au-pot– the basic pot-au-feu with a chicken stuffed with a forcemeat made of fresh pork and chopped ham, onion, garlic, parsley and chicken liver.
- pot-au-feu à la languedocienne – the basic pot-au-feu with the addition of a piece of fat bacon.
- pot-au-feu provençal – lamb or mutton replaces some of the beef.
- pot-au-feu aux pruneaux – the meats are beef and lightly-salted pork knuckle, cooked with the usual vegetables but adding prunes soaked in Armagnac.
- pot-au-feu madrilène – the meats are chicken, beef, veal, ham, bacon, chorizo sausage and boudin noir.

== Serving ==
Generally, the broth (bouillon) is served first. It is often enriched with rice or pasta, and croutons and grated cheese may be added, before it is served with French bread. The meat (bouilli) and the vegetables are served next. Condiments may include, among other options, coarse salt, mustard, capers, pickled gherkins, pickled samphire and horseradish – grated or in a sauce.

Sauces served with the bouilli may include tomato sauce, Sauce gribiche, an Alsacienne sauce (hard-boiled egg mayonnaise with herbs, capers and some of the bouillon), sauce Nénette (cream reduced by simmering and flavoured with mustard and tomato), or sauce Suprême (a velouté made with some of the bouillon and enriched with cream).

Pot-au-feu broth may also be used for cooking vegetables or pasta. Ready-to-use concentrated cubes are also available.

== See also ==
- Bigos
- Bollito misto
- Cazuela
- Cholent
- Cocido
- Cozido à portuguesa
- Sancochado (Peruvian)
- Eintopf
- Feu
- Hot pot (Steamboat)
- Jjigae
- Kig ha farz
- Lancashire hotpot
- List of stews
- New England boiled dinner
- Oden
- Olla podrida
- Perpetual stew
- Pho
- Pot roast
- Puchero
- Stew
- Potjiekos
- Tafelspitz
