= Olla podrida =

Spanish stew made with chickpeas and beans

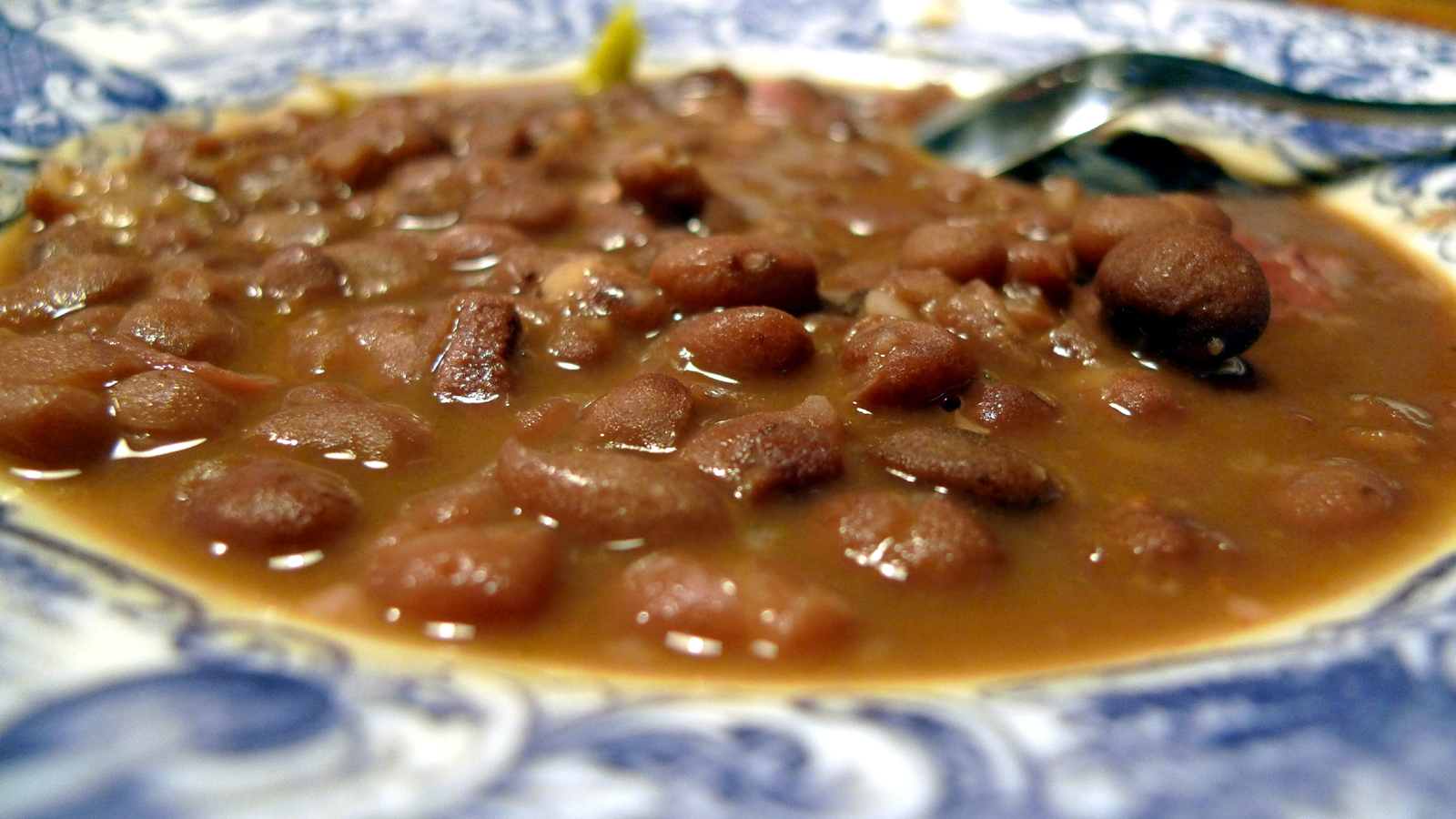
- Type: Stew
- Course: Main course
- Place of origin: Spain
- Main ingredients: Meats (can be beef, mutton, pork, chicken, ham, sausages, bacon), chickpeas and vegetables

Olla podrida (/ˌɒlə poʊˈdriːdə, - pəˈ-/, also UK: /- pɒˈ-/, US: /ˌɔɪə pəˈ-/, Spanish: [ˈoʎa poˈðɾiða]; literally "rotten pot", although podrida is probably a version of the original word poderida, so it could be translated as "strong pot") is a Spanish stew, usually made with chickpeas or beans, assorted meats like pork, beef, bacon, partridge, chicken, ham, and sausage, and vegetables such as carrots, leeks, cabbage, potatoes, and onions.

Spaniards traditionally prepare olla podrida in a clay pot over several hours. It is eaten as a main course, sometimes as a single dish, and sometimes with ingredients separated (i.e., meats from the rest or liquids from solids). It is a specialty of the city of Burgos.

The recipe can be found in Opera dell’arte del cucinare by Bartolomeo Scappi, the cook of Pope Pius V, published in 1570. This recipe was translated into Dutch by Antonius Magirus for the Koock-boeck oft Familieren kevken-boeck, first published in Leuven in 1612.

By the 1640s the word olla, meaning "pot" or "stew", was adapted into English as "olio", an obsolete sense of which the Oxford English Dictionary defines as "a spiced meat and vegetable stew of Spanish and Portuguese origin. Hence, any dish containing a great variety of ingredients."

== See also ==
- Cocido
- List of legume dishes
- List of stews
- Olla
- Pot-au-feu
- Pot-pourri
- Sancocho
