= Fabada asturiana =

Asturian bean stew

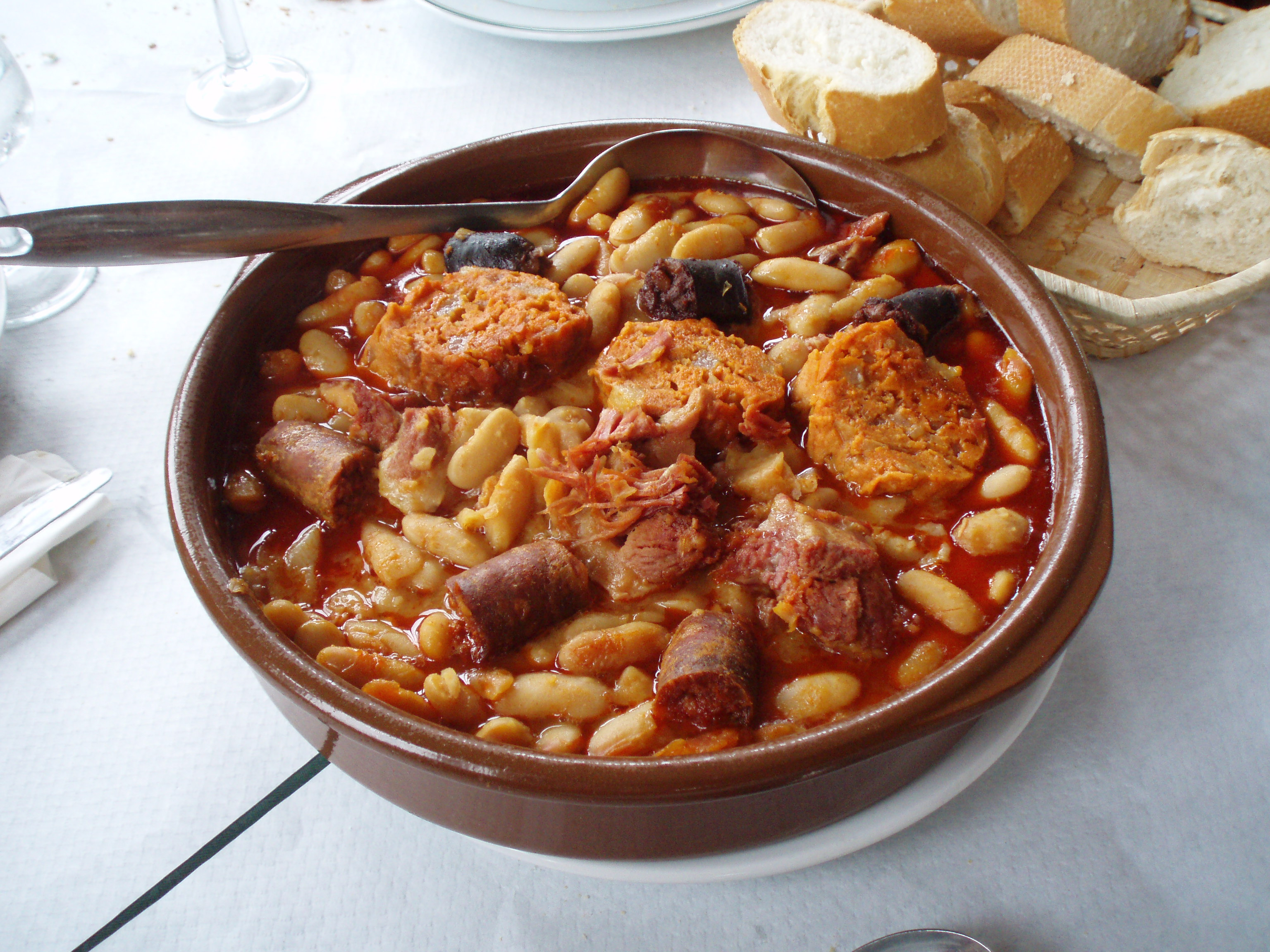
- Fabada asturiana
- Alternative names: Fabada
- Type: Stew
- Course: Appetiser or main course
- Place of origin: Spain
- Region or state: Asturias
- Serving temperature: Hot
- Main ingredients: White beans
- Variations: Olla podrida, cassoulet

Fabada asturiana, often simply known as fabada, is a rich Asturian bean stew, originally from and most commonly found in the autonomous community of Principality of Asturias, but widely available throughout the whole of Spain and in Spanish restaurants worldwide. Canned fabada is sold in most supermarkets across the country.

Fabada is a hot and heavy dish, and for that reason, it is most commonly eaten during the winter and as the largest meal of the day, lunch. It is usually served as a starter but may also be the main course of the meal. It is typically served with Asturian cider or a red wine.

== Ingredients ==
Fabada is made with fabes de la Granja (a kind of large white bean from Spain) soaked overnight before use; lacón (shoulder of pork); pancetta or bacon (tocino), morcilla (a kind of blood sausage from Spain); chorizo, olive oil, sweet paprika, garlic, and salt.

== History ==
The consumption of fabes goes back in Asturias to the 16th century, in which it is known with certainty that they were planted in the territory and consumed. The variety used in fabada is called de la Granja; it is a smooth and buttery variety appropriate for this dish. The cultivation of this variety occupies about 2,500 hectares in Asturias. The ingredients of the fabada recipe reveal a humble origin. Scholars think it may have been born in the 18th century, although there is no evidence to support this. Despite the fact that fabas are a purely rural ingredient, the belief that fabada is born in the cities is maintained. There are no written literary references to fabas in any of the works of the time. One of the best known, La Regenta, does not mention it despite making an exhaustive description of the customs of the region. Other authors mention its resemblance to the Languedoc cassoulet from French cuisine that could have reached Spain thanks to the Camino de Santiago via the French route in the Middle Ages.

The first written reference to fabada appears in the Asturian newspaper of Gijón El Comercio in 1884, but does not mention a recipe. Later appearances in Asturian culinary literature relate the dish to the Asturian pot; authors such as Armando Palacio Valdés, when describing the characteristics of Asturian shepherds in his work "Pastoral Symphony" (1931), does not mention the dish. According to the research of different experts, fabada is born in an undetermined period between the 19th and 20th centuries. Some authors lean more towards the twentieth century, but today it is already a well-known dish, not only in Asturias but throughout the Spanish territory. Recipes appear in the literature of the beginning of the century.

Asturian emigrants around the world noticed this dish in other places, in this way there are variants of this dish in some places, such as in the areas near the American city of Tampa.

In Colombia, the bandeja paisa is a Creole adaptation of the fabada, replacing the fabas with red ball beans (soaked for 16 hours) cooked with pork leg, garlic, onion, and salt, accompanied by chorizo, pork rinds, cooked ground meat (often beef), fried egg, sliced avocado, and white rice.

== Variations ==
Outside Asturias, the Spanish olla podrida, southern French cassoulet, and Portuguese-Brazilian feijoada are similar to fabada asturiana.

== Images ==
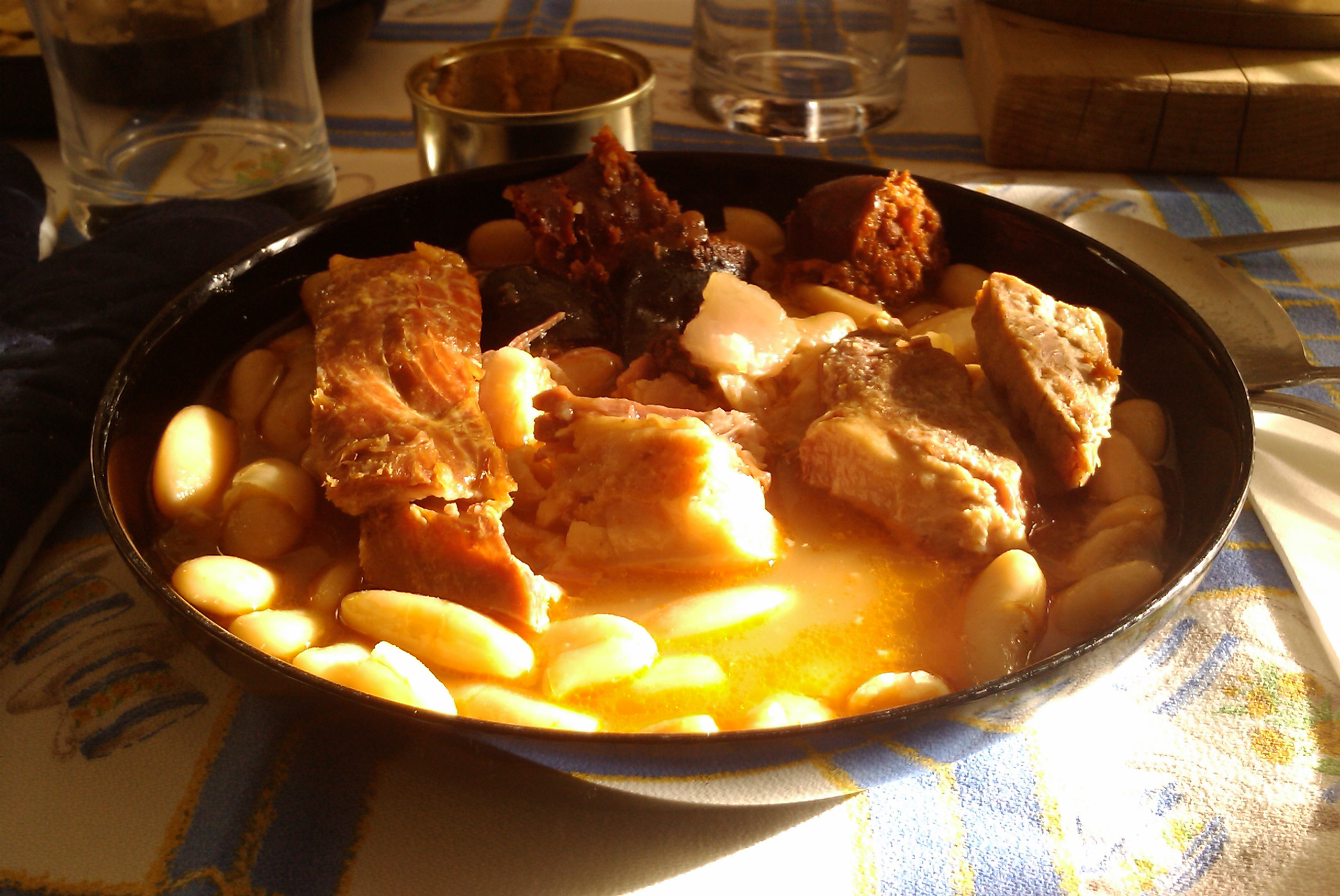
A prepared fabada

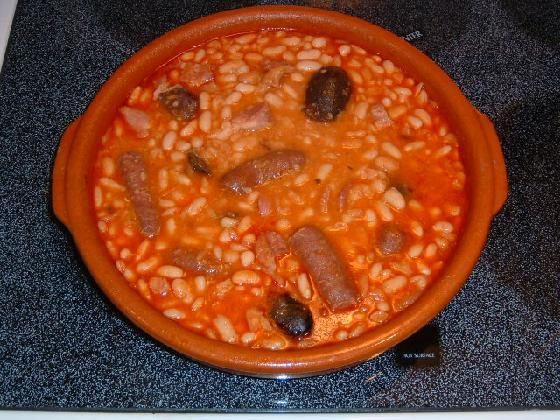
Fabada prepared in a traditional clay cazuela

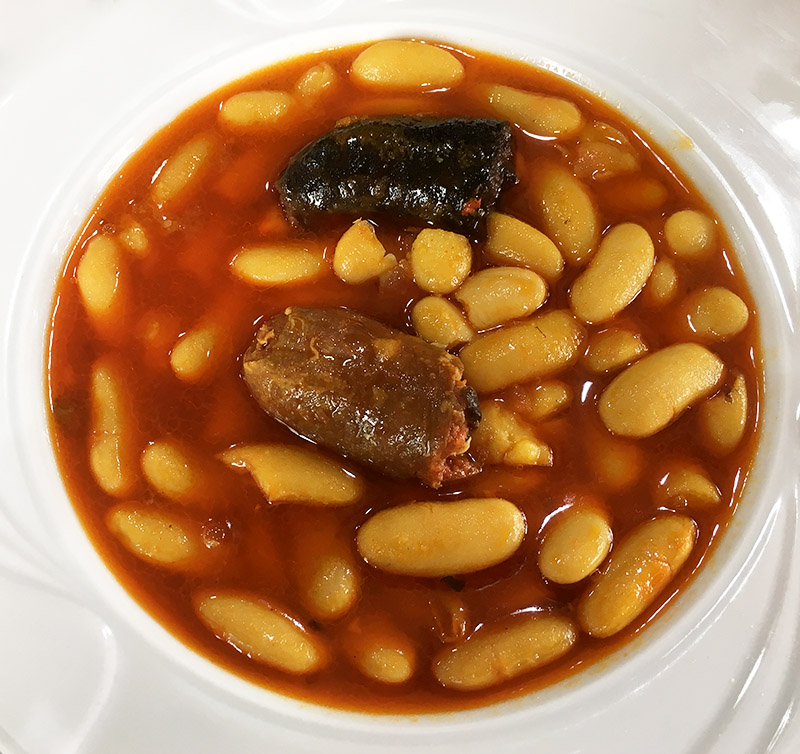
Fabada prepared with the traditional recipe

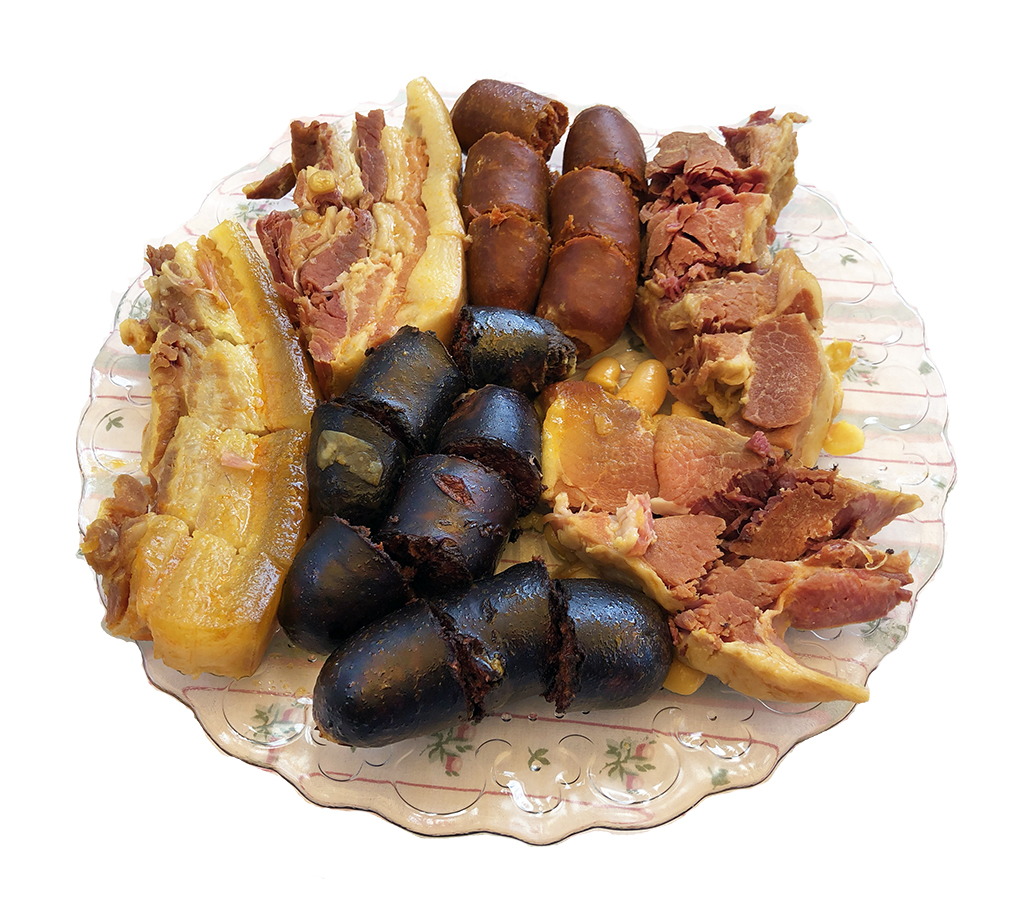
Accompanying meats with the fabada

== See also ==
- Cassoulet
- Cassoueula
- Feijoada
- Olla podrida
- Pork and beans
- Baked beans
- Fabes con almejas (cookbook entry)
- List of pork dishes
- List of stews
- Common bean (Phaseolus vulgaris)
