= List of stews =

A stew is a combination of solid food ingredients that have been cooked in liquid and served in the resultant gravy. Ingredients in a stew can include any combination of vegetables, such as carrots, potatoes, beans, onions, peppers, tomatoes, and others, and frequently with meat, especially tougher meats suitable for moist, slow cooking, such as beef chuck or round. Poultry, pork, lamb or mutton, sausages, and seafood are also used.

== Stews ==
Name	Image	Origin	Traditional protein	Description
Ají de gallina		Peru	Fowl	Peruvian chicken stew
Alicot		France	Offal	Stew made with poultry giblets and possibly the head, feet and wing tips
Andrajos		Spain (Jaén)	Game	Stew of tomatoes, onions, garlic, red pepper, and rabbit, thickened with cake flour
Asam pedas		Indonesia; Malaysia	Fish	Sour and spicy stew dish made of seafood, typically fish, cooked in tamarind fruit juice, chili, and other spices
Balbacua		Philippines	Beef	Beef stew made from beef and collagen-rich parts of beef stewed for four to six hours in various spices
Bamia		Egypt	Lamb	Stew prepared with okra and lamb as primary ingredients
Beef bourguignon		France (Burgundy)	Beef	Stew made of beef braised in red wine, traditionally red Burgundy, and beef broth, generally flavoured with garlic, onions, and a bouquet garni, with pearl onions and mushrooms
Beef Stroganoff		Russia; France	Beef	Beef Stroganoff or beef Stroganov (Russian: бефстроганов befstróganov) is a Russian dish of sautéed pieces of beef served in a sauce with smetana (sour cream).
Beaver stew		Lithuania	Beaver	Stew made beaver meat, mashed potatoes and various vegetables
Bicol express		Philippines	Pork or beef	Stew made from long chillies, pork or beef, coconut milk, shrimp paste or stockfish, onions, pork, and garlic
Bigos		Poland; Ukraine; Lithuania	Pork	Stew that features white cabbage, sauerkraut, various cuts of meat and sausages, often whole or puréed tomatoes, honey, and mushrooms
Birnen, Bohnen und Speck		Germany	Pork	Typical dish in which pears, beans, and bacon are cooked together
Birria		Mexico	Goat	Spicy meat stew made of pork, goat, lamb, or mutton that is traditionally served on holidays, such as Christmas
Blanquette de veau		France	Veal	Bright veal ragout with mirepoix
Blindhuhn		Germany (Westphalia)	Pork	A stew of the Westphalian cuisine prepared with beans, vegetables, and bacon
Bo kho (Vietnamese: bò kho)		Vietnam	Beef	A beef stew in rich seasonings, served with bread, noodle or plain rice
Bollito misto		Italy	Various	A stew consisting of beef, veal, and pork simmered in an aromatic vegetable broth
Booyah		United States (Upper Midwest)	Various	Thick stew popular in the Upper Midwestern United States with meat and vegetables, often prepared communally in large kettles, with several different meats
Bosanski lonac		Bosnia and Herzegovina	Lamb	Typical Bosnian dish with beef, lamb, cabbage, potatoes, tomatoes, carrots, parsley, garlic, and peppercorns (whole, not ground)
Bouillabaisse		France (Marseille)	Seafood	Bony fish and seafood stew with vegetables and Provençal herbs and spices: The name refers to a "simmering boil", the temperature of cooking the stew.
Brongkos		Indonesia (Yogyakarta and Central Java)	Beef	Meat (beef or mutton) with beans (black-eyed peas or kidney beans) stew, with boiled egg and spicy soup made of Pangium edule, coconut milk, and other spices
Brodetto		Italy	Fish	Fish stew typical of the Eastern (Adriatic) coast of Italy: It may slightly vary from place to place. In Veneto, it is eaten with polenta. In Abruzzo, tomato sauce is added. It is similar to Croatian brudet.
Brudet		Croatia; Montenegro	Fish	A fish stew that is usually eaten with polenta, similar to Italian brodetto
Brunswick stew		United States (South)	Game	Tomato-based stew containing various types of lima beans or butter beans, corn, okra, and other vegetables, and one or more types of meat: Most recipes claiming authenticity call for squirrel or rabbit meat, but chicken, pork, and beef are also common ingredients.
Trippa alla milanese (Buseca in South America)		Italy; Argentina; Uruguay	Offal	Italian stew also common in Uruguay and Argentina, similar to Spanish callos, it is made of finely chopped mondongo (beef tripe), potatoes, and legumes such as lentils or chickpeas.
Buddha Jumps Over the Wall		China	Fish	Cantonese variation on shark fin soup
Buğu kebabı		Turkey	Lamb	Turkish lamb and vegetable stew with a kebab name
Burgoo		United States (Midwest and South)	Game	Traditionally made with wild game, this spicy thick stew is similar to Irish or Mulligan stew, often served with cornbread or corn muffins. Often prepared communally, it is made with several different meats.
Cabbage stew		Central Europe	Vegetarian	Prepared using cabbage as a main ingredient: Pictured is kapuska.
Cacciatore		Italy	Fowl	A stew with braised chicken (pollo alla cacciatora), sometimes with rabbit (coniglio alla cacciatora), tomatoes, onions, herbs, often bell peppers, and sometimes wine.
Cacciucco		Italy	Fish	A fish stew, it is made with several different types of fish and shellfish cooked in wine, tomatoes, and chili pepper, as typical of west-central Italy and especially Livorno.
Cachupa		Cape Verde	Goat	Slow-cooked stew of corn (hominy), beans, and fish or meat (sausage, beef, goat, or chicken)
Caldeirada		Portugal	Seafood	Stew consisting of a large variety of fish, and sometimes shellfish, with potatoes, tomatoes and onions
Caldereta de cordero		Spain	Lamb	Lamb or mutton stew
Caldo avá		Paraguay	Offal	Stew made of beef tripes, chitterlings, heart, and matambre
Caldo gallego		Spain	Pork	Stew made with fatty pork, white beans, and greens (cabbage or spring greens), literally means "Galician broth"
Callaloo		Caribbean; West Africa	Vegetarian	Caribbean dish made of leaf vegetables, amaranth, capsicum, and taro
Callos		Spain	Offal	A stew common across Spain, it is considered traditional to Madrid, where it is referred to as callos a la madrileña. It contains beef tripe and chickpeas, blood sausage, and bell peppers. Chorizo sausage may also be used.
Caparrones		Spain (La Rioja)	Sausage	Stew made of caparrón (a variety of red kidney beans) and a spicy chorizo sausage
Caponata		Italy (Sicily)	Vegetarian	Vegetable stew from Sicily that consists mainly of aubergine (eggplant) tomato sauce, onions, celery, olives, capers, and Agrodolce.
Capra e fagioli		Italy (Liguria)	Goat	Stew made of goat meat, white wine, and white pigna beans
Carbonada		Argentina, Uruguay	Beef	Traditional Argentinian and Uruguayan sweet-sour beef, squash, and apricot stew, traditionally served inside a squash
Carbonade flamande		Belgium, France	Beef	Traditional Belgian sweet-sour beef and onion stew made with beer, and seasoned with thyme and bay leaf: Pictured is carbonade flamande with fries and a side of greens.
Carne mechada		Colombia; Chile; Venezuela	Beef	Latin American beef stew
Cassoulet		France (Languedoc)	Fowl and sausage	French dish that consists of slow-cooked meat, typically pork sausages, pork, goose, duck, and sometimes mutton, with white haricot beans
Cawl		United Kingdom (Wales)	Lamb	Lamb stew (beef or hock in Pembrokeshire), which includes vegetables, such as leeks and potatoes, as well as carrots, celery, onion, parsnip, swede, and turnip
Chairo		Bolivia	Beef	Meat and vegetable stew with potato starch (chuños), onions, carrots, potatoes, white corn, beef, and wheat kernels
Chakapuli		Georgia	Lamb	Popular stew with lamb chops or veal, onions, tarragon leaves, cherry plums or tkemali (cherry plum sauce), dry white wine, mixed fresh herbs (parsley, mint, dill, coriander), garlic, and salt
Chanakhi		Georgia	Lamb	A lamb stew with tomatoes, aubergines, potatoes, greens, and garlic
Chapea		Dominican Republic	Sausage	Traditional dish from the countryside that consists of cooked red beans with longaniza (Dominican sausage), rice, ripe plantain, and mashed squash used as a thickener
Charquicán		Chile		
Chicken mull		United States (South)	Fowl	A traditional dish from North Carolina and Georgia, it consists of parboiled whole chicken in a cream- or milk-based broth with butter, seasoned with salt, white or black pepper, and other ingredients. Traditionally, the stew is served in the late fall and winter, often prepared communally.
Chicken paprikash		Hungary	Chicken	Chicken stew with paprika
Chicken pastel		Philippines	Chicken or pork	Stew or pie made with chicken, sometimes pork, sausages, mushrooms, peas, carrots, potatoes, soy sauce, and various spices in a creamy sauce
Chili con carne		Mexico	Beef	A spicy stew that traditionally features chopped or ground beef, chili peppers, and other ingredients
Chilorio		Mexico (Sinaloa)	Pork	
Cholent		France	Beef, chicken or goose	Slowly simmered Jewish stew of Ashkenazi origin that cooks overnight and is traditionally served at the Shabbat meal. Its main ingredients are meat, onions, potatoes, beans or chickpeas, and barley. It is believed to be derived from the hamin of Sephardic Jews. Similar to the French cassoulet.
Chorba (also spelt "shorba")		Various		A stew-like soup dish found in various North African, Middle Eastern, Central Asian, South Asian, and European cuisines
Chraime		Maghreb	Fish	Fish stewed with tomatoes and peppers, flavored with hot peppers and spices
Chupe Andino		Andes	Game	Refers to various stews and soups that are prepared in Andes Mountains region of South America
Chupín		Uruguay	Fish	Made with any fish of firm meat, usually hake, croaker, or boga, potatoes, tomatoes, and onions, crumbs of marine crackers are usually poured over at the end.
Ciambotta		Italy	Vegetarian	Typically based on vegetables, but it may have other ingredients, such as meat or fish. The vegetable choices are usually potatoes, eggplant, tomatoes, sweet peppers, chili, onion and herbs.
Cioppino		United States (San Francisco)	Fish	An Italian-American fish stew, it is traditionally made from the catch of the day, which in the dish's place of origin is typically a combination of Dungeness crab, clams, shrimp, scallops, squid, mussels, and fish. The seafood is then combined with fresh tomatoes in a wine sauce, and served with toasted bread, either sourdough or baguette.
Cochinita pibil		Mexico (Yucatán Peninsula)	Pork	An orange-colored pork stew
Cocido lebaniego		Spain (Cantabria)	Pork and offal	Its essential ingredients include chickpeas, potatoes, and collard greens. The rest of the elements are compangu, meat from the pig slaughter, such as bacon (tocino), black pudding (morcilla), chorizo, and ham. Other additional ingredients are beef, especially cecina and bones, and a stuffing made of bread flour, egg, and parsley.
Cocido madrileño		Spain (Madrid)	Pork	Its main ingredient is the chickpea or garbanzo bean, preferably of its larger variety, also known as kabuli. Vegetables are added, potatoes mainly, but also cabbage, carrots, and turnips. In some cases, green beans, mangold, or cardoon are added. Meats like beef, hen, lard, chorizo, a small block of cured Jamón and morcilla (a type of black pudding) complete the ingredients. Cocido is commonly served with the ingredient types grouped, and the broth served as first course, with very thin pasta, fideo cabellín added.
Cocido montañés		Spain (Cantabria)	Pork and offal	Also known as highlander stew. It is made with two vegetal ingredients, dried large white beans and collard greens (berza). The rest of the elements of this recipe are known as compangu, meat ingredients from the pig slaughter: bacon (tocino), pork ribs (costilla), black pudding (morcilla) with rice, and chorizo.
Coddle		Ireland	Pork saussage and bacon	
Compote			Game	Game stew made for example from rabbit, partridge, or pigeon
Coq au vin		France	Fowl	French braise of chicken cooked with wine, lardons, mushrooms, and optionally garlic
Cotriade		France (Brittany)	Fish	Breton-style stew made with potatoes and many kinds of fish, but without shellfish
Cozido/Cocido		Portugal; Spain	Various	Stew made with different meats and vegetables; numerous regional variations exist throughout Portugal and Spain.
Cream stew		Japan	Various	Cream stew is a Japanese Yōshoku dish consisting of meat, usually chicken or pork, and mixed vegetables, onion, carrot, potato and cabbage, cooked in thick white roux.
Crow stew		United States	Fowl (crow)	A sour cream-based stew made with crow meat, popular in the United States during the Great Depression
Daal		Various	Legumes	Indian legume stew that has many varieties, a staple food throughout Asia
Daube		France (Provence)	Beef	Classic Provençal stew made with inexpensive beef braised in wine, vegetables, garlic, and herbes de Provence, and traditionally cooked in a daubière, a braising pan.
Dillegrout		United Kingdom (England)	Fowl	Chicken pottage made with almond milk, sugar, and spices traditionally presented at coronations of English monarchs by the lord of the manor of Addington.
Dimlama		Uzbekistan	Lamb	Stew made with various combinations of meat, potatoes, onions, vegetables, and sometimes fruits.
Dinuguan		Philippines	Offal	Filipino savory stew of meat or offal (typically lungs, kidneys, intestines, ears, heart and snout) simmered in a rich, spicy dark gravy of pig blood, garlic, chili (most often siling mahaba), and vinegar.
Drokpa Katsa		Tibet	Offal	Stewed tripe, with curry, fennel, monosodium glutamate, and salt.
Eintopf		Germany		Eintopf ('one pot') is the German word for a stew. Many different regional specialty recipes for Eintopf are known in Germany.
Escudella i carn d'olla		Spain (Catalonia)	Sausage	Stew that contains a pilota, a very big meatball spiced with garlic and parsley. It contains vegetables, such as celery, cabbage, carrots, etc. depending on the season. Bones, sausages called botifarras, and other types of meat can be used.
Estofadong baboy		Philippines	Pork	
Étouffée		United States (Louisiana)	Seafood	Seafood dish of the Creole cuisine of Louisiana that is usually served over rice. Literally means "smothered" in French.
Fabada asturiana		Spain (Asturias)	Pork	Fabada is made with dried large white beans (fabes de la Granja, soaked overnight before use), shoulder of pork (Lacón Gallego) or bacon (tocino), black pudding (morcilla), chorizo, and often saffron (azafrán). Some recipes also call for longaniza.
Fabes con almejas		Spain (Asturias)	Seafood	Clam stew that calls for small clams, fava beans, onions, garlic, salt, saffron, bay leaves, olive oil, parsley, bread crumbs and sometimes sweet paprika.
Fahsa		Yemen	Lamb	Stew made of lamb cutlets with lamb broth. Spices and holba (fenugreek) are added after cooking.
Fårikål		Norway	Lamb	Traditional dish, consisting of pieces of mutton with bone, cabbage, whole black pepper and optionally a little wheat flour, cooked for several hours in a casserole, traditionally served with potatoes boiled in their skins. Literally means "mutton in cabbage".
Fasole cu cârnaţi		Romania	Sausage	Dish consisting of baked beans, sausages or smoked ham.
Feijoada		Brazil; Portugal; Uruguay	Beef	Stew of beans with beef or pork, and may include other vegetables.
Fesenjān		Iran	Fowl	Thick, tart stew made from pomegranate juice and ground walnuts; traditionally made with poultry, but variants using balls of ground meat, ghormeh cut lamb, fish, or no meat at all are not unusual.
Flaki		Poland	Beef	Meat stew with common ingredients, including beef tripe, beef, bay leaf, parsley, carrots, beef broth, and spices to taste, including salt, black pepper, nutmeg, sweet paprika, and marjoram.
Főzelék		Hungary	Vegetarian	Very thick vegetable soup, so it may be considered a stew. Sometimes served with meatballs and often eaten as a side dish.
Fricot		Canada (Acadia)	Various	Consists of potatoes, onions, and whatever meat was available, cooked in a stew and topped with dumplings. The common meats used are chicken (fricot au poulet), clams (fricot aux coques), rabbit (fricot au lapin des bois), beef, or pork.
Gaisburger Marsch		Germany (Swabia)	Beef	Swabian dish made from meat with cooked potatoes and spätzle.
Galinhada		Brazil	Fowl	Stew of rice and chicken.
Garbure		France (Gascony)	Pork	Stew/soup of meat (e.g. goose, duck, salt pork, ham) with vegetables, mainly root vegetables.
Ghapama		Armenia	Vegetarian	Sweet pumpkin stew, traditionally cooked in the pumpkin shell; does not contain meat.
Gheimeh		Iran	Lamb	Stew consisting of diced lamb or sometimes beef, tomatoes, split peas, onion and dried lime, garnished with golden thinly sliced crispy potatoes. The stew is usually served with white rice.
Ghormeh sabzi		Iran	Vegetarian (but often made with lamb or beef)	Dish that consists of a mixture of sautéed herbs, consisting mainly of parsley, leek, and a smaller amount of fenugreek leaves, where this is usually the dry herb of the mix.
Ginataang kalabasa		Philippines	Shrimp	Stew of calabaza squash cooked in coconut milk and spices, along with shrimp and asparagus bean.
Ginataang labong		Philippines	Seafood or pork	Stew of bamboo shoots cooked in coconut milk and spices, along with seafood or various meats.
Goat water		Montserrat	Goat	A national dish of Montserrat prepared with goat meat and vegetables.
Goulash		Hungary	Beef	Soup or stew of meat, noodles and vegetables, especially potato, seasoned with paprika and other spices.
Guatitas		Chile; Ecuador	Offal	Stew whose main ingredient is pieces of tripe.
Guiso carrero		Argentina; Uruguay	Beef	Traditional stew made with beef, chorizo, white beans, chickpeas, potato, sweet potato, squash, carrots, onions and noodles, seasoned with adobo, a spice mix of oregano, thyme, cumin, paprika and chili.
Gulai		Indonesia; Malaysia	Various	Stew or curry made with either beef, poultry (chicken or duck meat), vegetables, seafood or lamb with bumbu spice mix cooked in coconut milk.
Gumbo		United States (Louisiana)	Seafood & sausage	Stew or soup that consists primarily of a strongly-flavored stock, with meat or shellfish, a thickener, and the vegetable "holy trinity" of celery, bell peppers, and onions.
Güveç		Turkey	Lamb	Vegetable and meat stew made with mutton or veal and common to Balkan countries.
Guyana Pepperpot		Guyana	Various	Stewed meat dish, strongly flavored with cinnamon, hot chili peppers, and cassareep, a special sauce made from the cassava root. Beef, pork, and mutton are the most popular meats used. Chicken is also used.
Hachee		Netherlands	Various	Traditional Dutch stew based on diced meat, fish or poultry, and vegetables.
Haleem		India Pakistan	Various	
Hamin		Iberia	Lamb, beef, or chicken	Traditional Sephardic Jewish Sabbath stew cooked overnight. Made from whole grains, meat, chickpeas or beans, and onion. Also known as dafina.
Hasenpfeffer		Germany	Game	Traditional German stew made from marinated rabbit or hare, cut into stewing-meat sized pieces and braised with onions and wine, in a marinade thickened with the animal's blood.
Hochepot		France	Beef	Flemish stew made with oxtail, shoulder of mutton, salted bacon, and vegetables.
Hoosh		United States	Beef (dried)	Thick stew made from pemmican (a mix of dried meat, fat, and cereal) or other meat, thickener such as ground biscuits, and water. Used on expeditions to frozen polar regions.
Hot pot		China; Taiwan; Mongolia	Various	Stew made with a variety of raw meats, seafood, vegetables, noodles, dumplings, etc., all cooked at the table in a simmering hot pot of broth.
Irish stew		Ireland	Lamb	Traditional stew made from lamb or mutton, as well as potatoes, carrots, onions, and parsley.
Islim or patlıcan kebabı		Turkey	Lamb	Traditional stew made from veal or mutton and eggplants, also having tomatoes and green peppers.
Istrian stew		Croatia	Pork	Stew prepared using beans, sauerkraut, potatoes, bacon, and spare ribs; the main seasoning is garlic.
Jjigae		Korea	Various	Stew prepared using meat, seafood or vegetables in a broth seasoned with gochujang (red chilli paste), doenjang (soy bean paste), ganjang (soy sauce) or saeu-jeot (salted and fermented shrimp).
Jugged hare		France; United Kingdom	Game	Stew prepared using rabbit or hare as a main ingredient.
Kaldereta		Philippines	Goat	
Kalops		Sweden Finland	Beef	A traditional Swedish beef stew, with onions and carrots, served with potatoes and pickled beets
Kadyos, baboy, kag langka		Philippines	Pork	Pigeon peas, ham hock, and jackfruit soured with batuan fruits (Garcinia binucao)
Kadyos, manok, kag ubad		Philippines	Fowl	Pigeon peas, chicken, and banana pith
Kaldereta		Philippines	Goat	Dish whose common ingredients are goat shoulders with tomato paste and liver spread.
Kalops		Sweden	Beef	Swedish stew made of beef, onion, allspice, bay leaves and sometimes carrots. Often eaten with beetroot and potatoes.
Kamounia		Sudan; Egypt; Tunisia	Beef	Beef and liver stew prepared with cumin
Kapuska		Turkey	Veal	Cabbage and veal stew.
Kare-kare		Philippines	Beef	Popular stew made from a peanut-based sauce with a variety of vegetables, stewed oxtail, beef, and occasionally offal or tripe. Meat variants may include goat meat or (rarely) chicken.
Karelian hot pot		Finland	Beef and pork	Traditionally made of a combination of pork and beef, but lamb can also be used. The hot pot is usually seasoned with black peppercorns and salt. Other seasonings such as allspice and bay leaf may be used too. Common vegetables such as carrot, onion, and root vegetables are acceptable additions to the stew.
Karhi		Indian subcontinent	Vegetarian	Spicy stew with a thick gravy based on chickpea flour (called besan in Urdu / Hindi). Contains vegetable fritters called pakoras, to which sour yoghurt is added to give it a little sour taste.
Khash		Armenia Azerbaijan	Beef or pork	A traditional Armenian/Azerbaijani dish of pig's or cow's feet
Khoresh karafs		Iran	Various	A celery stew, traditionally made with lamb (but various proteins can be used, including vegan versions).
Kig ha farz		France (Brittany)	Various	Stew consisting of various meats (hock, beef and lamb) simmered in a broth with carrots, potatoes, cabbage and a large buckwheat flour based dumpling. Literally means "meat and stuffing" in Breton. Known mainly in Finisterre.
Kokotxas		Spain (Basque Country)	Fish	A traditional dish of fatty fish stewed in white wine, garlic, flour and olive oil. Other variations include parsley.
Kontomire stew		Ghana	Fish (dried)	Cocoyam leaves braised with egusi, dried fish, tomatoes, peppers, and egg.
Korma		India; Pakistan; Bangladesh	Various	Meat and/or vegetables is seared, then braised with stock or yogurt kept below curdling temperature with a mixture of spices, including ground coriander, cumin, and Indian bay. Traditionally cooked in a pot set over a very low fire, with coals on the lid. A korma can be mildly spiced or fiery, and may use lamb, beef, chicken, fish. Some kormas combine meat and vegetables such as spinach or cauliflower.
Kuru fasulye		Turkey	Lamb	Stew consisting of dry beans, generally with meat (veal or mutton) and pastırma or sucuk in its broth, with tomato paste. Pictured here is the vegetarian variant.
Kuurdak		Central Asia	Goat	Stewed meat dish made with onion, animal fat, vegetable oil, lamb or mutton.
Kuzhambu, (also called Pulusu or Saaru, depending on region)		India (Southern)	Various	A range of stews from southern India based on tamarind broth and vegetables, meat or fish
Lancashire hotpot		United Kingdom (England)	Lamb	Dish made traditionally from lamb or mutton, and onion topped with sliced potatoes, left to bake in the oven all day in a heavy pot and on a low heat.
Läskisoosi		Finland	Pork	Pork chops grilled in butter with onions and flour, stirred in water with salt and pepper.
Lecsó		Hungary; Czech Republic	Vegetarian	Thick vegetable stew which features peppers, tomato, onion, lard, salt, sugar and ground paprika as a base recipe.
Linat-an		Philippines	Pork	Pork stew or soup from the Visayas and Mindanao islands of the Philippines that characteristically uses pork ribs, or other bony cuts of pork, simmered until very tender, lemongrass (tanglad), string beans, starchy ingredients for a thicker soup (usually taro), and various other vegetables.
Lobby		United Kingdom (North Staffordshire, England)	Corned beef	Stew or casserole made from corned beef or sometimes chicken, potatoes, carrots, peas, and onion.
Lobscouse		Norway	Beef	A Norwegian stew with beef, potato, onion, and carrot
Lobster stew		Spain (Menorca)	Seafood	Stew made from lobster, which is added to a sofrito with onion, tomato, garlic and parsley; then boiled, and is eaten with thin slices of bread.
Locro		Argentina; Bolivia; Chile; Ecuador; Peru	Beef	Hearty thick stew whose main ingredients are corn, some form of meat, usually beef, pork, and chorizo, but sometimes beef jerky or cheese, and vegetables. Other ingredients vary widely, and typically include onion, beans, potato, squash or pumpkin.
Lunggoi Katsa		Tibet	Offal	Dish consisting of stewed sheep's head, with curry, fennel, monosodium glutamate, and salt.
Maafe		West Africa	Various	Stew that is made from lamb, beef, or chicken, cooked with a sauce based on tomatoes and groundnuts (peanuts).
Maconochie		United Kingdom (England)	Beef	Stew of sliced turnips and carrots in a thin soup that was especially made by the "Maconochie Company" for soldiers during World War I
Maneštra		Croatia	Various	Stew of beans and potatoes which may include meat or spring corn (bobići).
Matelote		France	Fish	A French fish stew made with freshwater fish, fish stock, and wine
Mazamorra		Latin America; Portugal; Spain	Milk	Sweet stew prepared with corn (maize) as a primary ingredient.
Mechado		Philippines	Beef	A stew traditionally made with larded beef, but now also made with leaner cuts. Marinating in soy sauce and calamansi juice give it a Filipino flavor.
Menudo		Philippines	Various; Offal	Liver and beef or pork stewed in a tomato sauce with carrots and potatoes. A variation called waknatoy uses pickle relish and does not typically include other vegetables
Mjave lobio		Georgia	Vegetarian	Dish of stewed beans, tomatoes and onion.
Moambe		Central Africa	Fowl	Dish prepared with a sauce usually made from the pericarp (not the seeds) of palm nuts, the fruit of the African oil palm.
Mocotó		Brazil; Portugal	Offal	Dish made from cow's feet, stewed with beans and vegetables.
Molagoottal		India	Vegetarian	South Indian stew with coconut and lentils as a base.
Moqueca		Brazil	Seafood	Stew based on fish or shrimp, tomatoes, onions, garlic and coriander.
Mućkalica		Serbia		
Mulligan stew		United States	Various	Dish similar to Irish stew, Brunswick stew, or burgoo, as improvised by American hobos from available or scavenged ingredients, such as squirrel or opossum.
Navarin		France	Lamb	French ragoût (stew) of lamb or mutton. Often, vegetables are added.
Ndolé		Cameroon	Fish	National dish of Cameroon, a stew of nuts, ndoleh (bitter leaves indigenous to West Africa), and fish or ground beef.
Nihari		Indian subcontinent	Various	South Asian dish consists of slow-cooked meat, mainly a shank cut of beef, lamb, mutton or goat meat, as well as chicken and bone marrow. It is flavoured with long pepper (pippali), a relative of black pepper.
Nikujaga		Japan	Pork or beef	Japanese dish of meat (either beef or pork), potatoes and onion stewed in sweetened soy sauce, sometimes with ito konnyaku and vegetables.
Nilaga		Philippines	Beef	A traditional meat stew or soup from the Philippines made with boiled beef (nilagang baka) or pork (nilagang baboy) with various vegetables. It is typically eaten with white rice and is served with soy sauce, patis (fish sauce), labuyo chilis, and calamansi on the side.
Oil down		Grenada	Fowl	Stew made of breadfruit, salted meat, chicken, dumplings, callaloo, and other vegetables, all stewed in coconut milk, herbs, and spices. National dish of Grenada, but also popular in Trinidad and Tobago, with hot peppers and no dumplings.
Olla podrida		Spain	Pork	Spanish stew made from pork and beans and an inconsistent, wide variety of other meats and vegetables, often including chickpeas, depending on the recipe used.
Ollada		Spain (Valencia)	Sausage	Stew based on boiling vegetables and meat in a casserole.
Or lam		Laos	Various	A thick, peppery broth seasoned primarily with Lao chili wood (sakhaan), chili pepper, and lemongrass. Dried water buffalo skin, beef, game meat, quail or chicken, eggplants, wood ear mushrooms, and asparagus bean.
Ostrich stew		South Africa	Fowl	Ostrich stew is a stew prepared using ostrich meat as a primary ingredient. Can include vegetables such as onion, celery and carrot, tomatoes, soup stock and wine.
Ostropel		Romania	Fowl	Stew that is primarily made from chicken mixed with a thick tomato sauce.
Oyster stew		United States	Seafood	Stew made from oysters with milk and cream
Oxtail Stew		France	Oxtail, usually with root vegetables	There are numerous oxtail stews in French cuisine: Auguste Escoffier and others have published many recipes for variations on oxtail stew.
Paya		Pakistan; India	Goat	Stew made with alliums, ginger, spices, and goat or sheep trotters. Coveted for its spicy and fatty broth which is rich in gelatin and animal fat, both rendered from the trotter bones and joints. It is preferred as breakfast with Naan bread.
Paila marina		Chile	Seafood	Typical stew that is usually made of a shellfish stock containing different kinds of cooked shellfish and fish. These are complemented with a variety of herbs and spices such as garlic, cilantro, and onion.
Palaver sauce		West Africa	Various	Stew popular in Western Africa that has many regional varieties and may contain beef, fish, shrimp, pepitas, cassava, taro (cocoyam) leaves, and palm oil. It is served with boiled rice, potatoes, garri, fufu, or yams.
Paomo		China	Lamb	Stew of chopped-up baked unleavened bread cooked in lamb broth and served with lamb meat. It is often eaten with pickled garlic and chilli sauce.
Pasulj		Serbia; Montenegro; Bosnia; Croatia; Slovenia	Sausage	Also known as grah. Bean soup made of white, cranberry or pinto beans, usually prepared with smoked meat such as smoked bacon, sausage, and ham hock. This is a typical winter dish.
Pepián		Guatemala	Various	Beef or chicken stewed with tomatillo, tomato, and chili pepper and thickened with gourd seeds
Peperonata		Italy		An Italian stew made with peppers
Philadelphia Pepper Pot		United States (Pennsylvania)	Offal	Thick stew of beef tripe, vegetables and other seasonings; originates in the cuisine of the Pennsylvania Dutch.
Pichelsteiner		Germany	Various	German stew that consists of several types of meats and vegetables. Common ingredients are beef, pork and mutton, as well as potatoes, carrots and leek.
Pinangat		Philippines	Fish	Filipino stew made of taro leaves, chilli, meat and coconut milk wrapped in gabi leaves and tied securely with coconut leaf.
Pindang		Indonesia; Malaysia	Fish	Stew made of by boiling ingredients, especially fish, in salt and certain spices.
Piperade		France (Basque)	Vegetarian	Typical Basque dish prepared with onion, green peppers, and tomatoes sautéed and flavored with red Espelette pepper.
Pisto		Spain (Murcia)	Vegetarian	Stew made of tomatoes, onions, eggplant or courgettes, green and red peppers and olive oil.
Pörkölt		Hungary	Pork	Hungarian stew that consists of meat, paprika, and sometimes vegetables, but no potatoes. It should not be confused with goulash, which always contain potatoes and is more like a soup.
Pot-au-feu		France	Beef	French beef stew. Other ingredients may differ from region to region, but commonly various kinds of vegetables are included, such as carrots, turnips, leeks, celery and onions.
Potée Lorraine		France	Pork or ham	French one-pot stew of salt pork or ham with haricot beans and seasonal vegetables
Potjiekos		South Africa	Game	South African stew that is usually prepared outdoors. The recipe commonly contains meat, vegetables, starches like rice or potatoes, all slow-cooked with Dutch-Malay spices, the distinctive spicing of South Africa's early culinary melting pot. Other common ingredients include fruits and flour-based products like pasta.
Pottage		United Kingdom	Various	Thick soup or stew made by boiling vegetables, grains, and, if available, meat or fish. Pottage commonly consisted of various ingredients easily available to serfs and peasants, and could be kept over the fire for a period of days, during which time some of it was eaten and more ingredients added. The result was a dish that was slowly but constantly evolving, a "perpetual stew".
Pozole		Mexico	Pork or fowl	Mexican stew with ritual significance made from maize with meat, usually pork, chicken, turkey, or pork rinds, with chili peppers, and other seasonings and garnishes. Vegetarian and vegan versions also exist.
Puchero		South America; Spain	Veal	Stew whose ingredients may vary greatly according to region. Its equivalent may be the Spanish cocido.
Qoiri		Tibet	Lamb	Stew of mutton chops, made with flour, shredded wheat, chilli, dry curd cheese, water and salt.
Ragout		France	Various	Refers to a main-dish stew. Ragouts may be prepared with or without meat, a wide variety of vegetables may be incorporated, and they may be more or less heavily spiced and seasoned. Pictured is ragout with lentils.
Ratatouille		France (Provence)	Vegetarian	Vegetable stew from the Provence that consists mainly of tomatoes with garlic, onions, courgettes (zucchini), aubergine (eggplant), poivron (bell peppers), marjoram and basil, or bay leaf and thyme, or a mix of green herbs, such as herbes de Provence.
Red cooked pork		China; Taiwan	Pork	Braised stew made with soy sauce, Chinese rice wine, caramelized sugar, and spices. Usually made with pork, but other meats, such as beef or chicken are also cooked in this style.
Rendang		Indonesia	Beef	Spicy beef stew braised in a coconut milk and seasoned with a mixture of herbs and spices that has been slow cooked for usually four hours.
Rössypottu		Finland	Pork	Stew made using potatoes (pottu, peruna), some pork and the main ingredient, so-called "rössy" (i.e. blood pudding made of blood, beer, rye flour and some spices).
Rogan Josh		India	Lamb	Aromatic lamb stew native to the Indian subcontinent, which is one of the signature recipes of Kashmiri cuisine. Rogan josh consists of braised lamb chunks cooked with a gravy based on browned onions or shallots, yogurt, garlic, ginger and aromatic spices (cloves, bay leaves, cardamom and cinnamon).
Rubaboo		North America	Game	Basic stew or porridge consumed by coureurs des bois and voyageurs (fur traders), as well as Métis people from North America. Traditionally made of peas or corn, or both, with bear or pork grease, and a thickening agent of bread or flour.
Sagamite		North America	Offal	Native-American stew made from hominy or Indian corn. Additional ingredients may include vegetables, wild rice, brown sugar, animal fat, beans, smoked fish or animal brains.
Saksang		Indonesia	Pork	Spicy stew made from minced pork or dog meat (or more rarely, water buffalo meat) stewed in blood, coconut milk, and spices.
Saltah		Yemen	Lamb	Considered the national dish of Yemen, the base is a brown meat stew called maraq, with fenugreek froth and sahawiq or sahowqa, a mixture of chillies, tomatoes, garlic, and herbs ground into a salsa. Common additions are rice, potatoes, scrambled eggs, and vegetables.
Sambar		India	Lentils Meat	South Indian stew made with lentils, vegetables and tamarind pulp extract. Famously used as a side dish with idli, dosa, vada, pongal and plain cooked rice.
Sancocho		Colombia, Venezuela, Dominican Republic	Various	Meat, vegetables, root vegetables
Scouse		United Kingdom (England)	Beef	A slow cooked or beef stew with potatoes carrots and onions.
Seco		Ecuador	Lamb	Stewed meat.
Sekba		Indonesia	Offal	Chinese Indonesian pork offals stewed in mild soy sauce-based soup. The stew tastes mildly sweet and salty, made from soy sauce, garlic, and Chinese herbs.
Semur		Indonesia	Beef	Type of meat stew that is processed in thick brown gravy. The main material used in semur gravy is shallots, onions, garlic, kecap manis (sweet soy sauce), nutmeg, and cloves.
Shiro		Eritrea	Vegetarian	Homogeneous stew whose primary ingredient is powdered chickpeas or broad bean meal.
Sinigang		Philippines	Various	Filipino soup or stew characterized by its sour flavor most often associated with tamarind (sampalok).
Skirts and kidneys		Ireland	Pork & offal	Irish stew made from pork and pork kidneys.
Slavonian čobanac		Croatia	Beef, pork, game meat	Traditional meat stew originating from the Slavonia region of eastern Croatia.
Sonofabitch stew		United States (West)	Veal and offal	Cowboy dish consisting of whatever is on hand. Most recipes call for meat and offal from a calf.
Spanish fricco		Germany	Beef	A hearty Westphalian stew prepared primarily using diced beef, potatoes and onions, typically in a cream soup base.
Spezzatino		Italy	Beef	
Steak and kidney		United Kingdom	Beef and offal	Slowly braised beef, traditionally the less tender cuts, and diced ox kidney. Traditionally served with beef suet dumplings which are cooked in the stew.
Steckrübeneintopf		Germany		Stew based on rutabaga
Stew peas		Jamaica	Various	Jamaican stew prepared using coconut milk, gungo peas (pigeon peas) or red peas (kidney beans), uncured meats and salted meats such as pork and beef. Can also include onion, garlic, scallions, pig tail, herbs, and spices.
Stovies		Scottish	Meat	Potato stew made with leftover meat, onions and meat drippings
Stufato		Italy		
Sulu köfte		Turkey	Sausage	Soup-like stew with köfte meatballs in the dish.
Tagine		North Africa	Lamb	Berber dish from North Africa, named after the special earthenware pot in which it is cooked. It includes different ingredients according to region, but commonly several kinds of vegetables, meats and spices
Tas kebap		Turkey	Veal	Veal or mutton stew with potatoes
Tatws Pum Munud		United Kingdom (Wales)	Pork	Traditional Welsh stew, made with smoked bacon, stock, potatoes and other vegetables.
Tharid		Arab world	Lamb	Dish made from pieces of bread in a vegetable or meat broth. Pictured is lamb tharid.
Tocană		Romania	Vegetarian	Prepared with tomato, garlic and sweet paprika, it is traditionally consumed with a cornmeal mush called mămăligă.
Tomato bredie		South Africa	Lamb	South African stew with Dutch origin that usually features mutton, which is cooked for a very long time, and includes cinnamon, cardamom, ginger, cloves, and chili as seasonings.
Tombet		Spain (Mallorca)	Vegetarian	Traditional vegetable stew that contains layers of sliced potatoes, aubergines and red bell peppers previously fried in olive oil. The aubergines and red peppers should not be peeled. The whole is topped with tomato fried with garlic and parsley, and presented in a way that it looks like a pie without a crust.
Tuna pot		Spain, France (Basque)	Fish	Fish stew that was eaten on tuna fishing boats in the Cantabrian Sea. A simple dish with potatoes, onions, pimientos, and tomatoes.
Türlü		Turkey	Vegetarian	Stew of mixed vegetables stew which may also include meat. The dish is known as tourlou in Greece and as turli tava in North Macedonia
Wat		Ethiopia; Eritrea	Various	Stew or curry which may be prepared with meat, such as chicken, beef, or lamb, or a variety of vegetables, with spice mixtures, such as berbere and niter kibbeh, a seasoned clarified butter.
Waterblommetjiebredie		South Africa	Lamb	Meat, typically lamb, stewed together with waterblommetjies (Aponogeton distachyos flowers, commonly known as Cape pondweed, Cape hawthorn or Cape asparagus). Literally means "small water flower stew" in Afrikaans.
Waterzooi		Belgium (Flanders)	Fish	Stew made of fish or chicken, vegetables (carrots, leeks, and potatoes), herbs, eggs, cream, and butter.
Yahni		Greece Turkey Iran		
Zoervleis		Limburg region, Belgium& the Netherlands	Horse	Traditional dish similar to German sauerbraten which features meat (normally horse meat) that was marinated in vinegar or apple cider. Contrary to what one would expect, it is sweet, as it is served with gingerbread.

== See also ==
- Fish stew – includes a list of many fish stews
- List of Azerbaijani soups and stews
- List of fish and seafood soups
- List of Japanese soups and stews
- List of soups
- List of Spanish soups and stews
