= Giblets (disambiguation) =

Giblets may refer to:

- Giblets, the edible offal of a fowl
- Gibs, or giblets, gamer slang expression for the remnants of a kill
- Gibelet, a 13th-century Crusader holding, today known as Byblos
- Guelphs and Ghibellines, Crusader factions
