= Mulligan stew =

American stew

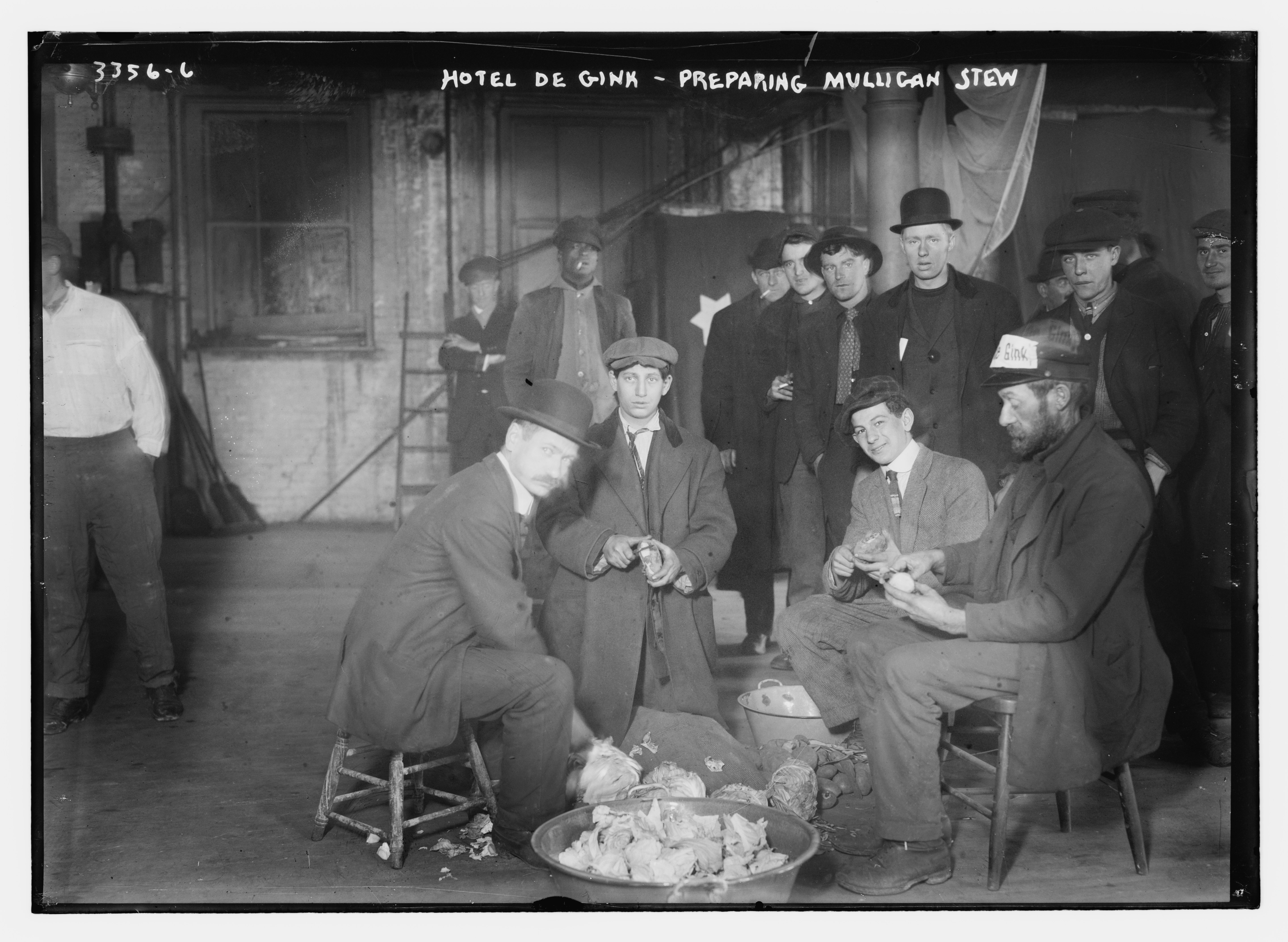
- Mulligan stew being prepared at the Hotel de Gink, c. 1910
- Type: Stew
- Place of origin: United States
- Main ingredients: Meat; potatoes; vegetables

Mulligan stew, also known as hobo stew, is a type of stew said to have been prepared by American hobos in camps in the early 1900s.

Another variation of mulligan stew is "community stew", a stew put together by several homeless people by combining whatever food they have or can collect. Community stews are often made at "hobo jungles", or at events designed to help homeless people.

== Description ==
Mulligan stew is broadly defined as a stew made of odds and ends or any available ingredients. A description of mulligan stew appeared in a 1900 newspaper:

Another traveler present described the operation of making a "mulligan." Five or six hobos join in this. One builds a fire and rustles a can. Another has to procure meat; another potatoes; one fellow pledges himself to obtain bread, and still another has to furnish onions, salt and pepper. If a chicken can be stolen, so much the better. The whole outfit is placed in the can and boiled until it is done. If one of the men is successful in procuring "Java," an oyster can is used for a coffee tank, and this is also put on the fire to boil. Incidentally, it may be mentioned that California hobos always put a "snipe" in their coffee, to give it that delicate amber color and to add to the aroma. "Snipe" is hobo for the butt end of a cigar that smokers throw down in the streets. All hobos have large quantities of snipes in their pockets, for both chewing and smoking purposes. A "beggar stew" is a "mulligan," without any meat.

== Ingredients ==
"Mulligan" is a stand-in term for any Irishman, and Mulligan stew is simply an Irish stew that includes meat, potatoes, vegetables, and whatever else can be begged, scavenged, found or stolen. A local Appalachian variant is a burgoo, which may comprise such available ingredients as possum or squirrel. Only a pot and a fire are required. The hobo who put it together was known as the "mulligan mixer."

During the Great Depression, homeless men (hobos) would sleep in a "hobo jungle" (a campsite used by the homeless near a railway). Traditionally, the jungle would have a large campfire and a pot into which each person would put in a portion of their food, to create a shared dish that was, hopefully, more tasteful and varied than his original portion. Usually, they would afterward enjoy themselves with story-telling and, sometimes, the drinking of alcohol.

== See also ==
- Booyah (stew), a social stew popular in parts of Minnesota and Wisconsin
- Brunswick stew
- Burgoo, often prepared communally
- List of stews
- Mulligatawny soup
- Stone soup, also known as button soup, wood soup, nail soup, and axe soup, often prepared communally
