= Alicto =

Alicto is a surname. Notable people with the surname include:

- Cora Alicto (born 1980), Guam sprinter
- Michael Alicto (born 1982), Guam sprinter

== See also ==
- Alicot
