= Buğu kebabı =

Lamb stew from the Turkish cuisine

Buğu kebabı (Turkish for vapour kebab) is a lamb-based dish from the Turkish cuisine. It is a stew, like tas kebabı. Buğu kebabı is made with leg meat, shallots, tomatoes, fresh oregano, garlic, bay leaves, tomato paste and spices. The essence of the dish is to cook it for one to one and a half hour in a covered pan on low heat with little (one cup) to no water.

Buğu kebabı is sometimes translated into English as 'steam kebab'. In the Turkish cuisine, there is an eggplant and meat stew/casserole called 'islim kebabı', (which is also translated as steam kebab or steamed kebab). Buğu kebabı should not be confused with either of these.

== See also ==
- List of stews
