= Chapea =

Bean stew from the Dominican Republic

- Type: Stew
- Place of origin: Dominican Republic
- Main ingredients: Red beans or white beans, longaniza, rice, plantain, squash

Chapea is a bean stew, a popular dish from the countryside of the Dominican Republic. Kidney beans or white beans with longaniza (sausage), rice, and green plantains are the basic ingredients, with other meats, vegetables and mashed squash used as a thickener. The flavor is distinguished by the herb cilantro and a dash of sour orange juice (naranja agria).

== See also ==
- Fabada asturiana
- Feijoada
- List of stews
