= Gink =

Gink may refer to:

- Boob Fowler (1900–1988), American Major League Baseball player
- Harvey Hendrick (1897–1941), American American Major League Baseball player
- Hotel de Gink, a series of self-service American hotels created by and for homeless men, starting in 1913
- Wink Gink, a short-lived advertising character for Wink (soft drink)
- "GINK" ("green inclinations, no kids"), a variation of DINK (acronym), people who choose not to have children for environmental reasons

== See also ==
- Captain Gincks (fl. 1705-1706), sometimes spelled Ginks, a privateer based in New York
