= Piattino =

Italian restaurant in Portland, Oregon, U.S.

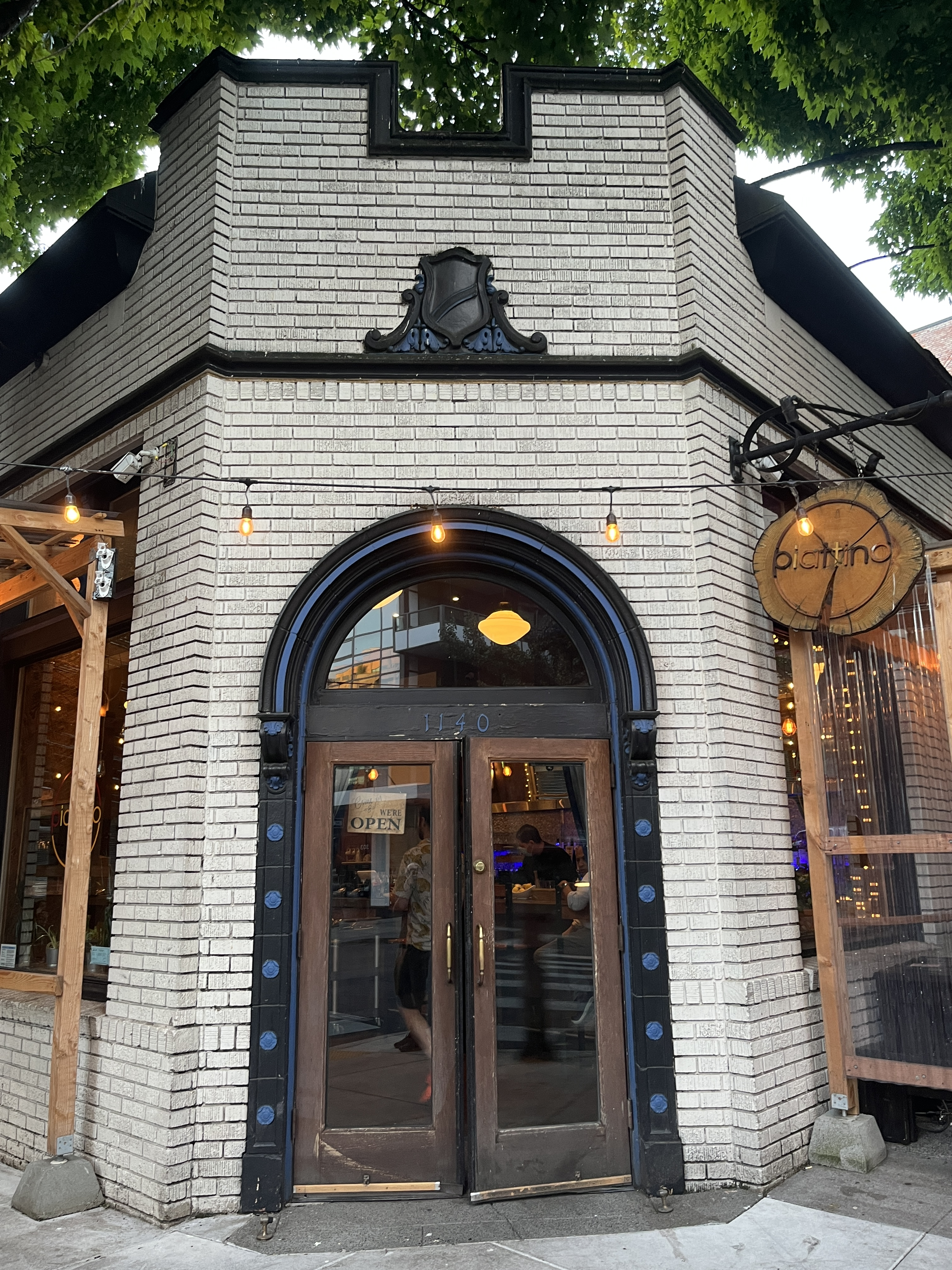
- Front entrance, 2022
- Interactive map of Piattino

Restaurant information
- Food type: Italian
- Location: 1140 Northwest Everett Street, Portland, Oregon, 97209, United States
- Coordinates: 45°31′30″N 122°40′59″W
- Website: piattinopdx.com

Piattino is an Italian restaurant in Portland, Oregon's Pearl District, in the United States.

== Description ==
Piattino is an Italian restaurant in the northwest Portland's Pearl District. According to Thrillist, the restaurant serves "Italian takes on tapas", wood-fired pizzas, desserts, and cocktails. The opening menu included 11 small plates (including mussels with tomatillo and cilantro, shellfish arancini with shrimp and lobster, and a half hen with peperonata, honey, and fennel pollen), a mushroom-and-salami calzone, and 5 pasta options including pork belly tortelli and fettuccine pimiento with wild boar ragu. The restaurant's seats 52 people, including 40 at wood tables, 6 at the oven counter, and 6 at the bar.

== History ==
Owner Kooroush Shearan opened Piattino in September 2013, replacing Mediterranean restaurant Shiraz Grill. Michael Campbell was the opening chef.

== See also ==
- List of Italian restaurants
