= Beaver stew =

Lithuanian stew

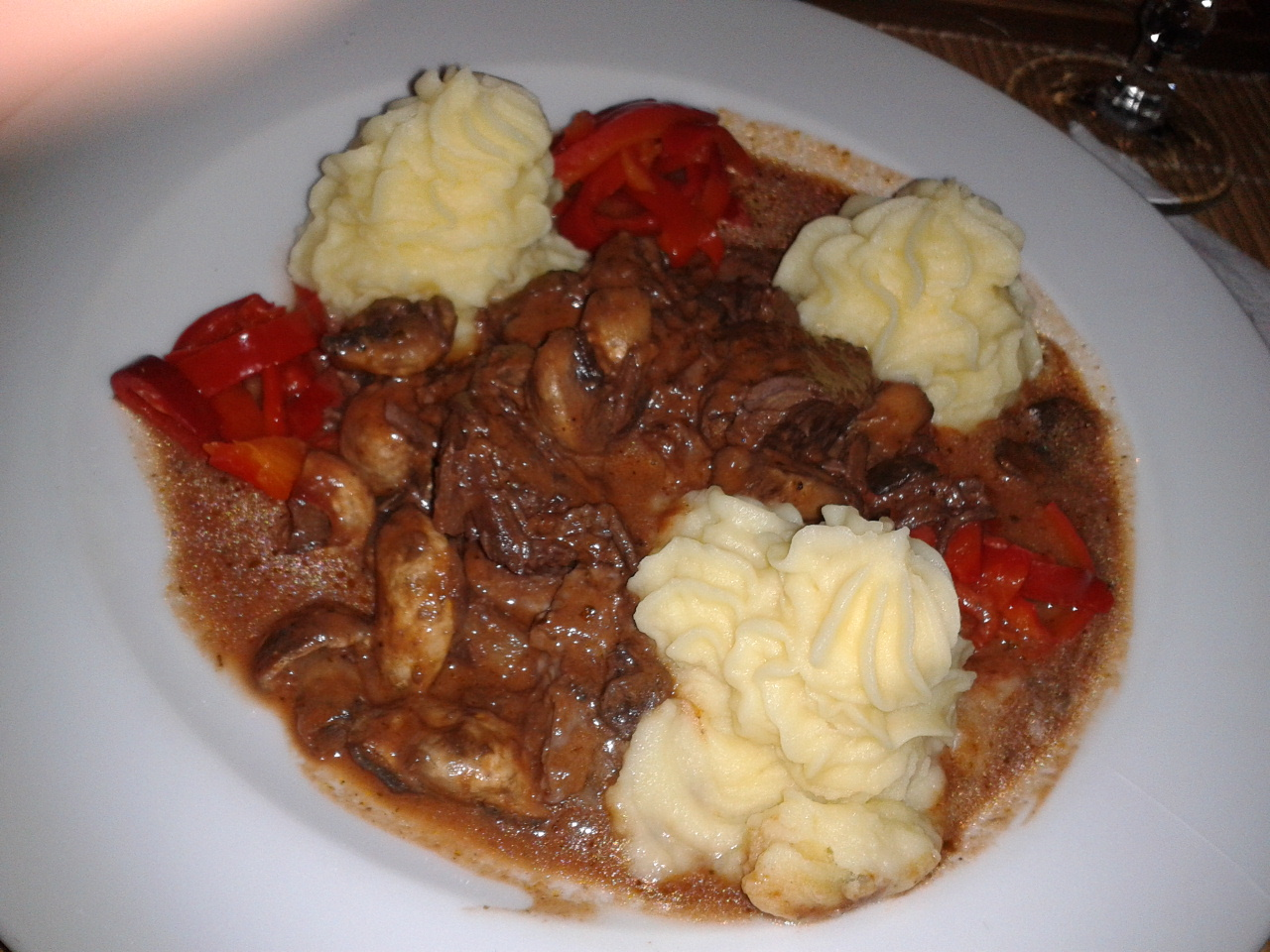
- Type: Stew
- Place of origin: Lithuania

Beaver stew (Lithuanian: bebrienos troškinys) is a traditional dish of Lithuanian cuisine.

As the name suggests, it a type of stew that is prepared with beaver meat, and is considered a game dish.

The meat is marinated for two days with juniper berries and other spices. It is then cooked with carrots, onions, flour, prunes, walnuts and mushrooms, among other possible ingredients.

Beaver stew is usually served with mashed potatoes and salad.

== See also ==
- List of stews
