= Crow stew =

Stew made from crow meat

- Type: Stew
- Main ingredients: Crow

Crow stew is a stew made primarily from the meat of a crow. Crow stew may include onion, bacon fat, flour and sour cream. According to Guy Chassagnard's Dictionary of French Cuisine, crow has "very tough meat", but can be "placed on the lid of a large cooking pot" to create "crow stew".

An early reference to crow stew in the United States appears in an account of Prince Achille Murat. While living in and around St. Augustine, Florida from 1821 to his death in 1847, Murat was known to prepare and enjoy "crow stew", which he "served to his dinner guests."

The modern, sour cream-based crow stew appears to have originated during the 1930s, at the time of the Great Depression. It appears in several publications at that time, including Nebraskaland (1933) and Outdoor Indiana (1936).

The restaurant Café Kör in Budapest, Hungary, has served crow stew.

== Other uses ==
The term crow stew is also sometimes used as a pun, referring to the idiom eating crow. In an April 4, 1982, Chicago Tribune article titled, “Money can put the Sox, Cubs on top”, the Chicago-based sports writer Dave Condon predicted that the Chicago Cubs baseball team would defy expectations and have a winning season. However, as the Cubs’ season neared the end, the team was 19 games behind the first-place Cardinals and was not expected to make the playoffs. As the Cubs prepared to host the rival Mets team, “Condon figured that the Mets would arrive in town with a menu for him of ‘crowburger, crow fricassee, crow pizza, crow stew, crow a la Gekas, and just plain crow for breakfast, lunch, and dinner.”

== See also ==
- List of stews
