= Spezzatino =

Italian meat-based stew

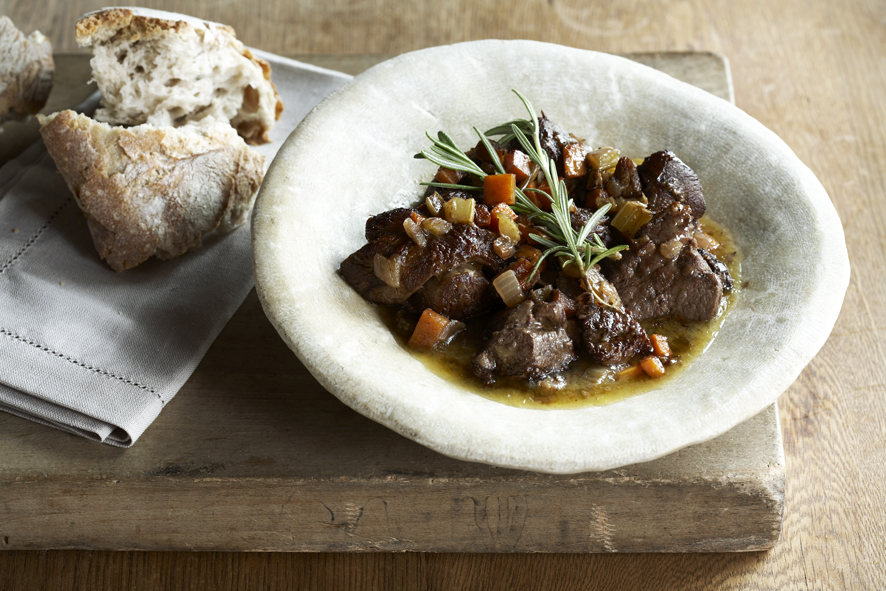
- Course: Secondo (Italian course)
- Place of origin: Italy

Spezzatino is an Italian stew made from low-grade cuts of veal, beef, lamb or pork. There are many regional variants; for example, in Tuscany is prepared a famous variant made with beef, carrots, celery and onions, in Umbria spezzatini di montone (mutton) and roe are traditional, and in Nuoro spezzatino di cinghiale, whereas in Friuli-Venezia Giulia spezzatino is served with aromatic herbs and dry white wine.

== See also ==
Media related to Spezzatino at Wikimedia Commons

- List of stews
