= Chicken mull =

American regional chicken stew

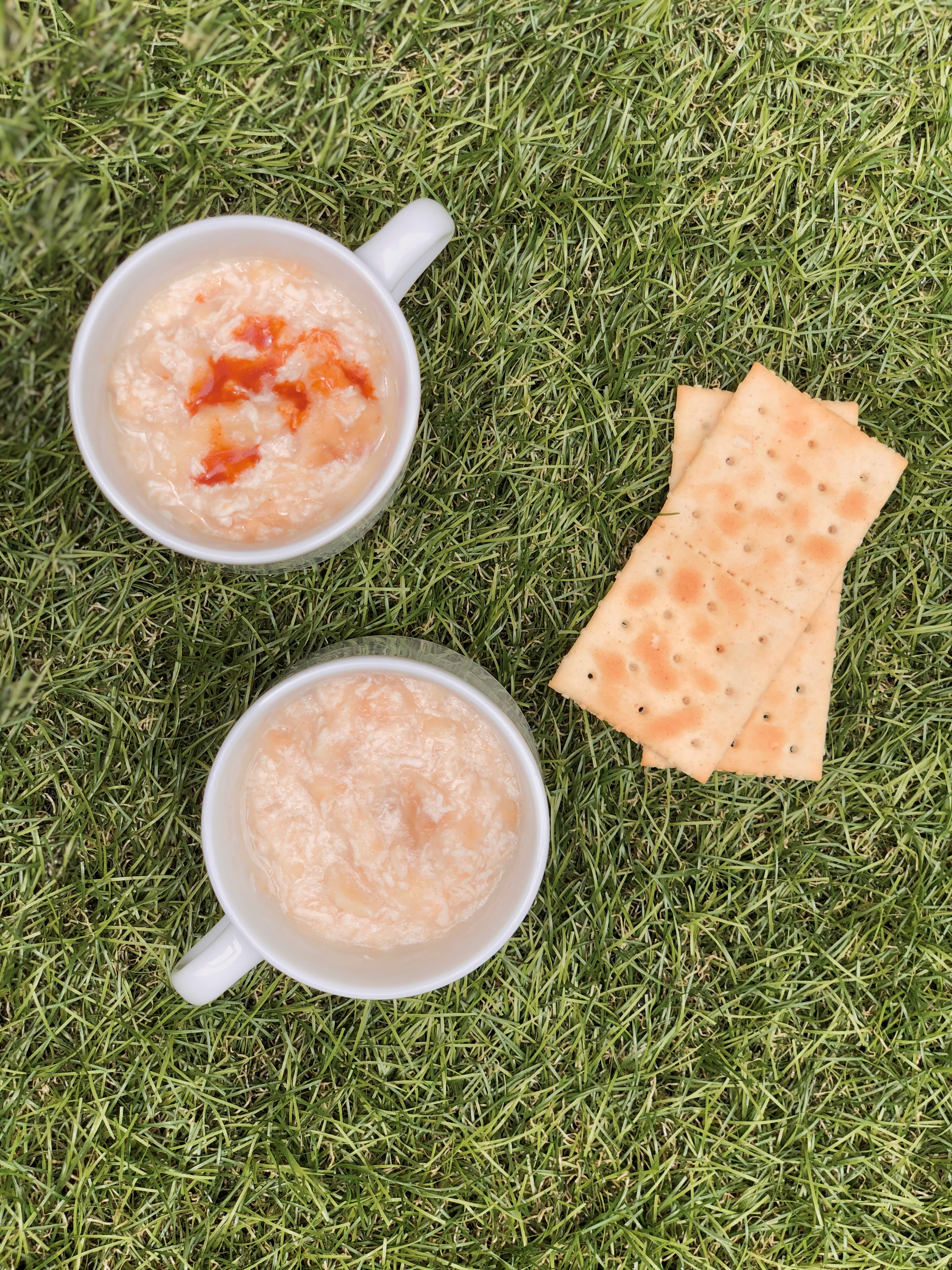
- Alternative names: Chicken mulligan
- Type: Stew
- Place of origin: United States
- Region or state: North Carolina, South Carolina and Georgia
- Main ingredients: Chicken, broth, (cream or milk), butter

Chicken mull is a traditional dish from North Carolina, upstate South Carolina, and Georgia. It is a type of stew consisting of parboiled whole chicken in a cream- or milk-based broth, butter, and seasoned with salt, pepper, and other ingredients. Traditionally, the stew is served in the late fall and winter months. In northern Georgia, this part of the year is often referred to as "mull season". Often, the term "chicken mull" refers to an event or gathering where the dish is served.

== History ==
The origins of chicken mull may rest in the coastal practice of Atlantic fishermen slow-cooking striped bass, called a "fish muddle". This tradition inspired inland communities to slow cook chicken using similar ingredients in what is sometimes called a chicken muddle or chicken mull. Some others have claimed that it was invented around Athens, Georgia, where it retains its popularity today.

== Preparation ==
Recipes for chicken mull vary slightly from person to person, but it is usually made by first cooking a whole chicken by boiling or parboiling, allowing a rich broth to form. The chicken is then removed from the pot and the skin, bones and fat are removed. A thickening of milk or cream is made and added to the broth. Several sleeves of saltine crackers can be crumbled into broth and chicken mixture as it is the more common method of thickening the mull.

The chicken is usually ground up in a meat grinder, although sometimes it is cut into small pieces. It is necessary to grind the meat in a traditional mull so that it is evenly distributed throughout the mixture. The chicken is then added back into the liquid along with salt, pepper and butter or margarine. Various other ingredients may be added to the stew according to local tradition, (such as diced potatoes or onions); a more common addition is varying amounts of hot sauce.

The stew varies in color from white to pale yellow, depending on the amount of butter or margarine used. It can vary in thickness from very thin and soup-like to thick and creamy. Saltine crackers are commonly served with chicken mull, either on the side or crumbled into the bowl. Other, nearly identical variations of a "mull" can be made using either catfish, oysters or canned salmon, instead of chicken. In the past, rabbit and turtle meat were also added to chicken mulls by some Southern cooks.

== Cultural traditions ==
Because of its low cost of preparation and reputation as a local comfort food, chicken mull is often served at large social gatherings such as church fellowships, family reunions and community fundraisers.

It is a tradition at these gatherings to prepare the mull in a large cast iron or stainless steel pot, often outdoors over an open fire. Bowls of mull are sometimes complemented with coleslaw, rice or grilled cheese sandwiches.

In North Carolina and Georgia, "chicken mulls" or "chicken stews" are social events usually held during the colder seasons, with most events occurring September through December.

== See also ==
- List of chicken dishes
- List of stews
