= Ostrich stew =

South African stew made with ostrich meat

Ostrich stew is a stew prepared using ostrich meat as a primary ingredient. It is a part of South African cuisine, and is served in many places and restaurants in Oudtshoorn, South Africa. The meat can be diced into cubes, and leg meat from the ostrich is sometimes used. Additional ingredients can include vegetables such as onion, celery, carrots, tomatoes, soup stock and wine.

== See also ==
- List of stews
