= Molagoottal =

South Indian stew

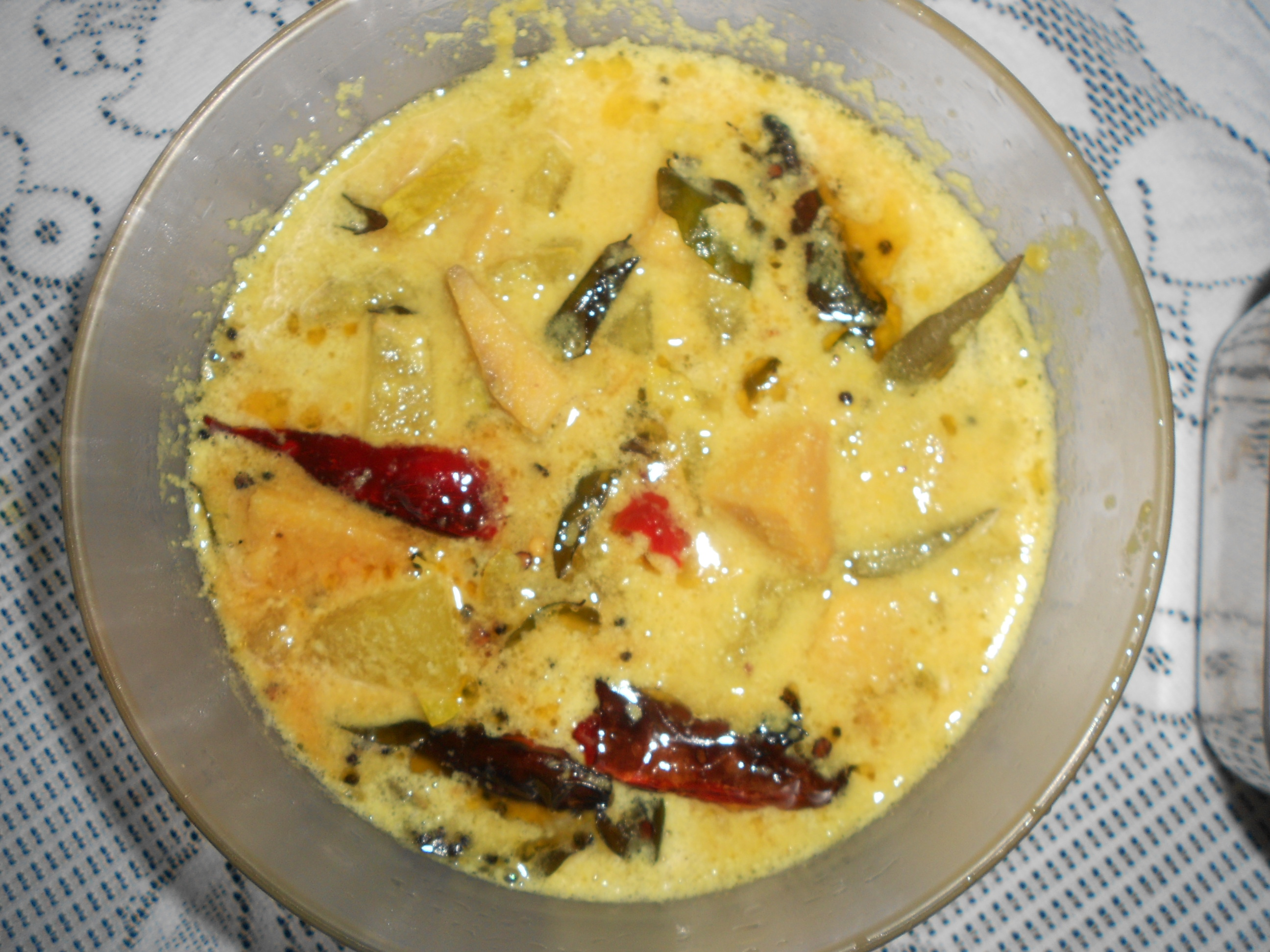
- Molagoottal made with yam, ash gourd and bottle gourd
- Alternative names: Molagootal, molakootal
- Type: Stew
- Place of origin: India
- Region or state: Palakkad, Kerala
- Serving temperature: Mixed with rice
- Main ingredients: Lentils (toor dal), coconut, cumin, vegetables

Molagoottal (Tamil: மொளகூட்டல்; Malayalam: മൊളഗൂട്ടല്) is a mild South Indian stew of lentils and ground coconut. It is a household dish of the Palakkad Iyers, the Tamil Brahmin community of the Palakkad region of Kerala, and is thick enough to serve when a plain rasam or sambar will not do. It is eaten mixed into rice with a spoon of ghee, and unlike sambar it contains no tamarind.

== Background ==
Molagoottal is believed to be the traditional food of Palakkad Iyers, who are traditionally vegetarians. Their cuisine is lentil-based, but when they settled in Kerala, they incorporated local produce such as coconut and pumpkin, and molagoottal emerged from that blend. The dish is common in homes across the region and is rarely sold in restaurants.

== Preparation ==
Toor dal, with a little moong dal, is steamed with the chosen vegetables. Grated coconut is ground with cumin and dried red chillies into a paste, which is added to the dal and vegetables with enough water to make a thick stew, and the pot is finished with a tempering of mustard seeds fried in coconut oil along with curry leaves. The heat comes from only a couple of chillies, so the stew is gentle rather than hot, and the absence of tamarind is what most sets it apart from sambar. A related Palakkad dish, molagushayam, shares the lentil-and-vegetable base but uses moong dal, takes its heat from black pepper, and has no coconut.

== Varieties ==
Molagoottal is made in many forms that differ only in the vegetable: cheerai, with spinach or other leafy greens; noolkol, with kohlrabi; and kalandha, a mixture of assorted vegetables such as carrot, beans and potato. For the spinach version, urad dal is fried with the red chillies and ground into the coconut paste.

== Serving ==
The stew is eaten mixed into rice with ghee. A Palakkad meal often pairs it with a vendakka pachadi, lady's finger in seasoned curd, and a thogayal, a dry chutney of coconut and tamarind, so that a tangy side sits against the mild stew; leftover molagoottal is also eaten with roti.

== See also ==
- Kerala cuisine
- Tamil cuisine
- Kootu
- List of stews
