= Collops =

Meat dish

A collop is a slice of meat, according to one definition in the Oxford English Dictionary. In Elizabethan times, "collops" came to refer specifically to slices of bacon. Shrove Monday, also known as Collop Monday, was traditionally the last day to cook and eat meat before Ash Wednesday, which was a non-meat day in the pre-Lenten season also known as Shrovetide. A traditional breakfast dish was collops of bacon topped with a fried egg.

== Etymology ==
The derivation is obscure; the OED cites that it may be related to the old Swedish word kollops (equivalent to the modern: kalops), but also suggests a German origin (Klops). The Swedish restaurateur Tore Wretman derives the modern Swedish kalops from the English collops, which in turn is said to originate from Swedish word colhoppe (ember-hops, from how the thin sliced strips of dried salted leg of mutton danced on the glowing hot skillet) that was well established in the Swedish language in the 15th century.

== History ==
Scotch collops are a traditional Scottish dish (referred to as a meal in Robert Louis Stevenson's novel Kidnapped—published in 1886; set in the 1750s). It can be created using either thin slices or minced meat of either beef, lamb or venison. This is combined with onion, salt, pepper and suet, then stewed, baked or roasted with optional flavourings according to the meat used. It is traditionally served garnished with thin toast and mashed potato.

A different recipe is found in the 18th-century The Compleat Housewife for thinly sliced veal "collops" dipped in seasoned batter and dredged in flour, fried in butter, and served with a thick mushroom butter gravy finished with freshly squeezed orange juice.

According to the early 19th-century cookery book A New System of Domestic Cookery by Maria Rundell, long thin slices of fat bacon are layered over veal collops, then spread with highly seasoned forcemeat, rolled, skewered, covered with egg wash and fried. These are served with brown gravy.

Several recipes for minced-beef collops are found in Eliza Acton's Modern Cookery for Private Families, the most simple made by mincing very tender beef and simmering the "collops" in their own gravy. Collops made with less tender cuts, like rump steak, are served in a stew made with a basic roux of flour and butter with herbs (called "brown thickening") and a flavoring ingredient like ketchup or chilli vinegar. A fancier version of this dish is made with cayenne, mace, mushroom ketchup and port wine, optionally served with gravy and currant jelly. Acton uses the term "collops" not only for recipes made with minced cuts of beef, but also in the meaning of "veal cutlets", small round cuts of veal either fried gently in clarified butter and served with espagnole sauce or, for the "Scotch collops", dipped in egg batter and bread crumbs and fried before saucing.

Lamb collops were included on the breakfast menu for first-class passengers of the Titanic in 1912.
