= Läskisoosi =

Traditional Finnish stew made with pork belly

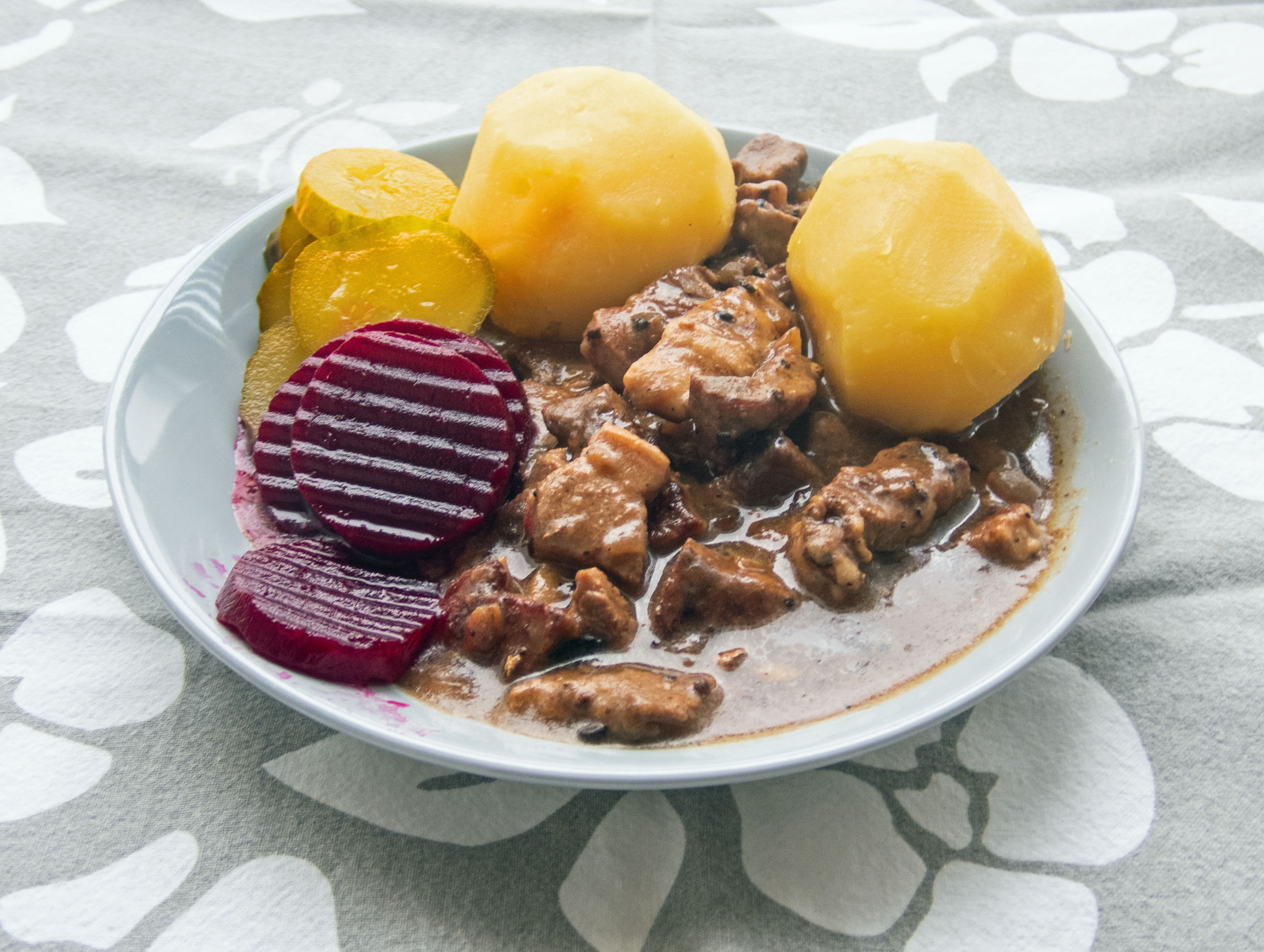
- Alternative names: Pork sauce
- Type: Stew
- Place of origin: Finland
- Main ingredients: Pork belly, butter, onions, flour, water, salt and pepper

Läskisoosi (officially sianlihakastike, English: Pork sauce) is traditional Finnish stew, made of pork belly fried in butter with onions and flour, stirred in water with salt and pepper. It is often served with mashed potato, pickled cucumber and lingonberry.

== See also ==
- List of stews
