= Hotel de Gink =

U.S. self-service homeless shelters

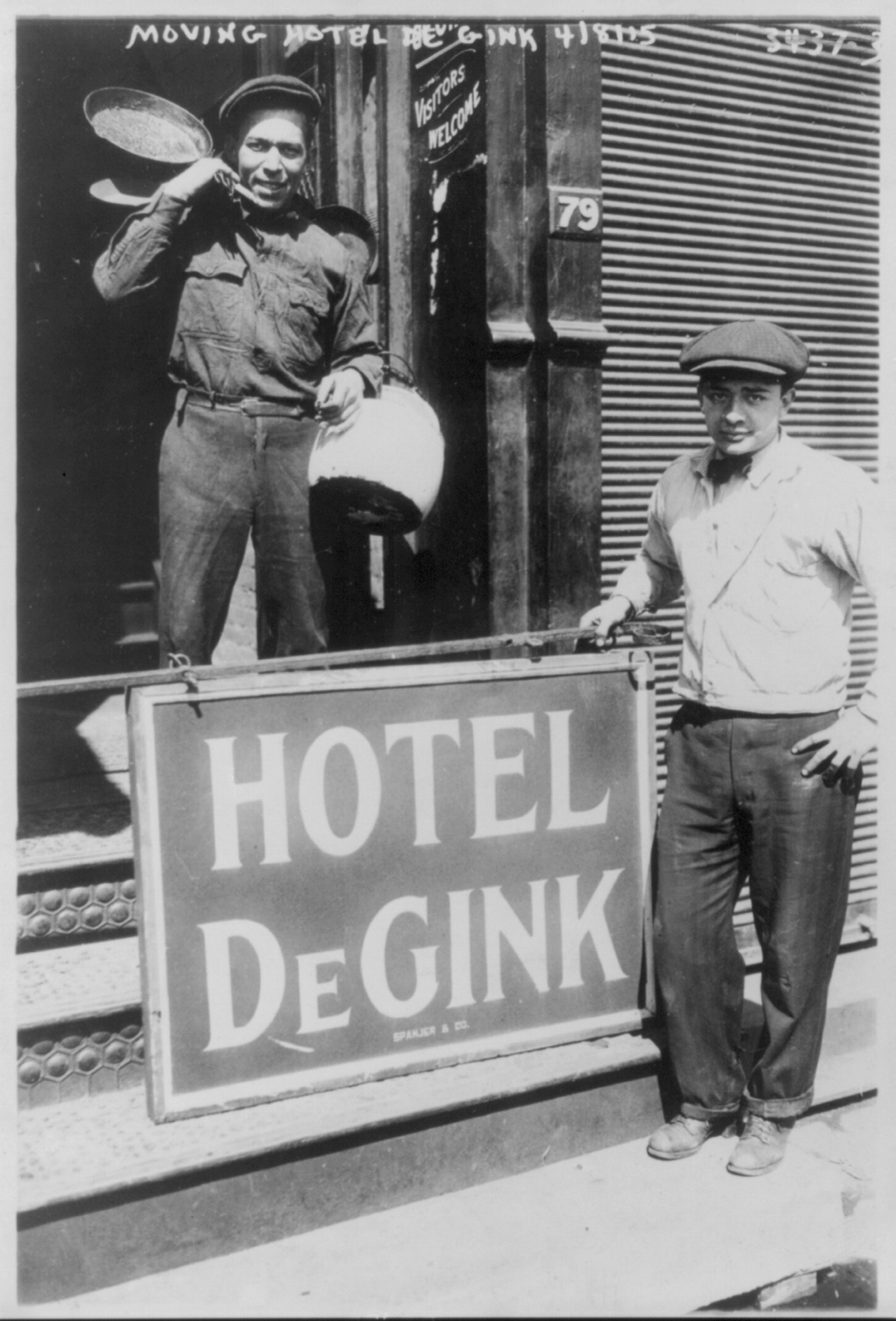
1915 photograph of Hotel De Gink

Hotel de Gink was a series of self-service hotels created by and for homeless men. Jeff Davis conceived the idea and founded the first Hotel de Gink in Seattle in 1913. The concept quickly spread across the country.

== Concept ==
Although the organization used the name "hotel" and was even a member of the International Hotel Alliance, in practice it was more like a homeless shelter. Hotels De Gink were self-supporting, as residents contributed whatever money they could to support hotel operations. The Hotels provided a range of services, including food, barbering, tailoring, and rudimentary medical care. All services were provided by residents, who were expected to volunteer at the Hotel for at least two days per week in exchange for lodging. The facilities were self-governing, with a group of residents deciding which applicants to admit.

Residents slept on the floor on donated blankets. Local restaurants donated kitchen supplies and other businesses provided other large pieces of equipment necessary for daily operations. Upkeep and maintenance were provided by residents.

== History ==
The United States experienced a recession starting in 1913. Productions and real income declined during this period and were not offset until the start of World War I increased demand. During this time, there were high periods of unemployment and homelessness. The Hotel de Gink existed to provide relief in these circumstances.

=== Jeff Davis ===
Jeff Davis was a man from Cincinnati called "the king of the hobos" and manager of the hotel. He believed in fostering self-sufficiency among the homeless. He founded a "hobo cabaret" of homeless people with musical talent.

=== Hotel de Gink ===
Davis spread the model to other cities. Davis opened branches in Tacoma, Washington, and Portland, Oregon. Late in 1914, he approached the New York City government with an offer to open a new facility to accommodate the city's growing homeless population.

The New York City Hotel opened with an over-the-top gala on January 21, 1915. Davis, dubbed "King Jeff" for the night, was seated in a throne adorned with cabbage, carrot, onion and potato, an homage to mulligan stew. The facility was only open during the winter. The New York branch closed shortly before America's entrance into the First World War.

The Buffalo, NY location was opened in 1925 by then Mayor Frank X. Schwab. It closed in 1929 at the end of his term.

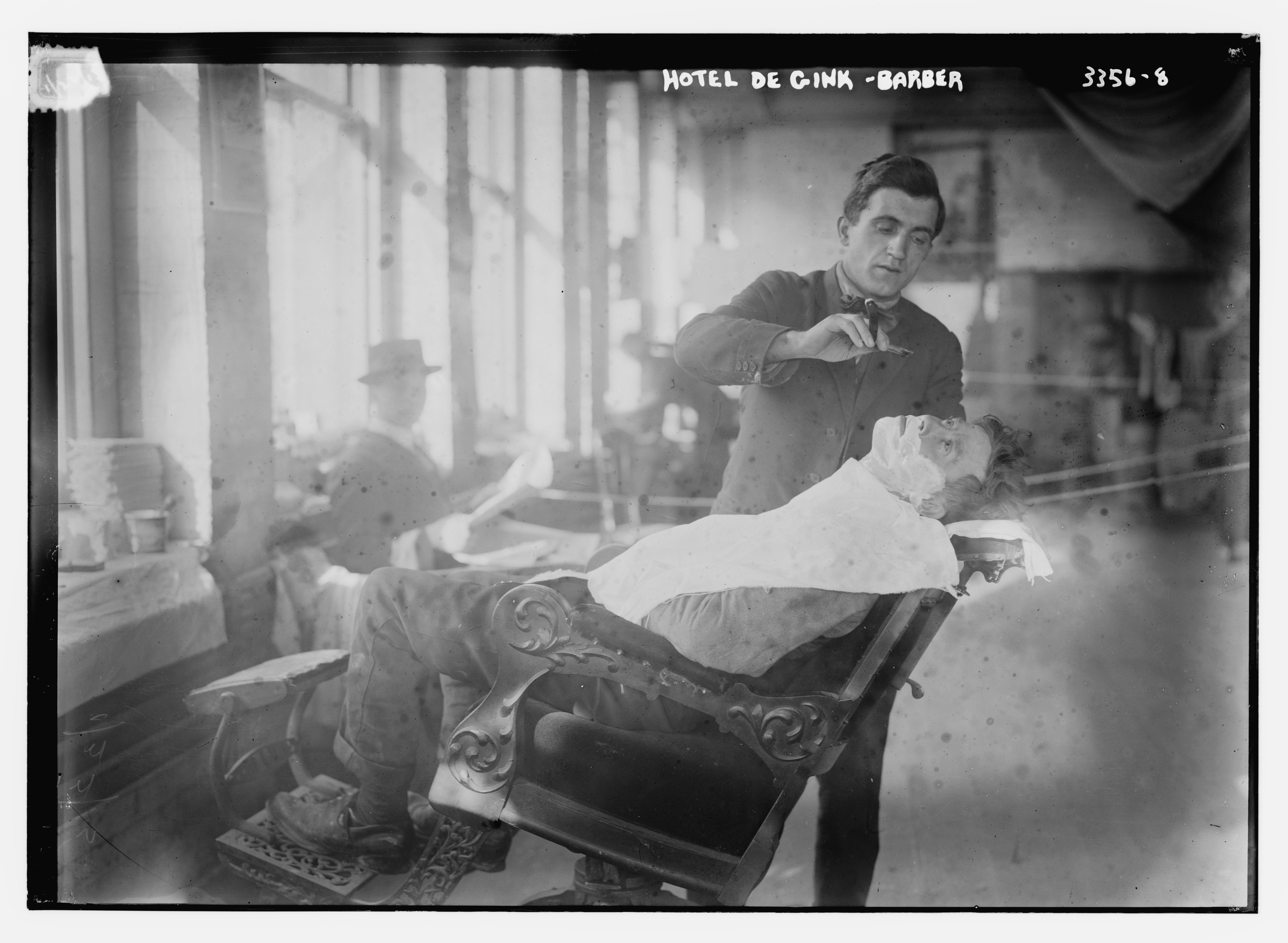
A barber at the Hotel de Gink in New York City

== Legacy ==
Although none of the Hotels are still in operation, the legacy survives. The term "Hotel de Gink" became slang for a short term less-than-desirable housing situation and the United States armed forces informally adopted the name Hotel De Gink for transient officer housing. Hotel de Gink was also featured in popular culture. In a larger sense, the Hotels proved the concept of self-service homeless services operated and maintained by residents.
