= Kalops (cuisine) =

Beef stew of Sweden and Finland

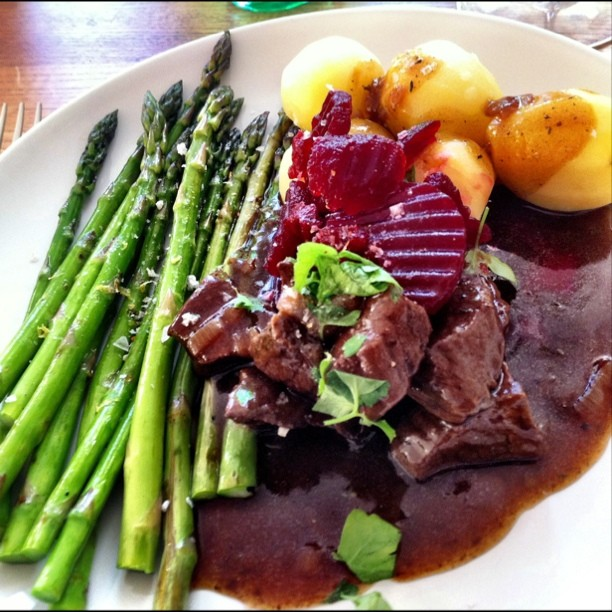
Kalops with boiled potatoes, asparagus and pickled beetroot.

Kalops (swe.) or palapaisti/vatkuli (fin.) or klops (est.) is a Swedish, Finnish and Estonian beef stew that contains beef, onion, allspice, bay leaf, and other spices. It is often served with boiled potatoes and pickled beetroot.

It was first described in a cookbook from 1755 by Cajsa Warg. The Swedish and Estonian name of the dish is derived from the English word "collops", which means 'slices of meat'.
