= Tas kebab =

Middle Eastern veal or mutton stew

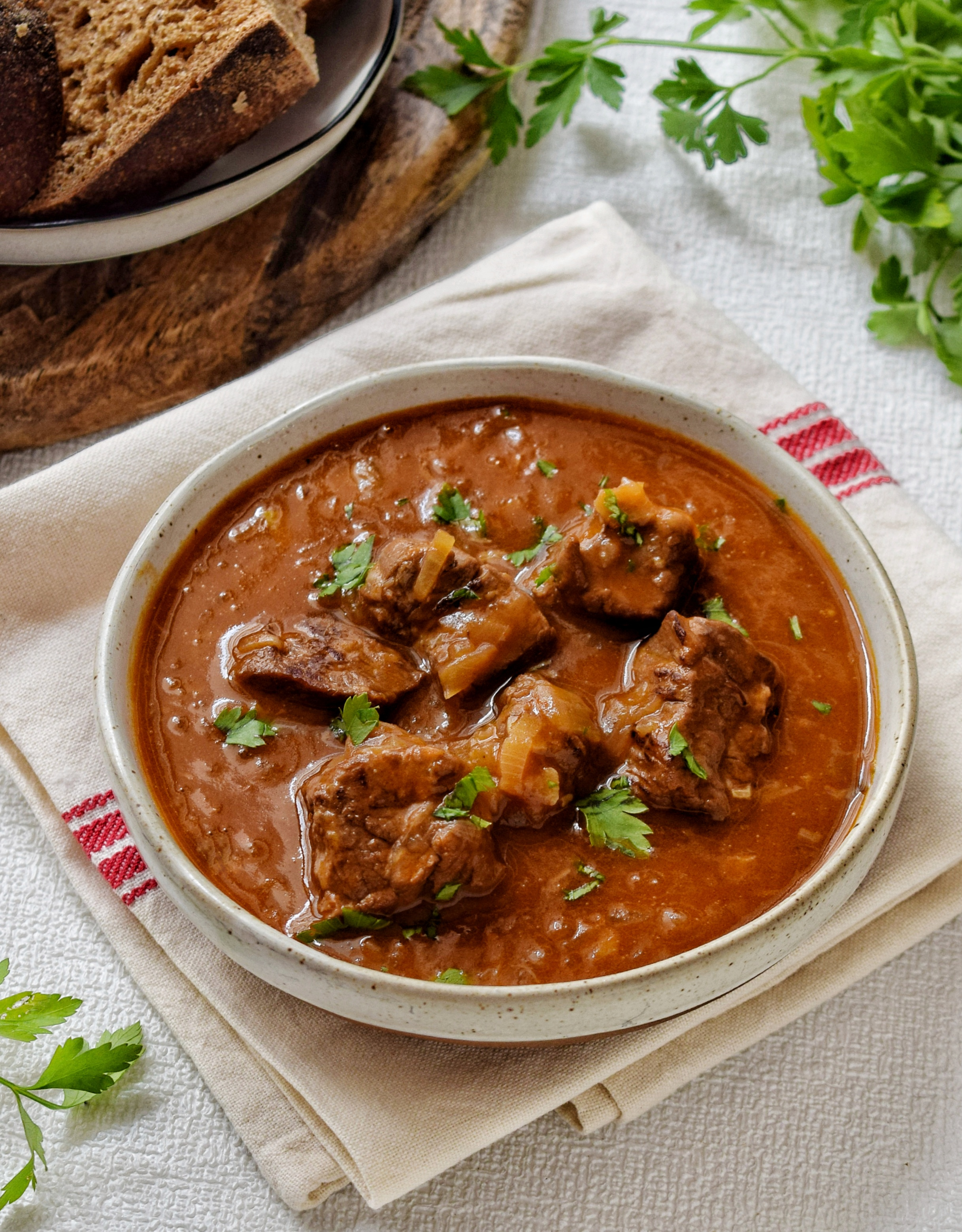
Tas kebap on a plate

Tas kebab (Persian: تاس کباب, Turkish: tas kebap or tas kebabı) is Middle Eastern meat stew. It is also used in the Balkans, with a different cooking method. It may be made with veal or mutton.

== See also ==
- List of stews
