= Brunswick stew =

American stew

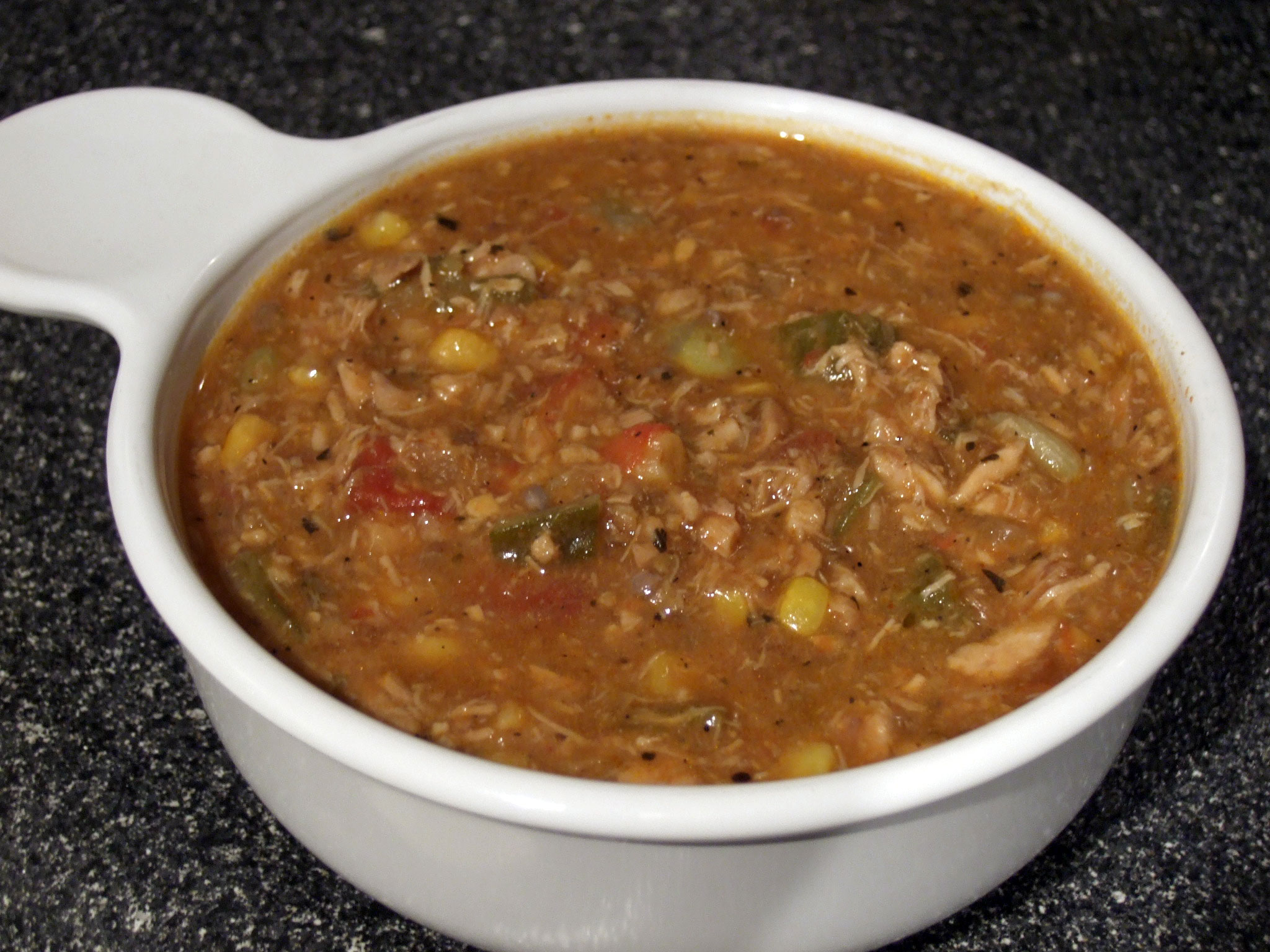
- Brunswick stew made with chicken
- Type: Stew
- Place of origin: Southern United States
- Main ingredients: Tomatoes, lima beans, corn, okra, other vegetables, meat

Brunswick stew is a tomato-based stew generally involving local beans, vegetables, and originally small game meat such as squirrel or rabbit, though today often chicken. The exact origin of the stew is disputed. The states of Virginia and Georgia both claim its birth, with Brunswick County in Virginia and the city of Brunswick in Georgia claiming it was developed there. It may have originated earlier in some form in the city of Braunschweig (Brunswick) in the Duchy of Brunswick-Lüneburg in today's northern Germany.

== Ingredients ==
Recipes for Brunswick stew vary greatly, but it is usually a tomato-based stew, containing various types of lima beans (butter beans), corn, okra, and other vegetables, and one or more types of meat. Originally it was small game, such as squirrel, rabbit or opossum meat, but chicken has become most common.

Chicken and rabbit are more common in Virginia, while pork is more common in Georgia.

Squirrel Brunswick stew instructions are found in James Beard's American Cookery.

Modern versions, particularly those in Georgia and the broader South, often include a mixture of meats such as pork and chicken, and sometimes incorporate beef.

== Origin ==
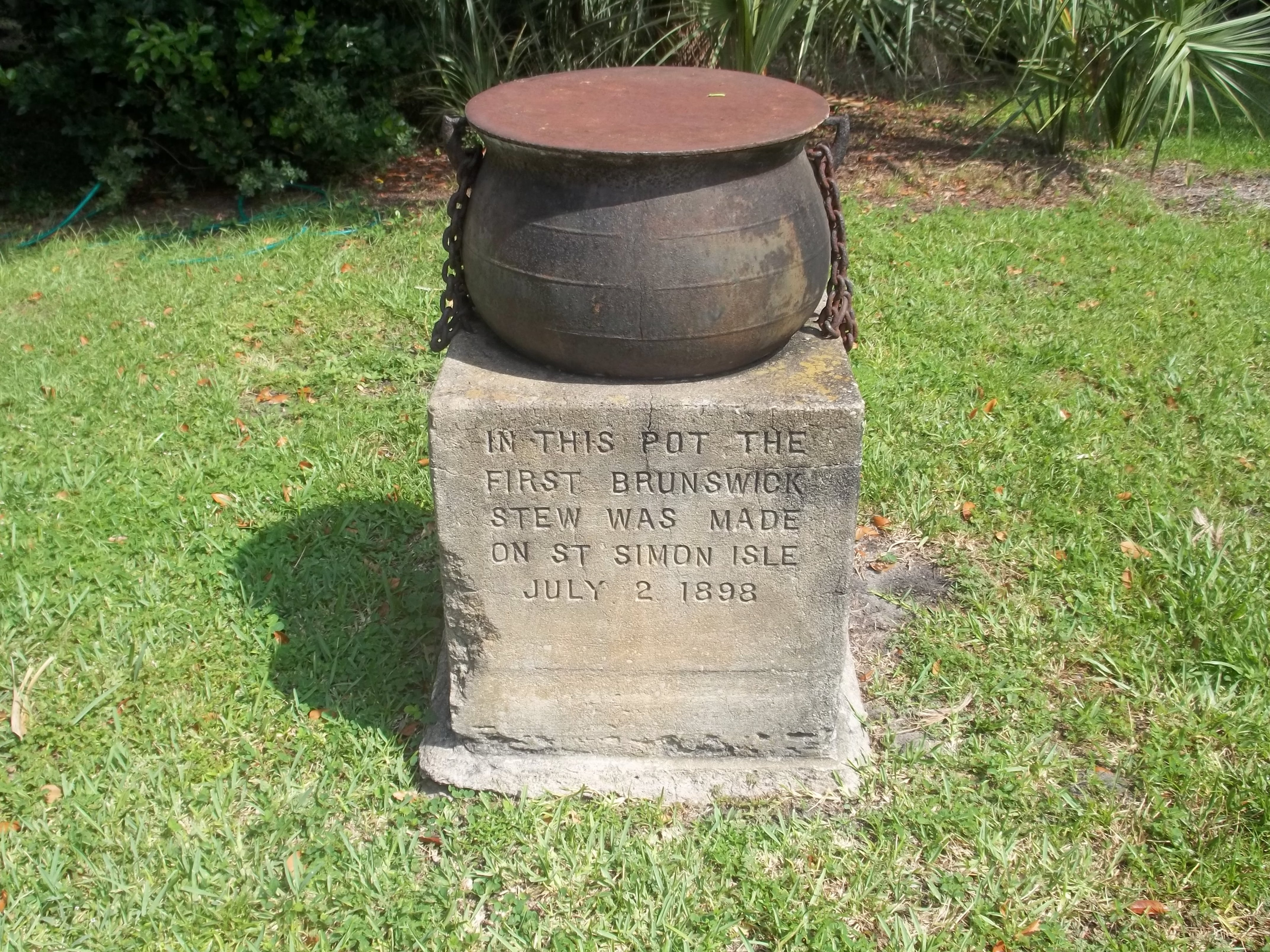
The original Brunswick Stewpot in front of the Farmers Market pavilion in Brunswick, Georgia

The stew's specific origin is unknown. Brunswick County, Virginia, and the city of Brunswick, Georgia, both named after the German Duchy of Brunswick-Lüneburg, then home to the House of Hanover, which also held the British Crown, claim to have created it.

A plaque on an old iron pot in Brunswick, Georgia, says the first Brunswick stew was made in it on July 2, 1898, on nearby St. Simons Island. A competing story claims a Virginia state legislator's chef invented the recipe in 1828 on a hunting expedition. Neither claim traces to the origin of those regions.

Marjorie Kinnan Rawlings, in her Cross Creek Cookery (1942), wrote that the stew, said to have been one of Queen Victoria's favorites, may have come from Braunschweig, Germany, one of the historic capitals of the Duchy of Brunswick-Lüneburg and traditionally known as "Brunswick" in British English.

According to the Virginia Writers Project's guide to Virginia, published in 1941, the stew originated in Brunswick County, Virginia:

Native to this county is Brunswick Stew, a flavorous brew first concocted by a group of hunters. One of the party, who had been detailed to stay in the camp as a cook, lazily threw all the supplies into a pot, it is said, and cooked the mixture over a slow fire. When his companions returned, cold and exhausted, they found the concoction a most appetizing dish. The time-honored directions for making this luscious meal are: boil about 9 pounds of game—squirrels are preferred—in 2 gallons of water until tender; add to the rich stock 6 pounds of tomatoes, 1 pound of butter-beans, 6 slices of bacon, 1 red pepper, salt to taste; cook 6 hours and add 6 ears of corn cut from the cob; boil for 8 minutes.

== See also ==
- List of stews
