= Fasole cu cârnați =

Romanian dish

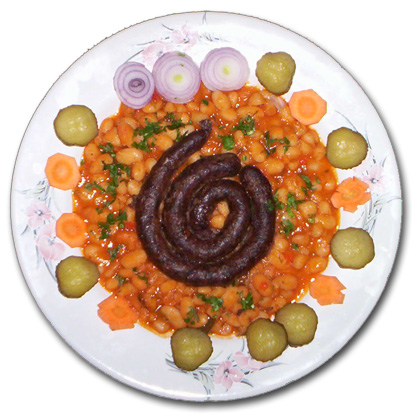
- Fasole cu cârnați
- Course: Main course
- Place of origin: Romania
- Serving temperature: Hot
- Main ingredients: Sausages, beans, tomato sauce, tomatoes, carrots, onions, parsnip, bay leaves

Fasole cu cârnați ("beans with sausages", Romanian pronunciation: [faˈsole ku kɨrˈnat͡sʲ]) is a popular Romanian dish, consisting of baked beans and sausages. A variation replaces the sausages with afumătură (smoked meat).

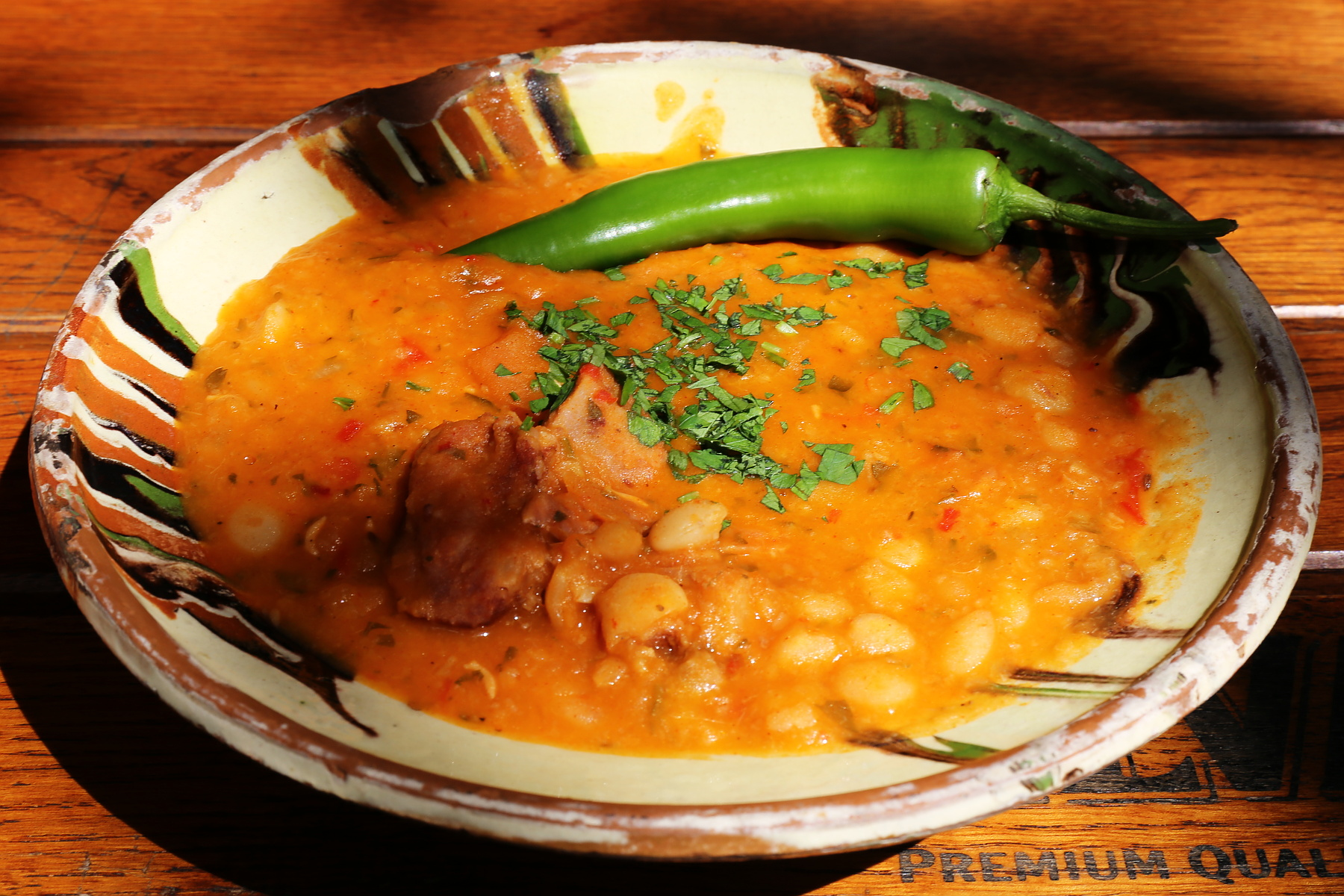
Beans with smoked meat

Also a traditional Army dish, fasole cu cârnați is prepared by Army cooks and served freely to the crowds during the National Day celebrations (on 1 December) in Bucharest and Alba Iulia. The main ingredients for this dish are: beans, smoked pork, carrots, onions, tomatoes, parsnip, tomato sauce and bay leaf.

== See also ==
- List of sausage dishes
- List of stews
