= Peperonata =

Italian vegetable stew

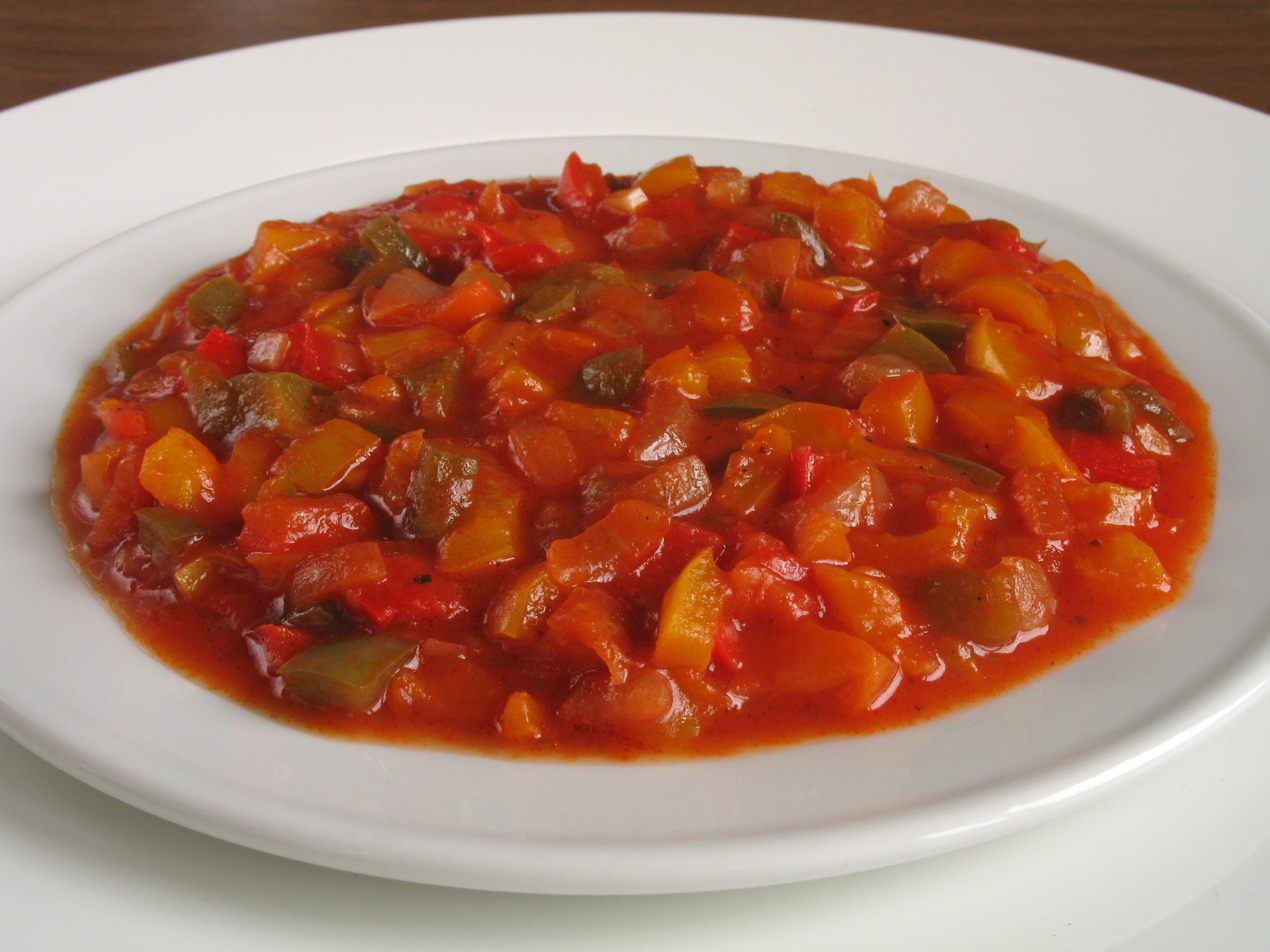
- Type: Stew
- Course: Contorno
- Place of origin: Italy
- Main ingredients: Bell peppers, tomatoes, onion

Peperonata is an Italian vegetable stew typically composed of red bell peppers, tomatoes, and onion. It may be used as a sauce for pasta or served as a side dish to meat and fish dishes. It may also be included as part of a ragù. A Maltese version uses roasted peppers preserved in oil and vinegar.

== See also ==
- List of stews
