= Alicot =

Dish made with poultry parts that is originally from southern France

- Type: Stew
- Place of origin: France
- Region or state: South-west
- Main ingredients: Poultry giblets

An alicot, otherwise known as an alicuit or ragout d'abattis is a southern French stew made of the cheapest parts of poultry, slowly simmered.

== Etymology and origin ==
The first two forms of the name derive from ali, ailes – wings and cuit, cuites – cooked. Variants are alycot and alycuit. The third form, ragout d'abattis, means giblet stew.

The dish is associated with the southern French region of Occitania: Larousse Gastronomique classifies the dish as Languedoc cuisine. It is also associated with the Aveyron department of the region, and other areas in the south-west of France.

== Content ==
The main ingredients are usually the heads, feet, wing tips, gizzards, and giblets of poultry – variously chicken, duck, geese or turkey. White wine, onions, tomatoes, garlic and diced bacon are included in most recipes, but there are variants: Elizabeth David gives a recipe in which the poultry content is confined to the giblets; salt pork or gammon is added; and another authority includes cèpes and chestnuts. Oher recipes call variously for poultry stock, flour, carrots, turnips and various spices including cloves, cinnamon and nutmeg.

The ingredients are gently simmered, usually for two to three hours. The finished dish is typically served with white haricot beans, potatoes, or rice.

== Sources ==
- Claustres, Francine (1995). Connaître la cuisine landaise. Bordeaux: Éd. Sud-Ouest. ISBN 978-2-87-901197-4.
- Claustres, Francine (1998). Connaître la cuisine aveyronnaise. Bordeaux: Éd. Sud-Ouest. ISBN 978-2-87-901162-2.
- Claustres, Francine (2010). Connaître la cuisine des Pyrénées. Bordeaux: Éd. Sud-Ouest. ISBN 978-2-81-770008-3.
- David, Elizabeth (2008) [1960]. French Provincial Cooking. London: Folio Society. OCLC 809349711.
- Montagné, Prosper (1976). Larousse Gastronomique. London: Hamlyn. ISBN 978-0-600-02352-4. OCLC 1285641881.
- Roberts, Deborah (1990). French Country Living. Boston: Bulfinch Press. ISBN 978-0-82-121826-6.
- Schwabe, Calvin (1979). Unmentionable Cuisine. Charlottesville: University Press of Virginia. ISBN 978-0-81-390811-3.
- Sharman, Fay (1989). A-Z gastronomique. London: Papermac. ISBN 978-0-33-349815-6.
