= Giblets =

Fowl offal

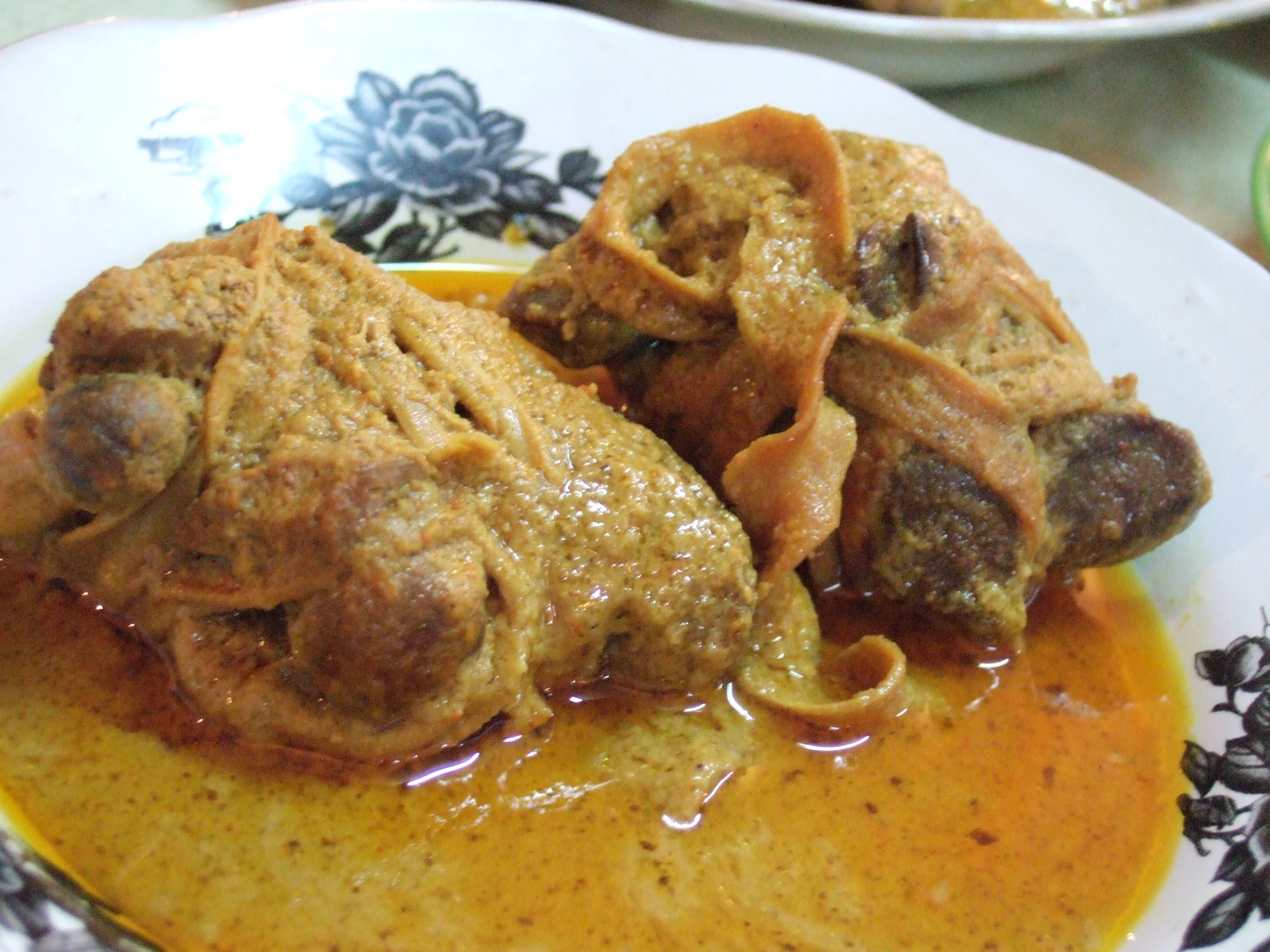
Chicken giblet, here the gizzard, liver and heart are wrapped in intestine, shown in a gulai (Nusantara-style curry) in Minangkabau cuisine, Indonesia

Giblets /ˈdʒɪblɪts/ are a culinary term for the edible offal of a fowl, typically including the heart, gizzard, liver, and other organs, though the exact composition varies and may also include parts such as the neck.

A whole bird from a butcher is often packaged with the giblets, sometimes sealed in a bag within the body cavity. In many countries, giblets are removed during processing and sold separately.

== Etymology ==
The term "giblet" is traced from Old French gibelet, that means a stew or ragout of game. The modern usage of the plural form developed later to refer to edible poultry offal that is cut out before cooking.

== History ==
In his 19th-century culinary dictionary, Alexandre Dumas defines giblets as "the comb and kidneys of the rooster, the wing tips of hens, the spinal marrow, gizzard, and neck of the turkey, calves' sweetbreads and brains". They can be made as a standalone dish with beef marrow bouillon, mushrooms, artichoke, truffles (when in season) and celery. This giblet dish can be served as a casserole with rice, or used as a filling for the pastry vol-au-vent. This was considered daily fare, and not intended for special occasions.

== Culture ==
There are a number of recipes that use giblets. If a bird is to be stuffed, the giblets are traditionally chopped and added to the stuffing; however, the USDA recommends cooking giblets separately from the rest of the bird. If not, they can be used for other purposes, such as giblet pie or, a Southern U.S. favorite, giblet gravy. With the exception of giblet gravy, the liver is not usually included in these recipes, as its strong flavor tends to overpower other ingredients. It may be used in liver-specific recipes, such as pâté or yakitori. Giblets can also be used to make alicot, a French stew.

In Turkish cuisine, iç pilav is a traditional pilaf dish, made with rice, chicken liver, nuts, and spices. Jerusalem mixed grill is an Israeli delicacy made with giblets, usually eaten with pita bread.

In Gorkha cuisine, giblets are cooked with chili pepper and tomato and relished as a side dish or appetizer known as karchi marchi.

Giblets are common in Taiwanese cuisine.

Most poultry, especially those sold in supermarkets, is not sold with the giblets included. Giblets can be bought separately from a butcher, but the demand for human consumption is low in most Western countries, so they are more often sold to pet food manufacturers.
