= Mediterranean cuisine =

Culinary traditions of the Mediterranean basin

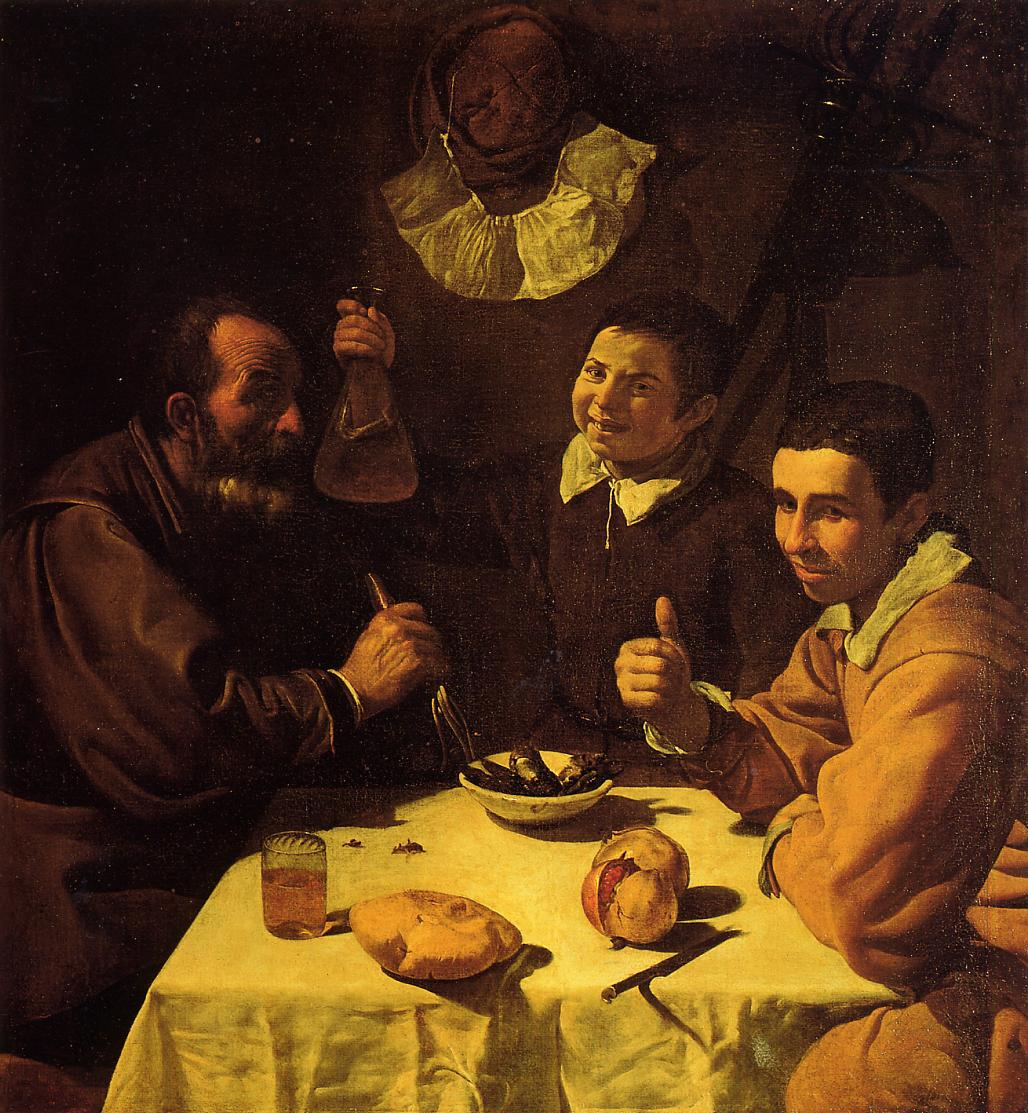
Bread, wine, and fruit: The Lunch by Diego Velázquez, c. 1617

Mediterranean cuisine is the food and methods of preparation used by the people of the Mediterranean basin. The idea of a Mediterranean cuisine originates with the cookery writer Elizabeth David's A Book of Mediterranean Food (1950), and was amplified by other writers working in English.

Many writers define the three core elements of the cuisine as the olive, wheat, and the grape, yielding olive oil, bread and pasta, and wine; other writers deny that the widely varied foods of the Mediterranean basin constitute a cuisine at all. A common definition of the geographical area covered, proposed by David, follows the distribution of the olive tree.

The region spans a wide variety of cultures with distinct cuisines, in particular (going anticlockwise around the region) the Moroccan, Algerian, Tunisian, Libyan, Egyptian, Levantine, Ottoman (Turkish), Greek, Italian, French (Provençal), and Spanish, although some authors include additional cuisines. Portuguese cuisine, in particular, is partly Mediterranean in character.

The historical connections of the region, as well as the impact of the Mediterranean Sea on the region's climate and economy, mean that these cuisines share dishes beyond the core trio of oil, bread, and wine, such as roast lamb or mutton, meat stews with vegetables and tomato (for example, Spanish andrajos), vegetable stews (Provençal ratatouille, Spanish pisto, Italian ciambotta), and the salted cured fish roe, bottarga, found across the region. Spirits based on anise are drunk in many countries around the Mediterranean.

The cooking of the area is not to be confused with the Mediterranean diet, made popular because of the apparent health benefits of a diet rich in olive oil, wheat and other grains, fruits, vegetables, and a certain amount of seafood, but low in meat and dairy products. Mediterranean cuisine encompasses the ways that these and other ingredients, including meat, are dealt with in the kitchen, whether they are health-giving or not.

== Geography ==
Elizabeth David defines the Mediterranean region as that of the olive, Olea europaea.

Various authors have defined the scope of Mediterranean cooking either by geography or by its core ingredients. Elizabeth David, in A Book of Mediterranean Food (1950), defines her scope as "the cooking of the Mediterranean shores" and sketches out the geographical limits:

from Gibraltar to the Bosphorus, down the Rhone Valley, through the great seaports of Marseille, Barcelona, and Genoa, across to Tunis and Alexandria, embracing all the Mediterranean islands, Corsica, Sicily, Sardinia, Crete, the Cyclades, Cyprus (where the Byzantine influence begins to be felt), to the mainland of Greece and the much disputed territories of Syria, the Lebanon, Constantinople, and Smyrna.

Despite this definition, David's book focuses largely on Spain, France, Italy, and Greece.

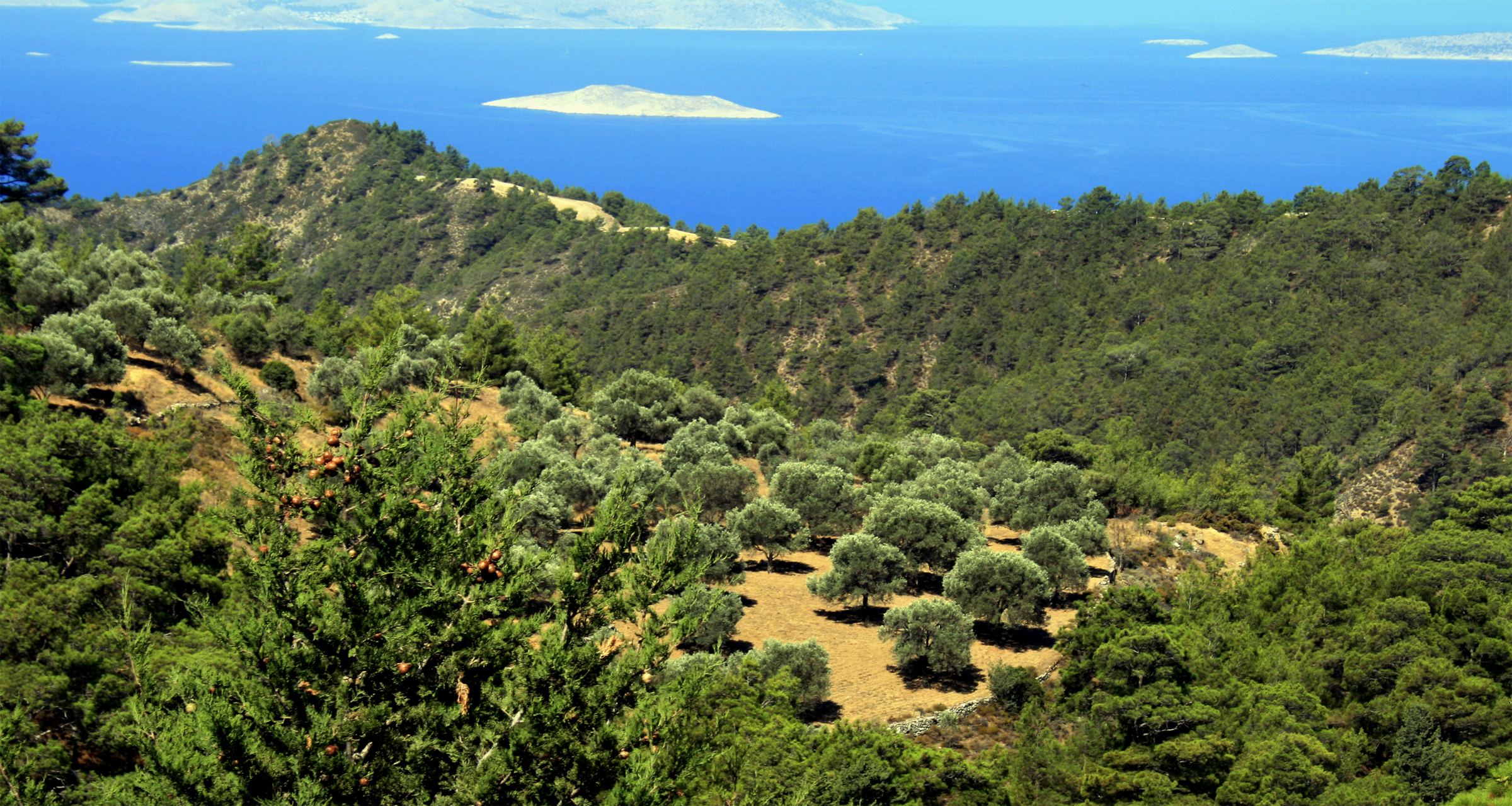
"Those blessed lands of sun and sea and olive trees": a landscape in Rhodes, in the Eastern Mediterranean

She defines this region as coextensive with the range of the olive tree: "those blessed lands of sun and sea and olive trees." The olive's natural distribution is limited by frost and by availability of water. It is therefore constrained to a more or less narrow zone around the Mediterranean Sea, except in the Maghreb and in the Iberian Peninsula, where it is distributed more widely, and on the islands of the Mediterranean, where it is widespread.

The Tunisian historian Mohamed Yassine Essid similarly defines the region by the olive's presence, along with bread, wheat, and the grape as the "basic products of Mediterranean folk cuisine":

Mediterranean cuisine is defined by the presence of fundamental elements which are said to play a more important role than others, reflecting a community of beliefs and practices which transcend religions, languages and even societies. The olive tree, the emblematic tree on more than one account, traces the bounds of a frontier of landscapes and lives on either side of which the Mediterranean begins or ends. Above Montelimar, nicknamed "Gates of Provence", is the limit of the olive.

Other authors question that there is any such common core:

The belief in a common core, emerging from a claim to authority over that kernel of "Mediterranean-ness", is what underlies writing describing the culinary Mediterranean, yet it seems that only from far away does a unified Mediterranean exist. The closer one gets to that common core, the less it is visible, until the food of Umbria comes to seem entirely different from the food of Tuscany, and to compare either to the food of Greece would be absurd. The very idea of a Mediterranean ensemble—be it onions and olive oil and tomatoes or some other combination entirely—presupposes not only a shared history but a unified history, an imagined moment in which the Mediterranean presented a single culture that over time has, like a language, split and branched and flowered into the wild variety of contemporary cuisine.

Some writers include the cuisines of the eastern Adriatic coast of Dalmatia—Albanian, Montenegrin, and Croatian, while most do not mention them. Some writers also include areas not touching the Mediterranean Sea or supporting olive cultivation, including Serbian, Macedonian, and Portuguese cuisine.

== Key ingredients ==
Essid identifies the "trinity" of basic ingredients of traditional Mediterranean cuisine as the olive, wheat, and the grape, yielding oil, bread, and wine respectively. The archaeologist Colin Renfrew calls this the "Mediterranean triad".

=== Olive ===
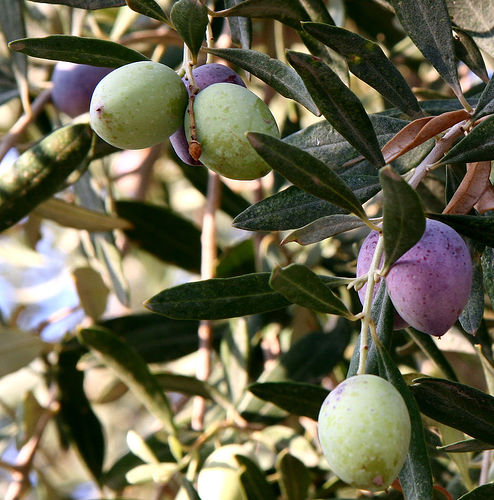
Olive (Olea europaea)

The olive appears to come from the region of Persia and Mesopotamia, at least 6,000 years ago. It spread from there to nearby areas, and has been cultivated since the early Bronze Age (up to 3,150 BC) in southern Turkey, the Levant, and Crete. The ten countries with the largest harvests (in 2011) are all near the Mediterranean (Portugal being the tenth largest): together, they produce 95% of the world's olives.

The olive yields bitter fruits, made edible by curing and fermentation, and olive oil. Some 90% of the fruit production (1996) goes into olive oil. The Mediterranean region accounts for the world's highest consumption of olive oil: in 2014, the highest-consuming country, Greece, used 17 kg (Note: A kilogram is about 2.2 pounds in weight.) per head; Italy, 12 kg, Spain, 13 kg; the United States for comparison used only 1 kg per head.

=== Wheat ===
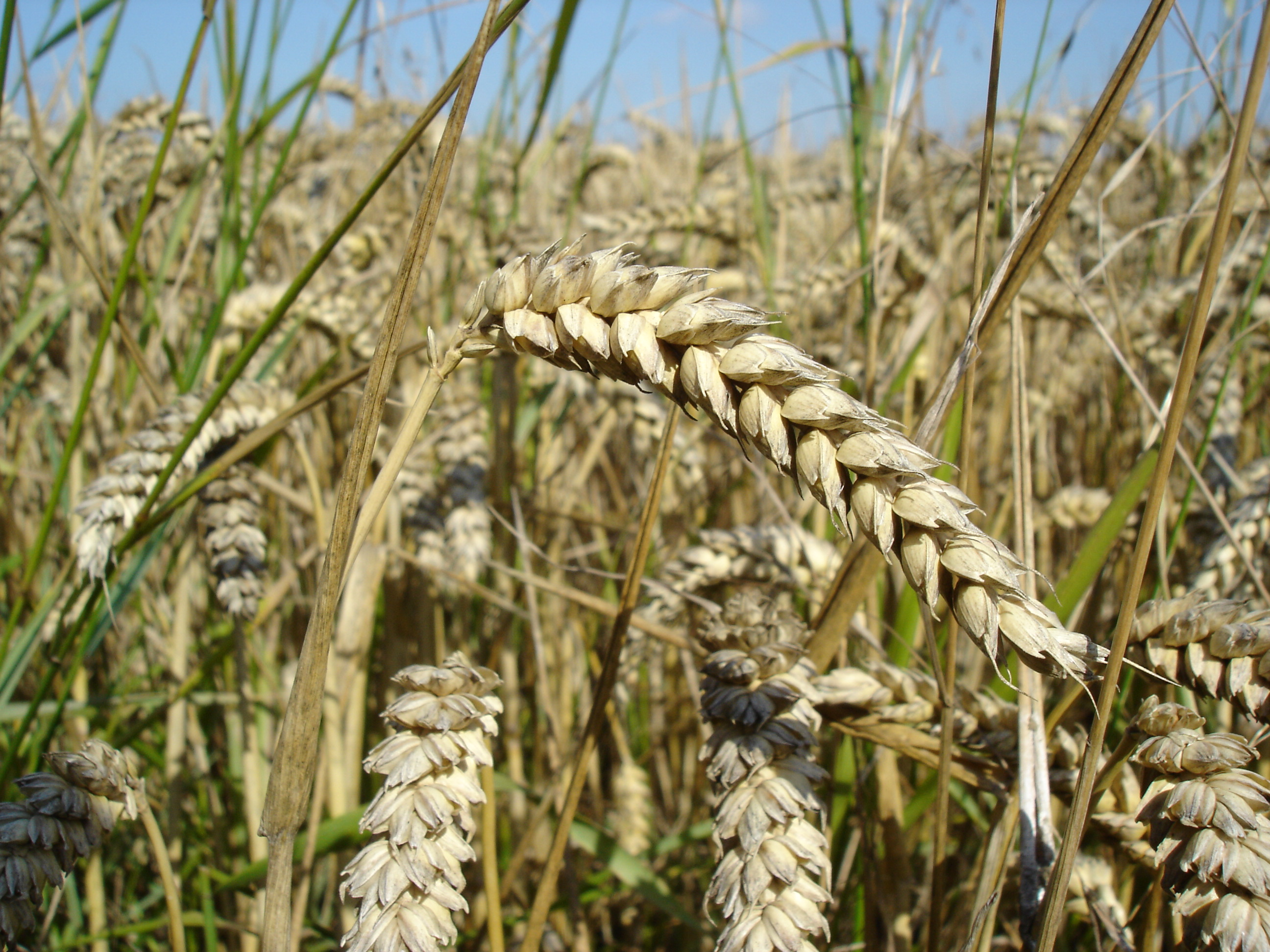
Wheat (Triticum)

Wheat was domesticated in the Fertile Crescent, in and near the Levant some 10,000 years ago. Its ancestors include wild emmer wheat; this was hybridised, harvested and sown to create domestic strains with larger grains, in ears that shatter less readily than wild forms. It was spread across the Mediterranean region as far as Spain by 5,000 BC.

Wheat is a staple food in the Mediterranean region. Wheat bread was already critically important in the empire of ancient Rome, which included the entire region; at that time, around 2,000 years ago, North Africa was the "breadbasket" of the empire. Other staple wheat-based Mediterranean foods include pasta and semolina (wheat middlings) products such as couscous and bulgur. In turn, these are made into dishes such as the Greek dessert galaktoboureko (milk börek), consisting of filo pastry parcels around a custard made with semolina. A widespread wheat dish from Turkey and the Levant to Iran and India is halva, a dessert of sweetened semolina with butter, milk, and pine kernels.

=== Grape ===
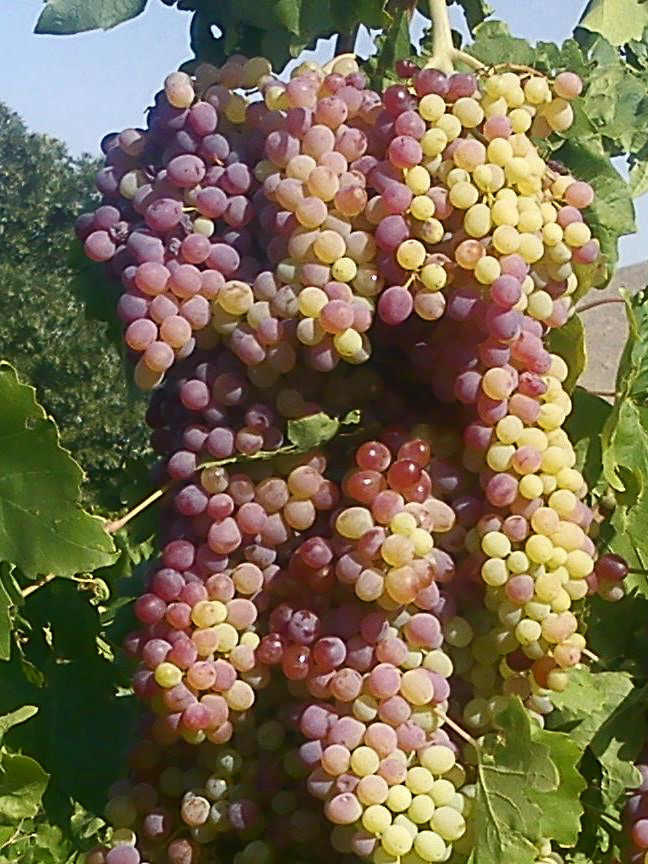
Grape (Vitis vinifera)

The grape was domesticated between 7,000 and 4,000 BC between the Black Sea and Persia; archaeological evidence shows that wine was being made there by 6,000 BC, reaching Greece and Crete in the fifth millennium BC and Spain by the last millennium BC. Winemaking started in Italy in the ninth century BC, and in France around 600 BC.

Grapes are mostly grown for making wine and vinegar as basic components of the Mediterranean diet, as well for drying as raisins or for eating as table grapes. Raisins and table grape varieties are chosen for their flavour.

== History ==
=== Concept ===
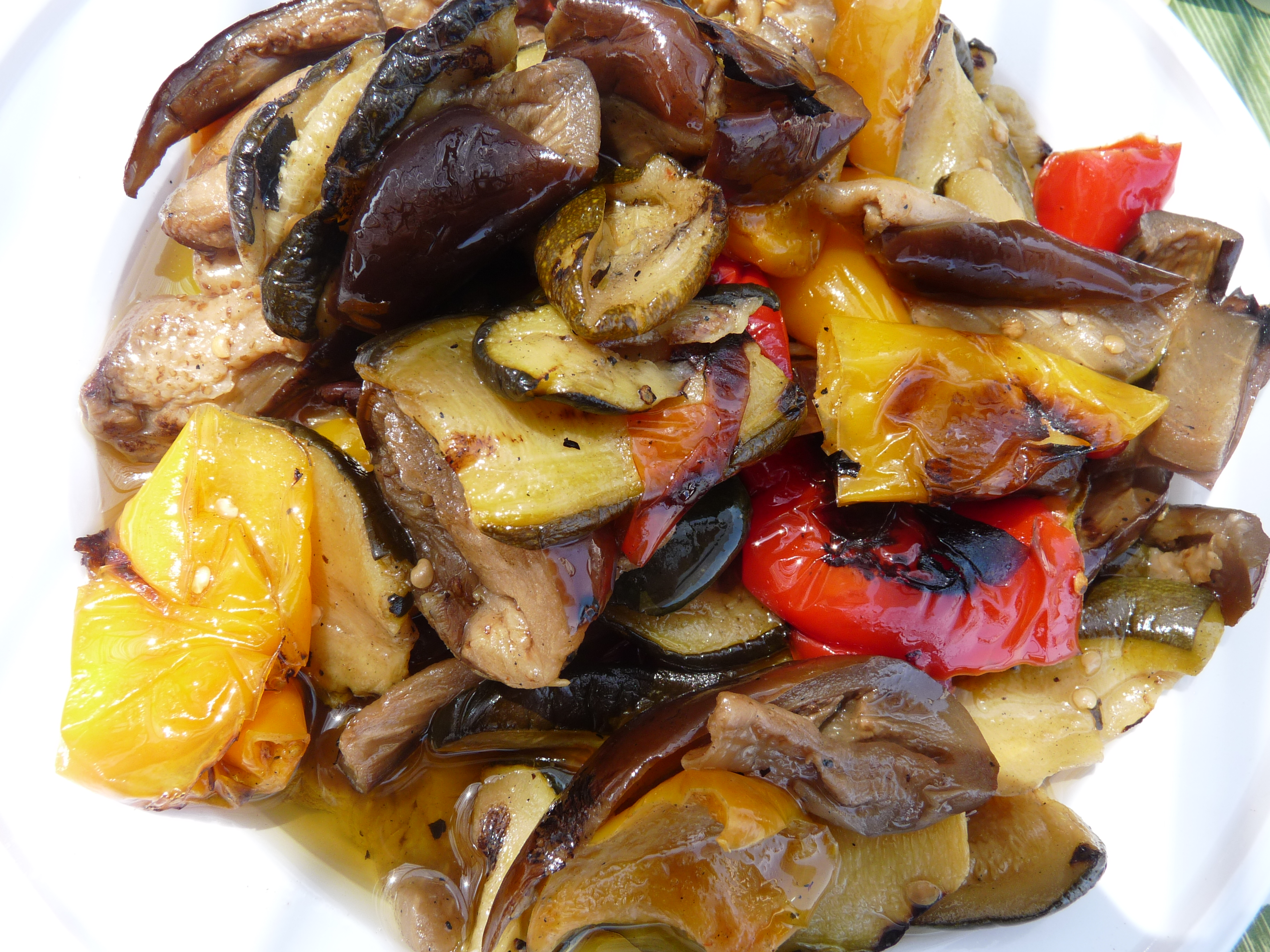
A dish of roast aubergines and peppers (often called by its Provençal name, ratatouille, in English), as interpreted on the Aeolian Islands

The concept of a Mediterranean cuisine is very recent, probably dating from the publication of David's A Book of Mediterranean Food (1950). David herself did not use the term, speaking instead of Mediterranean "food", "cookery", or "cooking". The usefulness of the concept is disputed. Carol Helstosky, author of the book Food Culture in the Mediterranean (2009), is among the authors who use "Mediterranean cuisine" interchangeably with "Mediterranean food". In the preface to her book she writes:

Mediterranean food is incredibly popular: pasta, pizza, sausage, wine, gyros, (Note: The Greek version of döner, meat roasted on a vertical spit.) kebab, and falafel can be found just about everywhere. Food experts and cookbook authors adore Mediterranean cuisine ...

Essid acknowledges that "geographical differences and the vicissitudes of history" have affected the food of different Mediterranean lands, but nonetheless asserts that:

Rules for the preparation and consumption of food are common to the lands that border the Mediterranean. They offer both stability, continuity and reproduction of a specific pattern of eating which resists conquest, invasion, colonisation, social change, industrialisation and urbanisation. Consequently, wherever you go, in Southern Europe or the lands bordering the Southern Mediterranean, you will find a cuisine and gastronomic ritual which is always familiar.

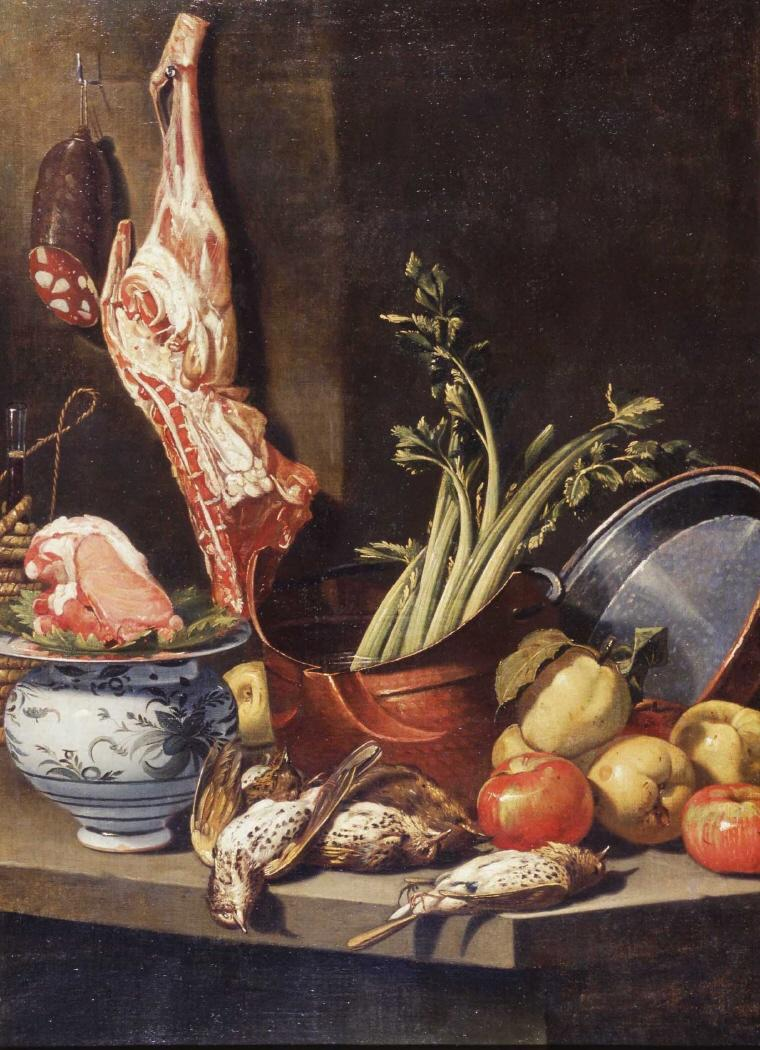
One of several Mediterranean cuisines: Spanish kitchen still life (Bodegón de cocina) by Cristoforo Munari, c. 1710

On the other hand, Sami Zubaida argues in his book Culinary Cultures of the Middle East (1994) that:

The idea of the "standard Mediterranean" ... is a modern construction of food writers and publicists in Europe and North America earnestly preaching what is now thought to be a healthy diet to their audiences by invoking a stereotype of the healthy other on the shores of the Mediterranean. Their colleagues in Mediterranean countries are only too willing to perpetuate this myth. The fact of the matter is that the Mediterranean contains varied cultures.

The cookery author Clifford A. Wright wrote in 1999: "There really is no such thing as 'Mediterranean cuisine'. At the same time, we seem to know what we mean when we use the expression ..." Wright argued that David's book itself was largely about specifically French Mediterranean food, pointing out that "only 4 percent of her recipes come from North Africa or the Levant", so that the focus was on an aspect of European cuisine, largely omitting coverage of Middle Eastern cuisine.

Since David's time, a variety of books on Mediterranean cuisine have been written, including Abu Shihab's 2012 book of that name; Helstosky's 2009 book; books by other cookery writers include S. Rowe's Purple Citrus and Sweet Perfume: Cuisine of the Eastern Mediterranean (2011); and Mari-Pierre Moine's Mediterranean Cookbook (2014). There are many more cookbooks covering specific cuisines in the Mediterranean area, such as B. Santich's The Original Mediterranean Cuisine: Medieval Recipes for Today (1995), on Catalan and Italian recipes; and H. F. Ullman's (2006), on the cooking of Tunisia, Spain, and Italy, each one subtitled "Mediterranean Cuisine".

=== Origins ===
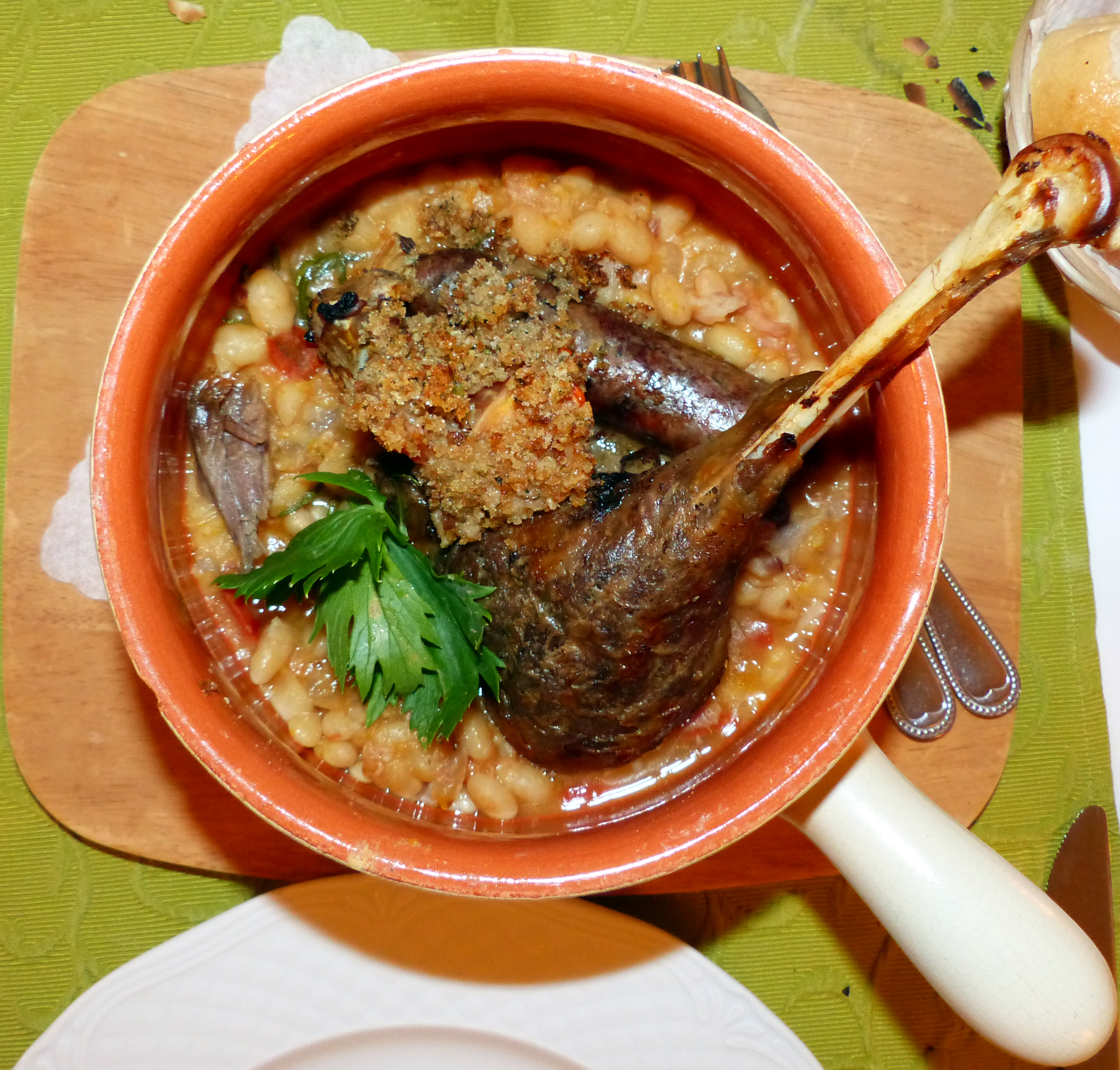
The haricot beans used in a southern French cassoulet were brought to Europe from the Americas.

The ingredients of Mediterranean cuisine are to an extent different from those of the cuisine of Northern Europe, with olive oil instead of butter, and wine instead of beer. The list of available ingredients has changed over the centuries. One major change was the introduction of many foods by the Arabs to Portugal, Spain, and Sicily in the Middle Ages. Those foods included aubergines, spinach, sugar cane, rice, apricots, and citrus fruits, creating the distinctive culinary tradition of Al-Andalus.

Another major change was the arrival of foods from the Americas in early modern times (around the sixteenth century), notably the incorporation of the potato into Northern European cuisine, (Note: Barrels of potatoes were exported from the Canary Islands to Antwerp in 1567.) and the eager adoption of the tomato into Mediterranean cuisine. The tomato, so central now to that cuisine, was first described in print by Pietro Andrea Mattioli in 1544. Similarly, many of the species of Phaseolus beans now used around the Mediterranean, including P. vulgaris (the French or haricot bean), were brought back from the Americas by Spanish and Portuguese explorers.

In mountainous areas of the Mediterranean, wheat was often replaced by chestnuts as a staple food, earning the chestnut tree the name "bread tree".

== Cooking ==
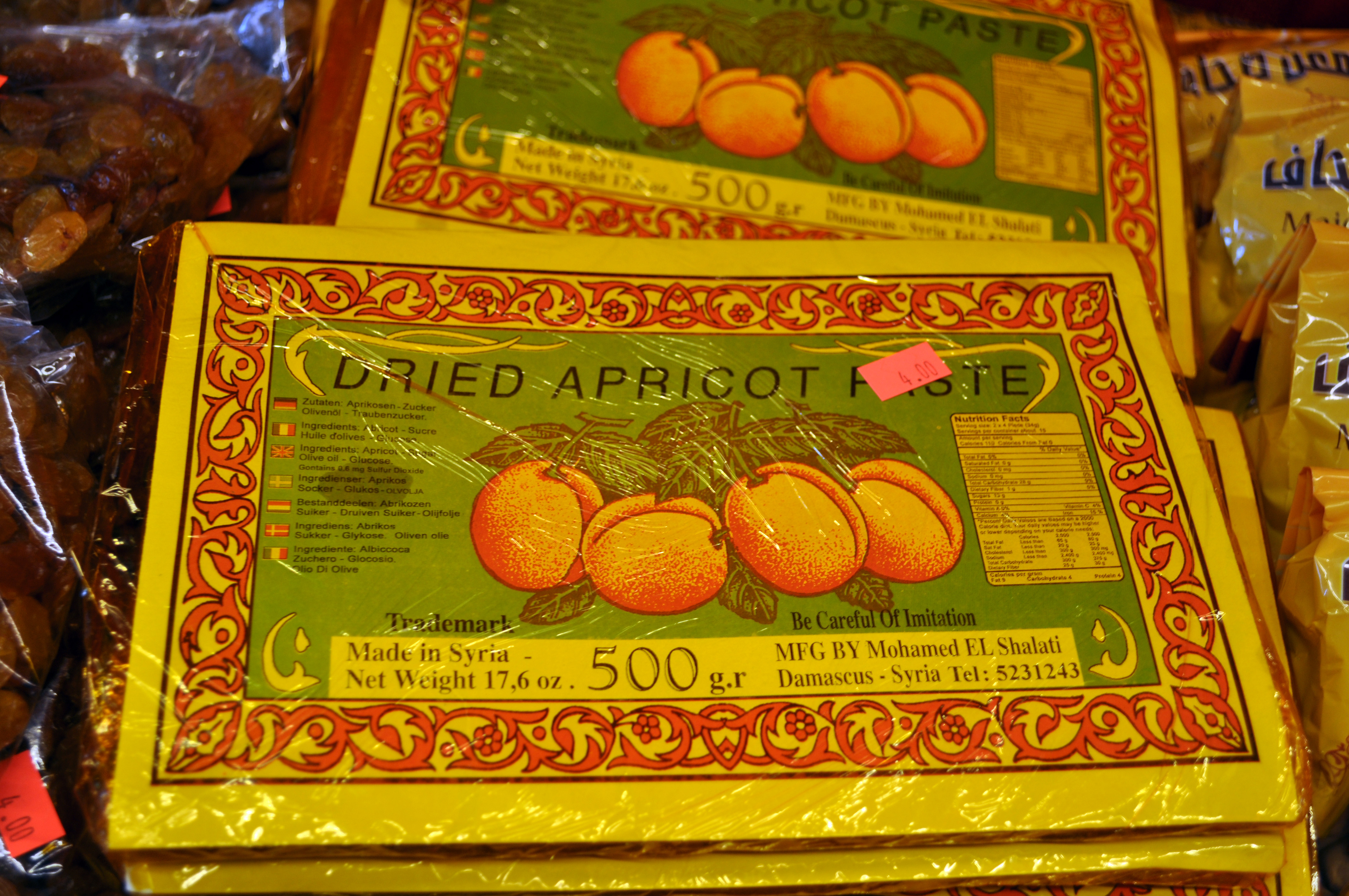
Syrian apricot paste "dissolved in water to make a cooling drink"

David's introduction to her 1950 book characterises the cooking of the Mediterranean countries as "conditioned naturally by variations in climate and soil and the relative industry or indolence of the inhabitants". She identifies "the ever recurring elements" in the food of this extensive region as olive oil, saffron, garlic, "pungent" local wines, as well as the "aromatic perfume" of herbs, especially rosemary, wild marjoram, and basil, and the bright colours of fresh foods in the markets, "pimentos, aubergines, tomatoes, olives, melons, figs" and "shiny fish, silver, vermilion, or tiger-striped". She includes cheeses of "sheep's or goat's milk", "figs from Smyrna on long strings" and "sheets of apricot paste which is dissolved in water to make a cooling drink".

With common ingredients including the olive, wheat, and grape; a shared climate; and a long period for cultural exchange, it might be expected that a single, pan-Mediterranean cuisine would have developed. Certain items, such as olive oil, bread, wine, roast lamb, or mutton (such as Maghrebi méchoui, Greek kleftiko and souvlaki, and Turkish shish kebab), bottarga, and stews of meat with vegetables and tomato (such as Spanish andrajos, French estouffade à la provençale, Italian ciambotta, and Turkish buğu kebabı), are indeed found all around the Mediterranean. Seafood including sea bream and squid is eaten, often in stews, stuffed, or fried, in Spanish, French, and Italian dishes. Despite this, however, the lands bordering the Mediterranean sea have distinct regional cuisines, from the Maghrebi, Levant, and Ottoman to the Italian, French, and Spanish. Each of those, in turn, has national and provincial variations.

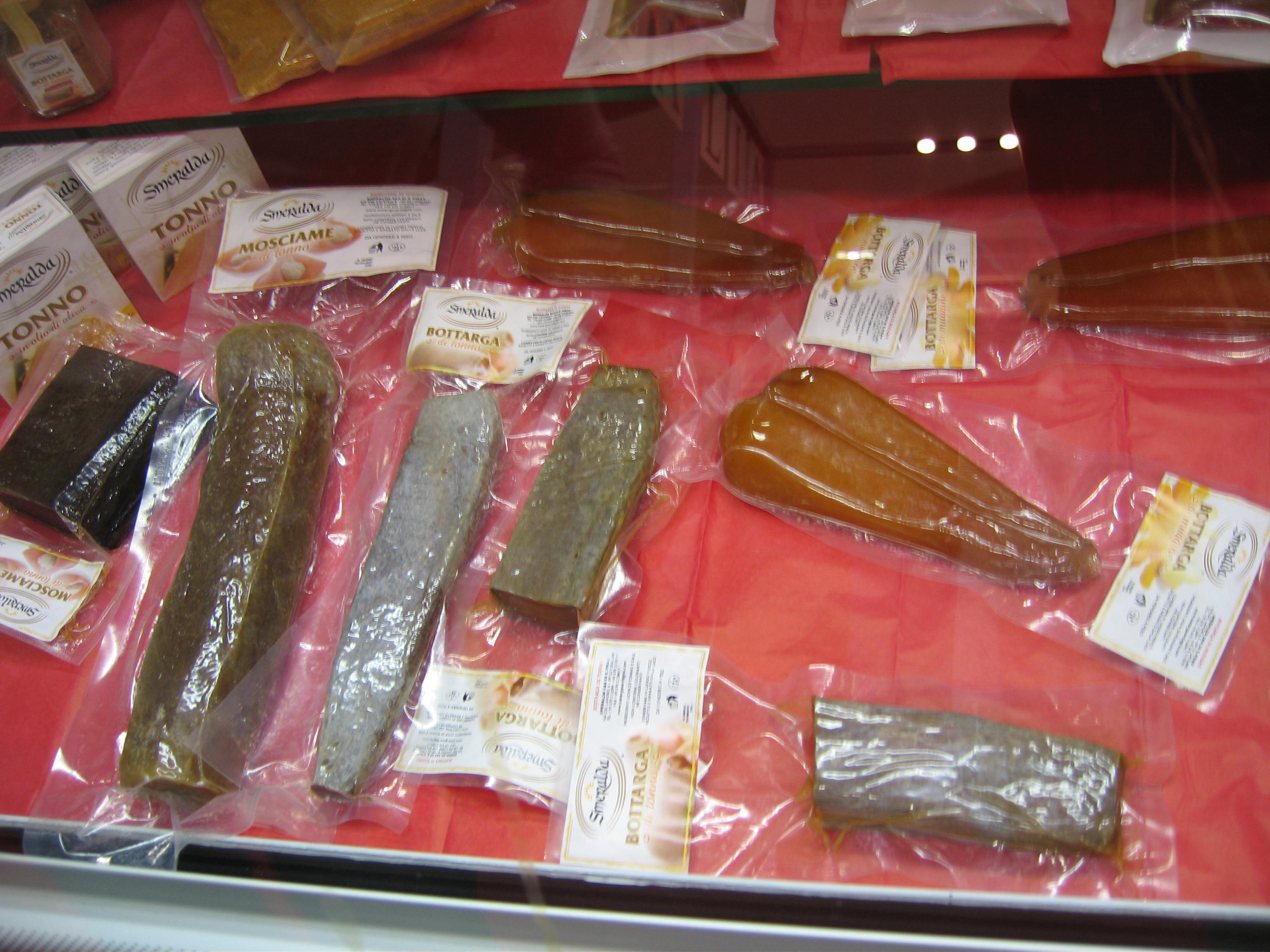
Certain foods are pan-Mediterranean, such as bottarga, the salted, cured roe of fish such as the grey mullet.

The major culinary regions of the Mediterranean

=== Maghrebi ===
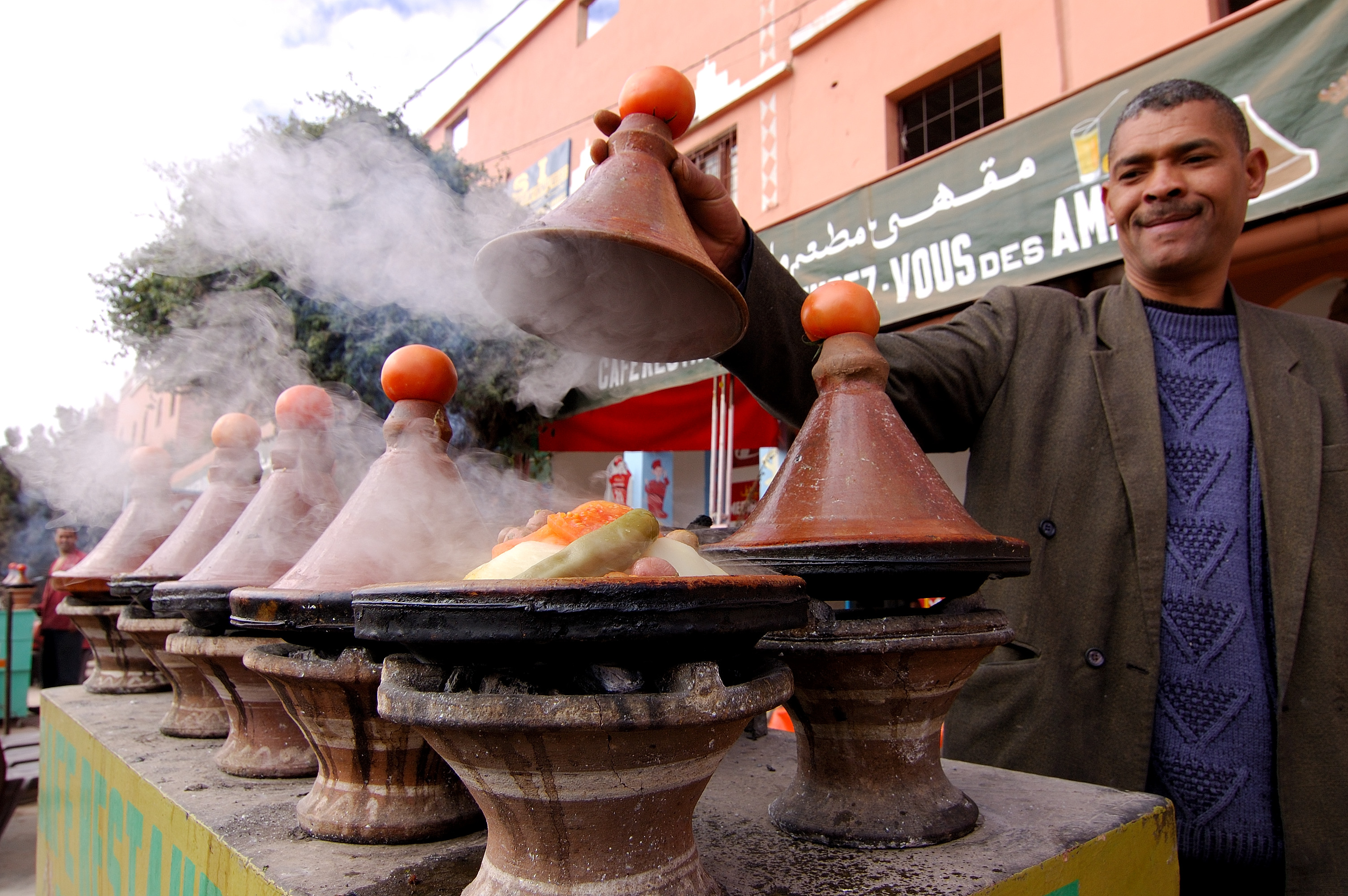
Tagines slow-cooking on a Moroccan street

Mediterranean Maghrebi cuisine includes the cuisines of Algeria, Libya, Morocco, and Tunisia. One of the most characteristic dishes of the region is couscous, a steamed, small-grained wheat semolina, served with a stew. The dish is ancient, mentioned by the Medieval traveller Ibn Battuta, and found for example also in the Western Sicilian cuisine, especially in the province of Trapani, where it was re-introduced after 1600.

One stew that may be served with couscous is the Moroccan tagine, a hearty, somewhat dry dish of meat and vegetables, cooked slowly in a pot (called a tagine) with a tall conical lid. Dishes from the Maghreb region of North Africa are often coloured and flavoured with the hot spice mixtures harissa and ras el hanout (containing such spices as cumin, coriander, saffron, cinnamon, cloves, chillies, and paprika). Other characteristic flavourings of the region are preserved lemons and dried apricots and raisins.

=== Egyptian ===
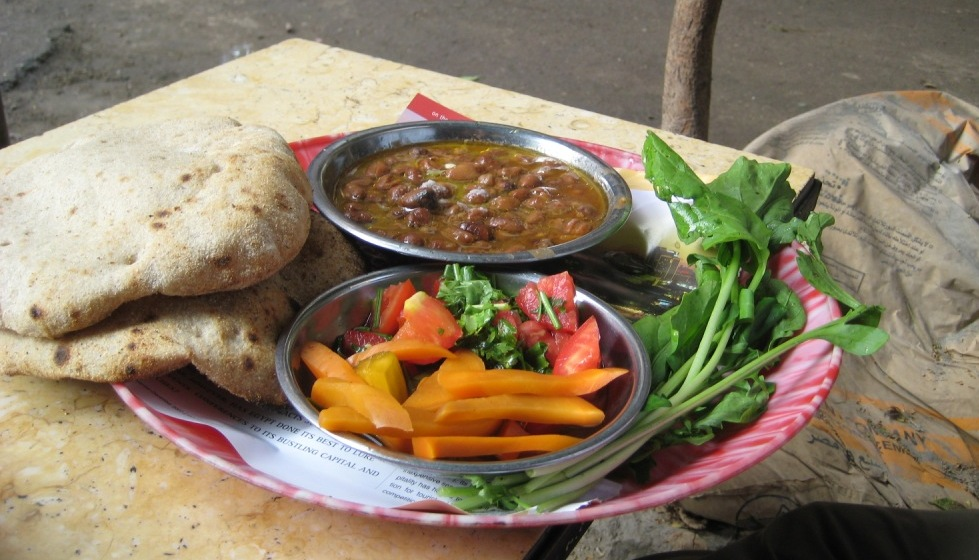
Ful medames on an Egyptian street with bread and pickled vegetables

Egyptian cuisine has ancient roots, with evidence that, for example, cheese has been made in Egypt since at least 3,000 BC. Falafel are small fried croquettes of bean or chickpea (Note: The chickpea is the usual base in Egypt; it has been grown in the region for 7,500 years.) flour, currently also eaten across the Levant and the West, but originating in Egypt's Roman era; they are claimed as theirs by Coptic Christians. Duqqa is a dip made of pounded herbs, hazelnuts, and spices, eaten with bread. Kushari is a vegan dish of rice, lentils, and pasta, variously garnished; it began as food for the poor, but has become a national dish.

=== Levantine ===
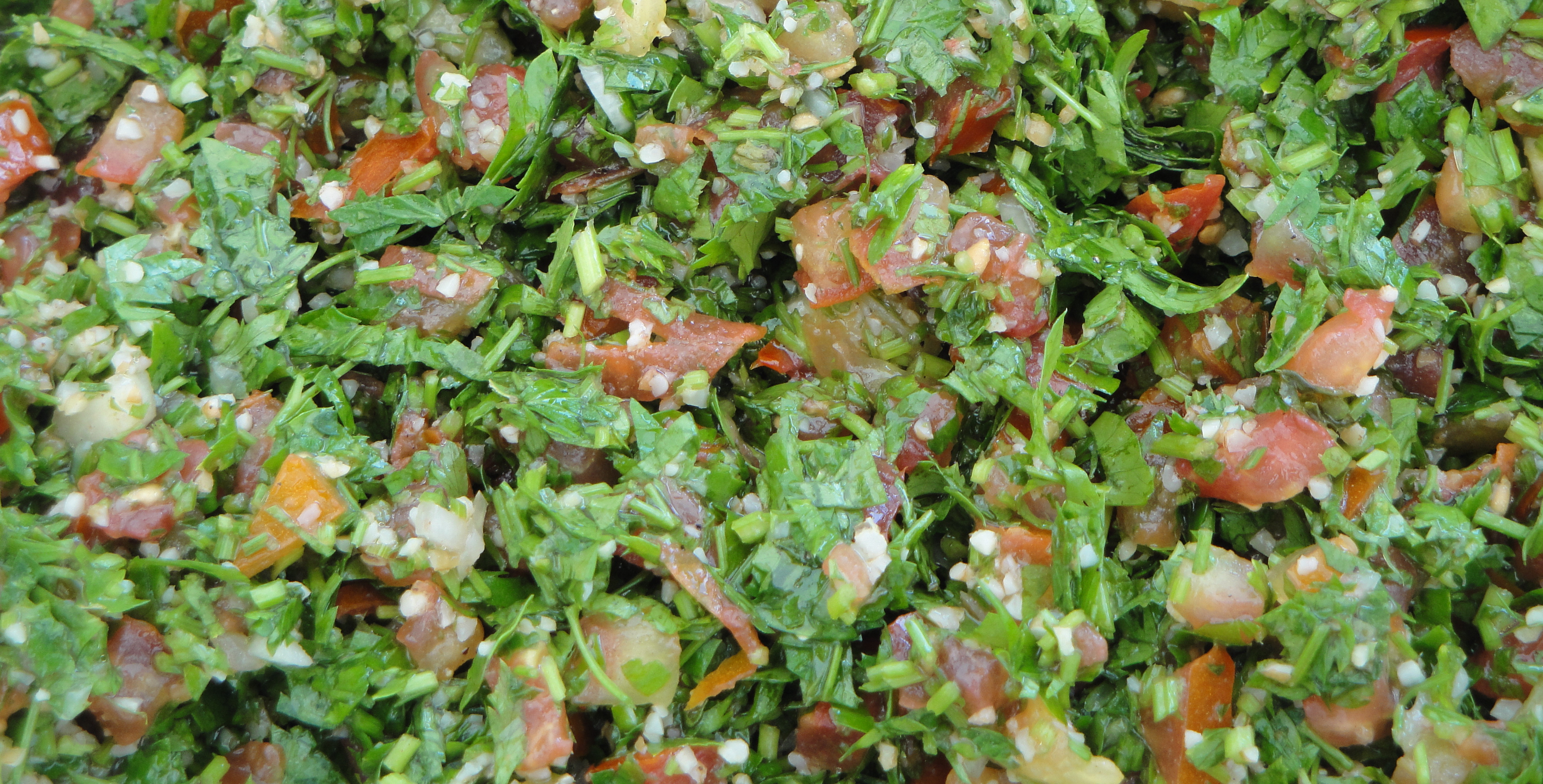
Levantine tabbouleh

Levantine cuisine is the cooking of the Levant (Mediterranean coast, east of Egypt). Among the most distinctive foods of this cuisine are traditional small meze dishes such as tabbouleh, hummus, and baba ghanoush. Tabbouleh is a dish of bulgur cracked wheat with tomatoes, parsley, mint, and onion, dressed with olive oil and lemon juice. Baba ghanoush, sometimes called "poor man's caviar", is a puree of aubergine with olive oil, often mixed with chopped onion, tomato, cumin, garlic, lemon juice, and parsley. The dish is popular across the whole of the Eastern Mediterranean and North Africa.

Ful medames, originally from Egypt and still a national dish there, consists of fava beans with oil and cumin; it is popular throughout the Levant. The dish may be ancient: dried beans of Neolithic age have been found near Nazareth, Israel.

=== Ottoman ===
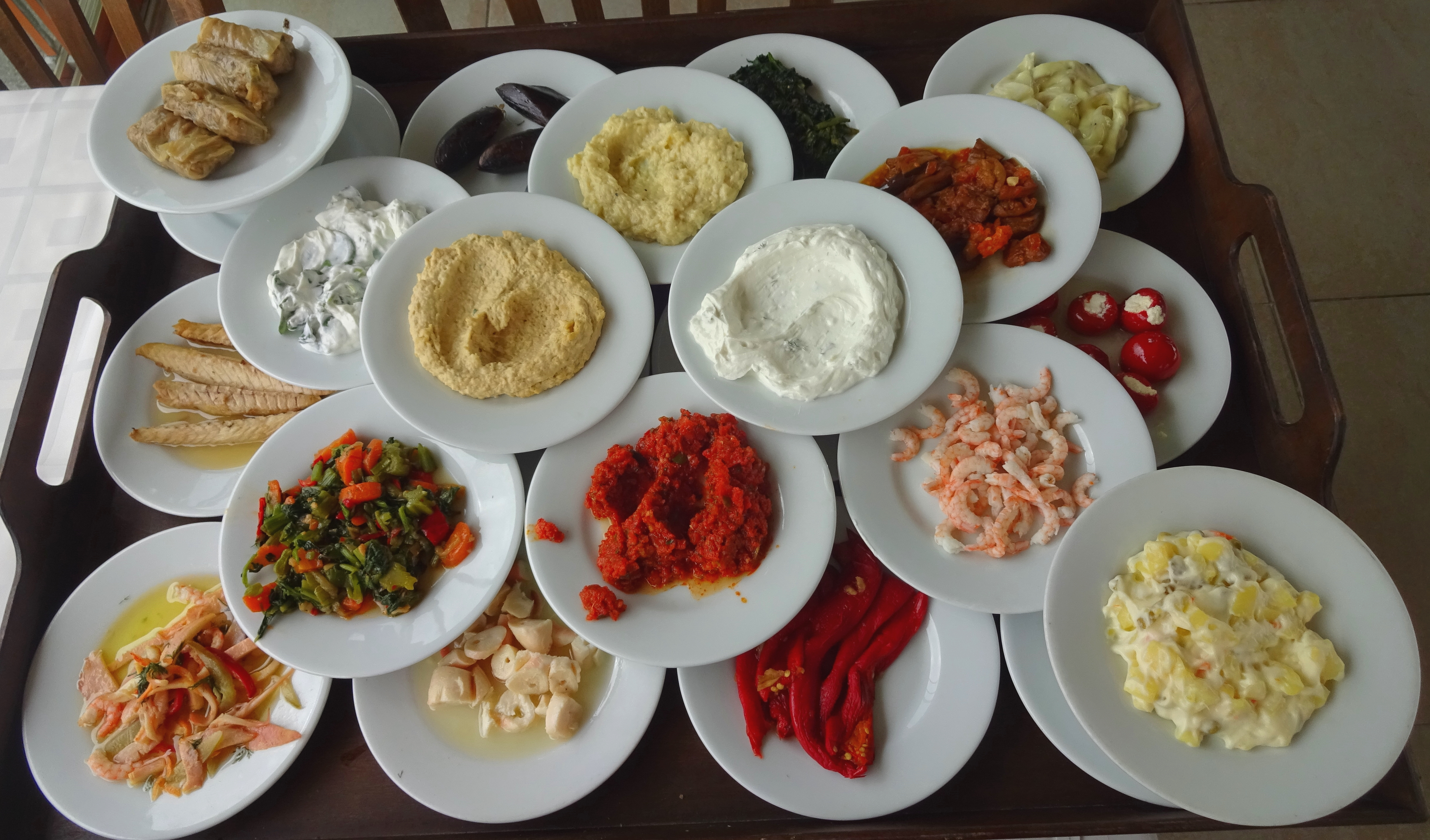
Ottoman and Turkish cuisine combine similar elements.

Ottoman cuisine has given rise to the cuisines of modern Turkey, parts of the Balkans, Cyprus, and Greece. A distinctive element is the family of small flaky pastries called börek. These are popular and widespread across the Eastern Mediterranean region, and date as far back as ancient Roman times. Börek are made of thin sheets of filo pastry, filled with mixtures such as meat, caramelised onion and sweet peppers.

Another widespread (Note: Elizabeth David stated that "mousaká" was "well known all over the Balkans, Turkey, and the Middle East".) and popular dish is moussaka, a baked dish of aubergine or potato with various other ingredients: often minced meat and tomatoes, sometimes a layer of egg custard or béchamel sauce on top. In its Greek variant, well known outside the region, it includes layers of aubergine and minced meat with custard or béchamel sauce on top, but that version is a relatively recent innovation, introduced by the chef Nikolaos Tselementes in the 1920s.

=== Greek ===
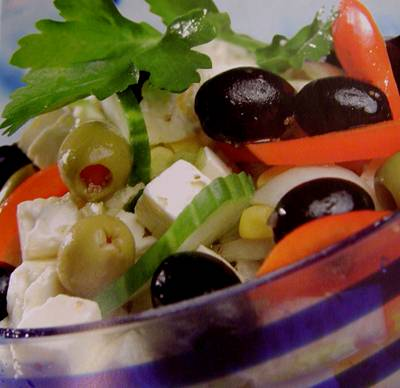
Greek salad

Greek cookery makes wide use of vegetables, olive oil, grains, fish, wine, and meat (white and red, including lamb, poultry, rabbit, and pork). Other important ingredients include olives, cheese, aubergine, courgette, lemon juice, vegetables, herbs, bread, and yoghurt. Some more dishes that can be traced back to ancient Greece are: lentil soup, fasolada, retsina (white or rosé wine flavoured with pine resin), and pasteli (sesame seeds baked with honey); some to the Hellenistic and Roman periods include: loukaniko (dried pork sausage); and Byzantium: feta cheese, avgotaraho (bottarga), and paximadhia (rusk). Lakerda (pickled fish), mizithra cheese and desserts such as diples, koulourakia, moustokouloura, and melomakarono also date back to the Byzantine period, while the variety of different pitas probably dates back to ancient times. Much of Greek cuisine is part of the larger tradition of Ottoman cuisine, the names of the dishes revealing Arabic, Persian, or Turkish roots: moussaka, tzatziki, yuvarlakia, keftes, and so on. Many dishes' names probably entered the Greek vocabulary during Ottoman times, or earlier in contact with the Persians and the Arabs. However, some dishes may be pre-Ottoman, only taking Turkish names later; the historians of food John Ash and Andrew Dalby, for example, speculate that grape-leaf dolmadhes were made by the early Byzantine period, while Alan Davidson traces trahana to the ancient Greek tragos and skordalia to the ancient Athenian skorothalmi.

=== Balkan ===
David barely mentioned the non-Greek Balkans, stating only that yoghurt and moussaka are widespread in the region. Some later cooks, such as Paula Wolfert, give a few recipes from Dalmatia, some being Ottoman.

Albena Shkodrova notes that the cuisines of the coastal provinces of Istria and Dalmatia were influenced by Venice. She adds that cuisines labelled as "Italian" and "Mediterranean" are becoming popular in the Balkans, which she calls "a historical crossroads of Oriental, Mediterranean and Central-European influences".

=== Italian ===
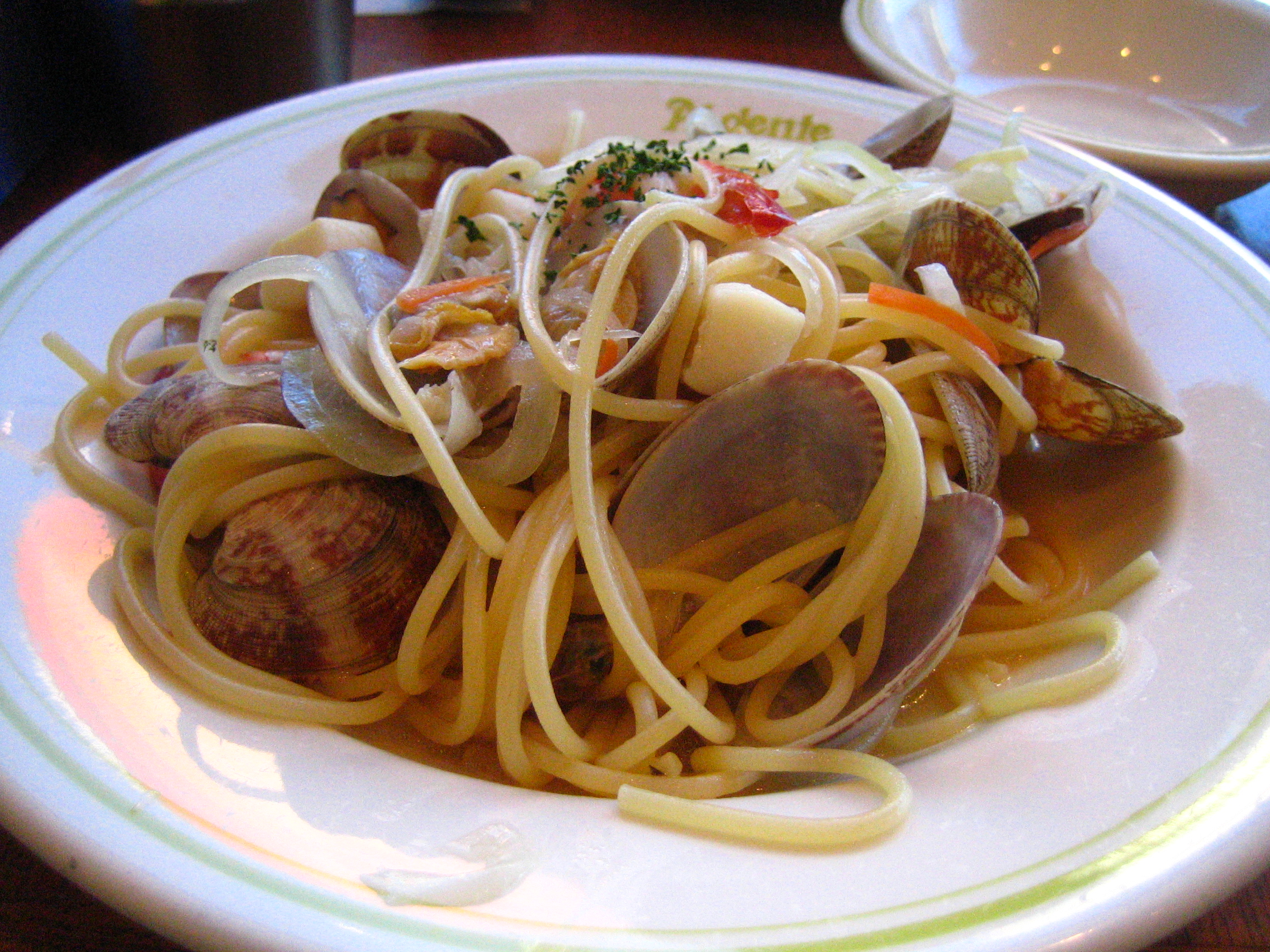
Spaghetti alle vongole, a typical Italian dish of pasta with clams

Mediterranean Italian cuisine includes much of Italy outside the north and the mountainous inland regions. It is a diverse cuisine, but among its best-known and most characteristic foods are pizza in Neapolitan and Sicilian styles, pasta dishes such as spaghetti, and risotto.

Risotto is a dish made using Italian short-grain rice, which is both highly absorbent and resistant to turning into a pudding when cooked with stock and flavoured with onions and garlic, cooked in butter. Anna Gosetti della Salda's book of Italian regional cookery lists 37 risotto recipes, 18 of them from the Veneto. Variations among Veneto risottos can include chicken, eels, quails, or clams.

Pizza is a piece of bread dough rolled out thin, with a topping which varies from place to place, but is generally much simpler than those in the English-speaking world. Although the toppings in Italian pizzas may be, depending on the order, unquantifiable, in the most rigorous tradition of Neapolitan cuisine there are only two variants: Margherita and marinara.

Spaghetti dishes also vary. It may be eaten as David says "simply with olive oil and garlic", without cheese, or with a sauce of "very red and ripe peeled tomatoes", cooked briefly and flavoured with garlic and either basil or parsley.

=== French ===
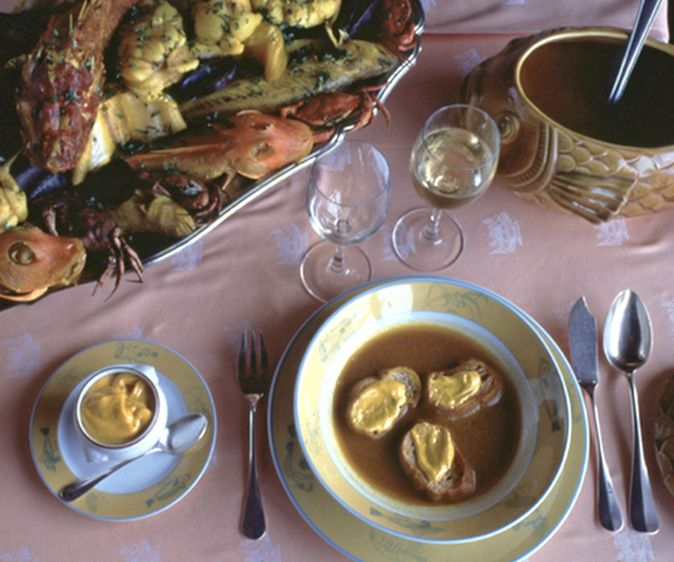
Marseille bouillabaisse, with the fish served separately after the soup

Mediterranean French cuisine includes the cooking styles of Provence, Occitania, and the island of Corsica. Distinctive dishes that make use of local ingredients include bouillabaisse and salade niçoise.

Bouillabaisse is a substantial dish from the French port of Marseille, capital of Provence. It is a stew for at least eight people, because it should contain many types of fish such as crayfish, gurnard, weever, John Dory, monkfish, conger eel, whiting, sea bass, and crab. These are cooked with Mediterranean vegetables and herbs, namely onions, garlic, tomatoes, thyme, fennel, parsley, bay, and orange peel. (Note: David's recipe is from M. Reboul's La Cuisinière Provençale.)

Salade niçoise is a colourful salad of tomatoes, tuna, hard-boiled eggs, Niçoise olives, and anchovies, dressed with a vinaigrette.

=== Spanish ===
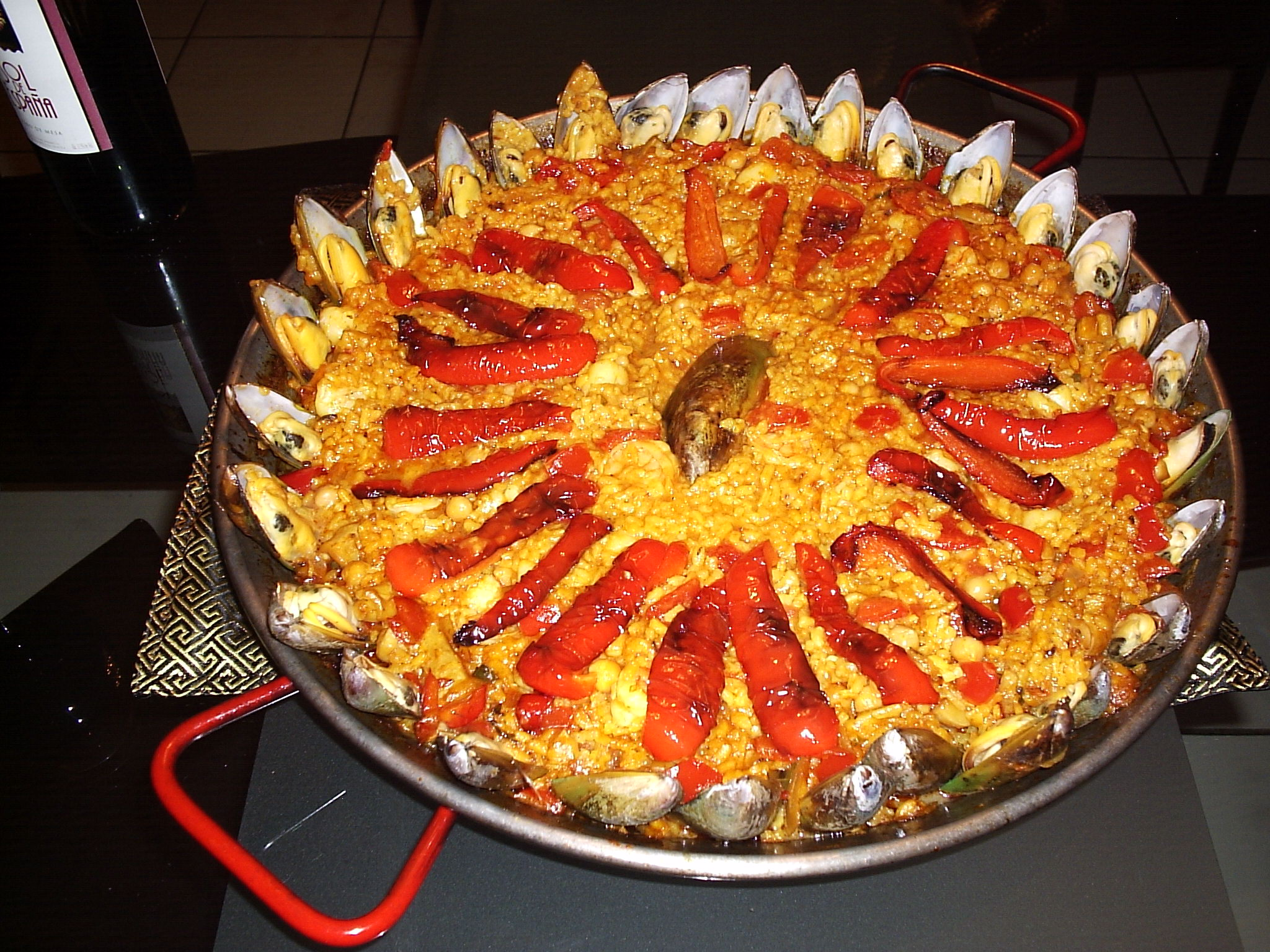
Spanish paella with red peppers and mussels

Spain's varied Mediterranean cuisines include the cooking of Andalusia, Murcia, Catalonia, Valencia, and the Balearic islands. Paella is a characteristic Spanish dish, originally from Valencia, radiating early on to Catalonia and Murcia along Spain's Mediterranean coast. It comes in many versions, and may contain a mixture of chicken, pork, rabbit, or shellfish, sautéed in olive oil in a large shallow pan, with vegetables, and typically round-grain rice (often of the local albufera, arròs bomba, sénia varieties or similar) cooked to absorb the water and coloured with saffron. The dish may be varied with artichoke hearts, peas, sweet peppers, lima beans, string beans, or sausages.

Catalan cuisine has developed over centuries since ancient times in a cultural context distinct from that of other parts of Spain. It arose from the cooking of the Romans who occupied Iberia for nearly 700 years, until the latter part of the 5th century. Catalan cooking is a sophisticated cuisine with its own methods and recipes, and was influenced by Moorish, French, and Italian cookery. It shares with other Mediterranean cuisines ingredients such as bread and wine, fresh herbs and fruit, olive oil, garlic, tomatoes, peppers, onions, fish and shellfish, rice, pasta, sausages, lentils, chickpeas, and nuts including hazelnuts, almonds, and pine nuts.

=== Portuguese: partly Mediterranean ===
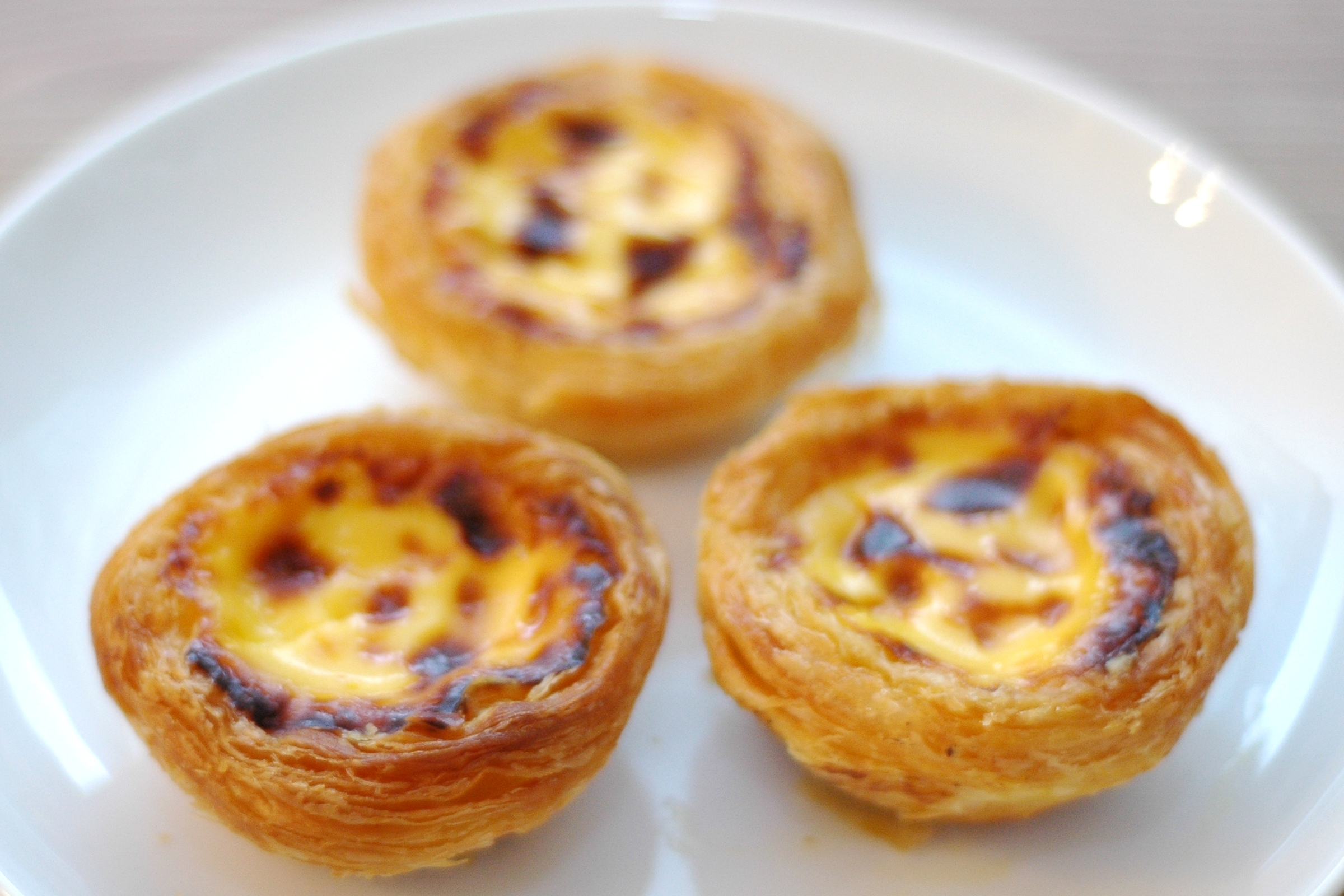
Pastéis de nata

Portugal lies on the Atlantic, not the Mediterranean, but it is in the Mediterranean basin, characterised by olive groves and over much of the country a Mediterranean climate. However, Portugal's Atlantic coast is significantly wetter. Its cuisine too is partly Mediterranean, with the usual trio of bread, wine, and olive oil, but also partly Atlantic, with a tradition of fishing and many seafood dishes such as seafood rice (arroz de Marisco), clams, squid (lulas grelhadas), and bacalhau, imported salted cod. There are, equally, many meat dishes, using chicken, pork, and rabbit. Other major ingredients are onions, garlic, sweet peppers (pimentão), and chouriço sausage. Piri-piri, a sauce made with chili peppers, garlic and oil, is popular.

Portuguese vegetables include the tomatoes common in Mediterranean cuisine, but also kale, carrots, and broad beans. Sweet dishes include pastéis de nata, custard tarts with cinnamon. The country produces red wines such as Alentejo.

== Anise spirits ==
Anise spirits of the Mediterranean region

Anise is used around the Mediterranean to flavour various traditional spirits, including:

- French pastis and absinthe
- Turkish rakı
- Greek ouzo
- Italian sambuca
- Spanish anisado
- Levantine arak
- Algerian anisette cristal

== Mediterranean diet and cuisine ==
The Mediterranean diet, popularised in the 1970s, is inspired by the cuisine of Greece, especially Crete, and Southern Italy in the early 1960s. The American Diabetes Association writes about "Mediterranean-Style Eating", mentioning "the traditional Mediterranean lifestyle ... of ... eating healthfully ... together among family and friends", and asserting that "Mediterranean cuisine is plant-based", citing the ingredients "whole grains, fruits, vegetables, herbs and spices, beans, nuts, seeds, and olive oil", and stating that most foods "in a Mediterranean diet come from plants".

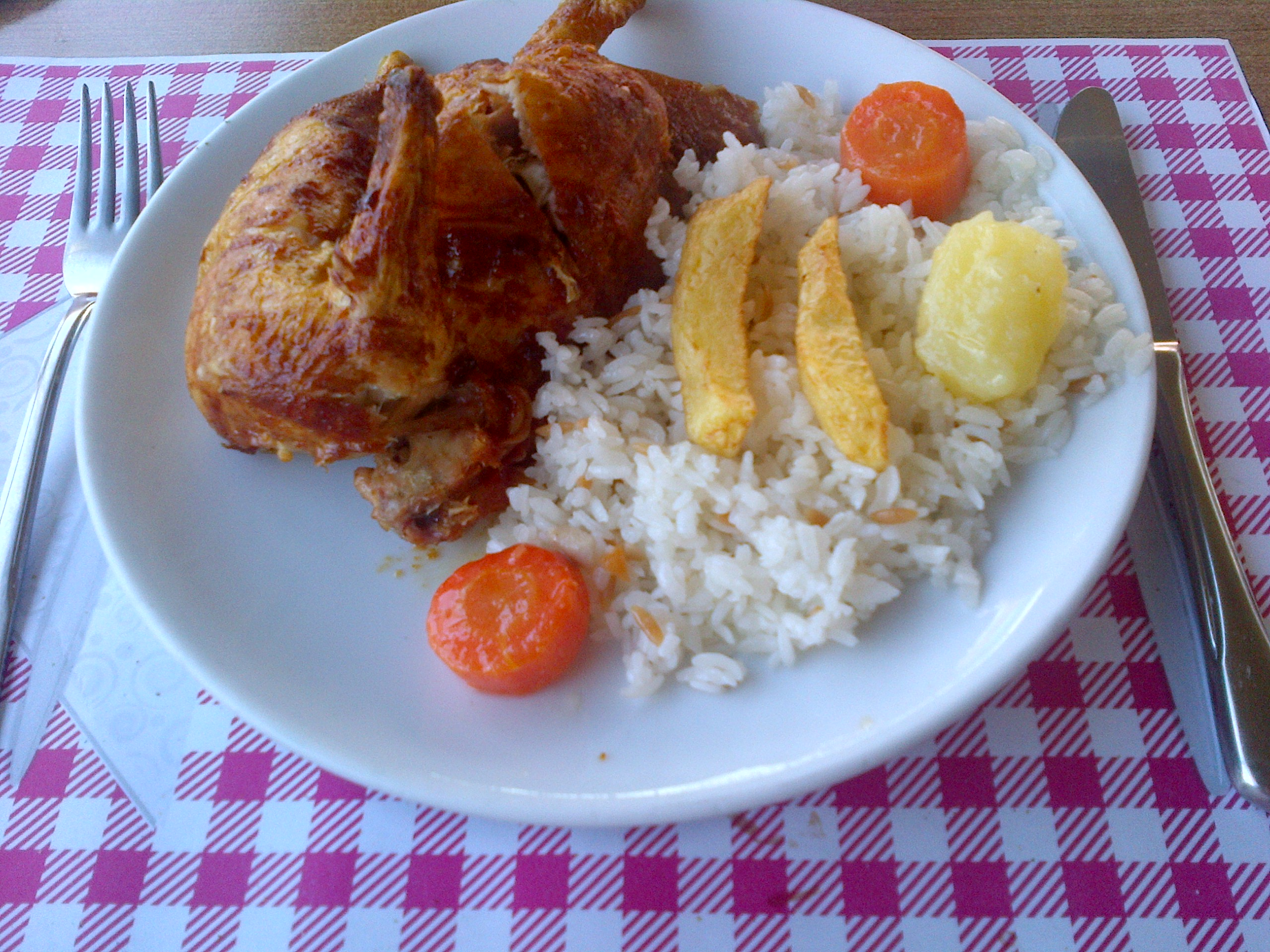
Fast food, Turkish style: with increasing wealth, people around the Mediterranean are changing their diet, towards more meat (here, fried chicken) and less vegetables.

The 1984 Guida all'Italia gastronomica states that, "around 1975, under the impulse of one of those new nutritional directives by which good cooking is too often influenced, the Americans discovered the so-called Mediterranean diet. The name even pleased Italian government officials, who made one modification: changing from diet—a word which has always seemed punitive and therefore unpleasant—to Mediterranean cuisine."

Since David wrote about Mediterranean food in 1950, and indeed since dietary researchers showed in the 1950s that people around the Mediterranean had less coronary heart disease than the peoples of Northern Europe, the traditional Mediterranean ways of life and of eating have changed. Increased wealth and busy lives have led people to eat more meat and less vegetables: their diet is becoming more Northern European, with more convenience foods and with less of a preventive effect on cardiovascular disease.

In 2013, "Mediterranean diet", stated to encompass the "skills, knowledge, rituals, symbols and traditions concerning crops, harvesting, fishing, animal husbandry, conservation, processing, cooking, and particularly the sharing and consumption of food" of the Mediterranean basin, was inscribed on the UNESCO Representative List of the Intangible Cultural Heritage of Humanity.

== Bibliography ==
- Dalby, Andrew (1996). Siren Feasts: A History of Food and Gastronomy in Greece. Routledge. ISBN 978-0-415-11620-6.
- David, Elizabeth (1988) [1950]. A Book of Mediterranean Food. Dorling Kindersley [John Lehmann].
- Davidson, Alan (2014). Tom Jaine (ed.). The Oxford Companion to Food (3rd ed.). Oxford University Press. ISBN 978-0-19-967733-7.
- Essid, Mohamed Yassine (2012). "Chapter 2. History of Mediterranean Food". MediTerra: The Mediterranean Diet for Sustainable Regional Development. Presses de Sciences Po. pp. 51–69. ISBN 978-2-7246-1248-6.
- Helstosky, Carol (2009). Food Culture in the Mediterranean. Food culture around the world. Greenwood Press. ISBN 978-0-313-34626-2.
- Moine, Mari-Pierre (2014). Mediterranean Cookbook. Dorling Kindersley. ISBN 978-1-4093-4724-8.
- Rowe, Silvena (2011). Purple Citrus and Sweet Perfume: Cuisine of the Eastern Mediterranean. HarperCollins. ISBN 978-0-06-210220-1.
- Santich, Barbara (1995). The Original Mediterranean Cuisine: Medieval Recipes for Today. Wakefield Press. ISBN 978-1-86254-331-7.
- Abu Shihab, Sana Nimer (2012). Mediterranean Cuisine. AuthorHouse. ISBN 978-1-4772-8309-7.
- Wright, Clifford A. (1999). A Mediterranean Feast: The Story of the Birth of the Celebrated Cuisines of the Mediterranean from the Merchants of Venice to the Barbary Corsairs, with More than 500 Recipes. William Morrow. ISBN 978-0-688-15305-2.
