= Cream of Wheat =

Brand name of breakfast porridge

- Type: Porridge
- Course: Breakfast
- Place of origin: United States
- Region or state: Grand Forks, North Dakota
- Invented: 1893
- Serving temperature: Hot
- Main ingredients: Farina, water or milk

Cream of Wheat is an American brand of farina, a type of breakfast porridge mix made from wheat middlings. It looks similar to grits, but is smoother in texture since it is made with ground wheat kernels instead of ground maize. It was first manufactured in the United States in 1893 by wheat millers in Grand Forks, North Dakota, and debuted at the 1893 World's Columbian Exposition in Chicago, Illinois.

The rice-based Cream of Rice also forms part of the product line, and is often a recommended early food for infants and toddlers and for people who cannot tolerate wheat or gluten.

Cream of Wheat was owned by Nabisco from 1961 to 2000 when Nabisco was bought by Kraft Foods Inc. B&G Foods acquired the Cream of Wheat and Cream of Rice brands from Kraft in January 2007.

== History ==
The Cream of Wheat Company
- Formerly: Diamond Milling Company (until 1897)
- Type: Public
- Industry: Food
- Founded: 1897
- Defunct: 1961
- Fate: Acquired by Nabisco
- Headquarters: Minneapolis, Minnesota, U.S.

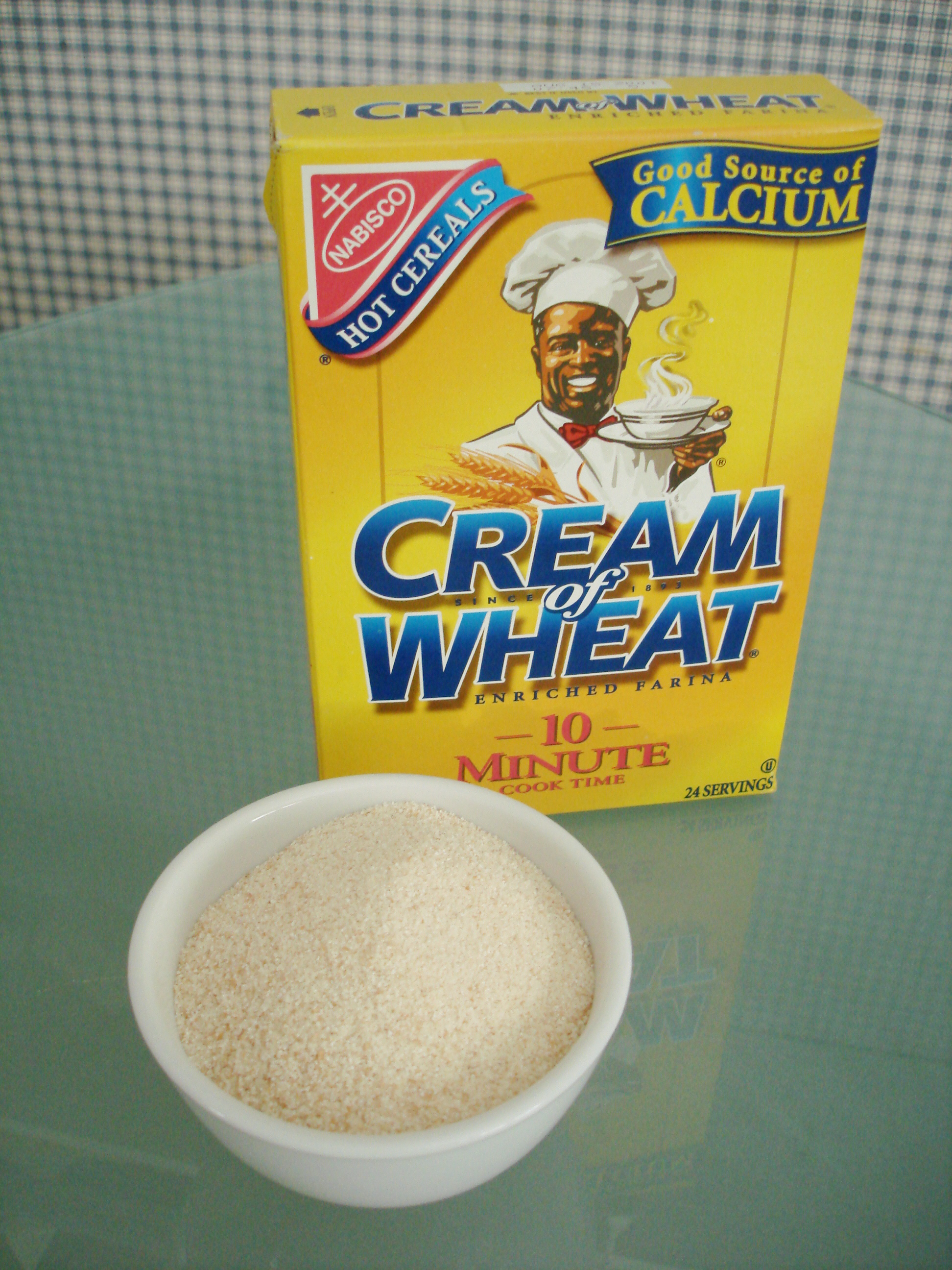
Packaging and powder in a bowl

After the Panic of 1893, the Diamond Milling Company in Grand Forks was faced with low prices and reduced demand for flour. Diamond's Scottish-born chief miller, Tom Amidon, proposed that the company package a breakfast porridge that his wife would make from the portion of the wheat not used in making flour. This was made from the "middlings" of the wheat, a protein rich part of the wheat berry.

After initially being uninterested, Diamond's owners—Emery Mapes, George Bull, and George Clifford—eventually agreed to test the product. They sent 10 cases, in strawboard boxes handmade by Amidon, to their brokers in New York along with a regular shipment of flour. Another employee suggested the name "Cream of Wheat" which was hand-lettered on the boxes along with a stock illustration of a Black chef holding a saucepan which Mapes, a former printer, had on hand. Just hours after the brokers, Lamont, Corliss & Co., distributed the product to grocers they wired Diamond ordering another 50 cases. The next morning, the brokers sent a second telegram saying, "FORGET THE FLOUR. SEND US A CAR OF CREAM OF WHEAT."

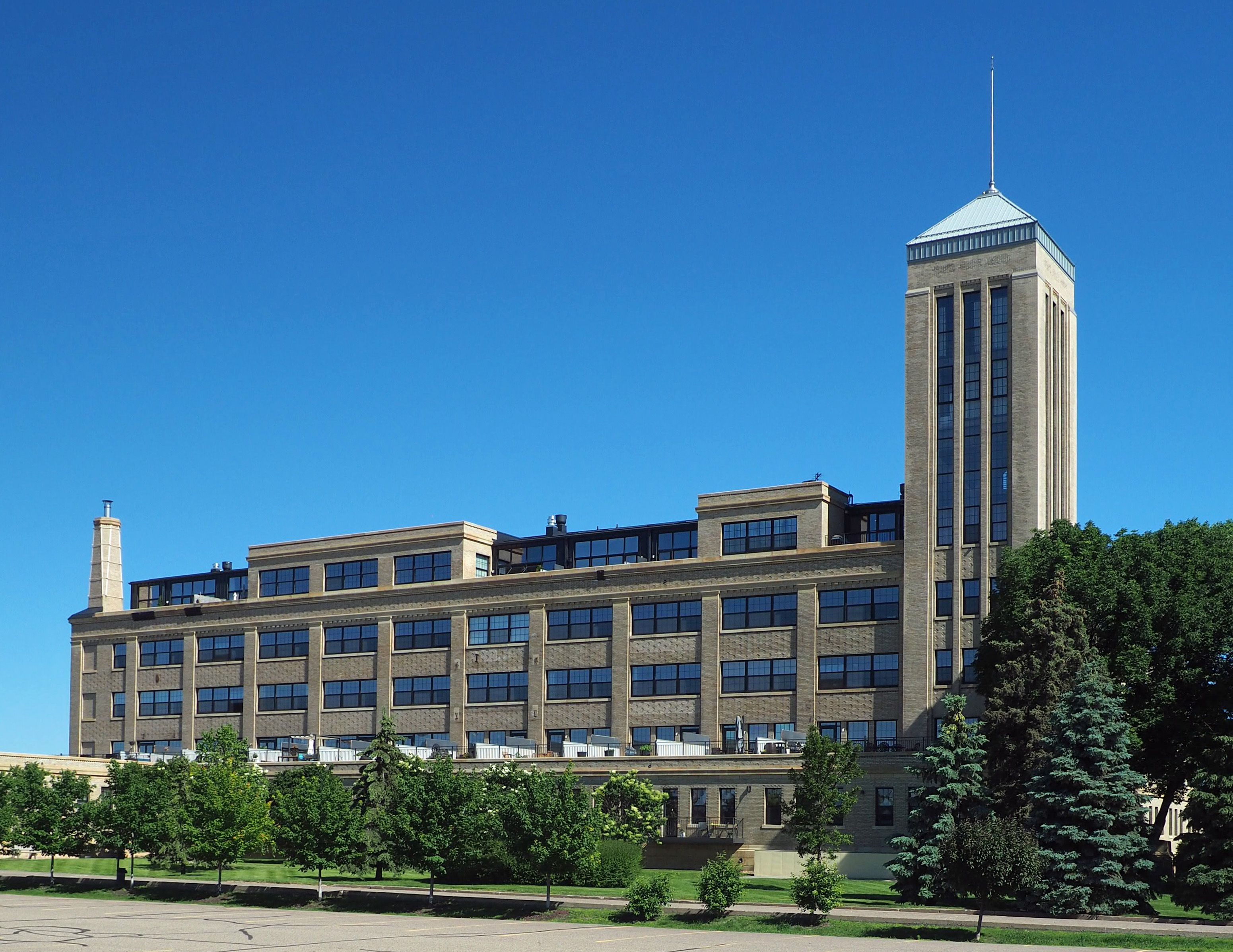
Completed in 1928, the Cream of Wheat building in the Mid-City neighborhood of Minneapolis

Diamond directed its factory to begin manufacturing only Cream of Wheat. As demand increased, the company moved to a new factory in Minneapolis, Minnesota, in 1897, and changed its name to The Cream of Wheat Company. Six years later, the company outgrew its first Minneapolis plant and moved to a new location in the city. This was replaced by a third facility in 1927 where production remained for decades. The company was listed on the New York Stock Exchange in 1929.

While the original variety continued to be produced, the company introduced "Enriched Quick Cream of Wheat" in 1939 which cooked more quickly, 2 1/2 minutes vs. 10 minutes, and had added vitamins and minerals. This was followed in 1958 with "Instant Cream of Wheat" which cooked in 30 seconds. In 1961, Cream of Wheat was acquired by the National Biscuit Co. (later renamed Nabisco) for US$30 million.

Philip Morris Companies acquired Nabisco and with it Cream of Wheat in 2000 and merged it with its Kraft Foods subsidiary. Kraft closed Cream of Wheat's Minnesota plant in 2002, relocating production to other Kraft facilities. In 2007, Cream of Wheat was acquired from Kraft by B&G Foods for approximately US$200 million.

== Cream of Rice ==
The Cream of Rice Company
- Type: Private
- Industry: Food
- Founded: October 1915
- Defunct: 1921
- Fate: Liquidated
- Successor: American Rice Products Company
- Headquarters: Chicago, Illinois, U.S.

Despite the many similarities between the products, Cream of Rice had an entirely separate origin and history to Cream of Wheat prior to 1983 when they were united under Nabisco.

The Cream of Rice Company, a Delaware corporation based in Chicago, was incorporated by T. C. Fredrich, O. C. Wilson, and Howard D. Stewart in October 1915. Frank O. Balch, the company's secretary and treasurer, filed a trademark application for the "Cream of Rice" logo in December 1915. The trademark was registered in 1917. The company reported strong sales initially and market penetration of over half of retail stores in Chicago by February 1916. However, the company was liquidated by court order in 1921. A new company, the American Rice Products Company, was founded in 1921 in New Orleans by a group of investors from Chicago to take over the assets and "Cream of Rice" brand from the failed business.

The brand was acquired in 1937 by Grocery Store Products Company and initially produced in New Orleans. In 1949, production moved to West Chester, Pennsylvania. An attempt by Kraft to acquire Grocery Store Products in 1970 was called off due to objections by the Federal Trade Commission. In 1971 when Grocery Store Products was acquired by Clorox, Cream of Rice went with it but kept its West Chester plant. In 1983, Clorox sold the poorly performing Cream of Rice to Nabisco which already owned Cream of Wheat. Production of both brands was consolidated to the Cream of Wheat manufacturing facilities in Minneapolis after they were acquired along with Nabisco by Kraft.

== Preparation ==
Cream of Wheat is prepared from the box by boiling water or milk, then pouring in the farina while stirring. As it is stirred, the farina starts to thicken. The use of milk instead of (or in addition to) water gives the dish a creamier taste.

In the United States market, there are three unflavored mixes available (10-minute, 2 1/2-minute and 1-minute). In the Canadian market, there are two unflavored mixes available (8-minute and 3-minute).

Cream of Wheat is also sold in an instant format which includes the use of single-serving packets. These are prepared by simply mixing their contents with hot water and allowing the result to set in a bowl for approximately two minutes.

It is common to customize the hot cereal with the addition of sugar, fruit, or nuts. As a result, several flavors are sold of the instant variety: Original, Apples 'N' Cinnamon, Maple Brown Sugar, Strawberries 'N' Cream, and Cinnamon Swirl. In October 2012, Cream of Wheat added a new chocolate flavor to their instant line and later introduced a Bananas & Cream flavor.

== Package design and controversy ==
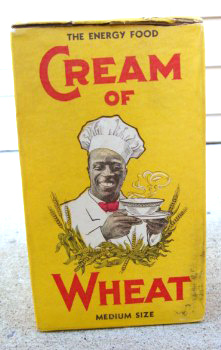
Cream of Wheat box, c. 1919

The original boxes of Cream of Wheat were hand-made and -lettered and were emblazoned with the image of an African American chef (produced by Emery Mapes, one of Diamond Milling Company's owners). The character was named Rastus and was developed by artist Edward V. Brewer. Rastus was included on all boxes and advertisements. It has long been thought that a chef named Frank L. White was the model for the chef shown on the Cream of Wheat box, a claim White himself made. White's headstone contains his name and an etching taken from the man depicted on the Cream of Wheat box.

Leading up to 2020, there had been public pressure aimed at various companies to change branding with perceived racist origins, such as Aunt Jemima and Uncle Ben's. The character of Rastus had once been depicted as a cook who was barely literate and did not know about vitamins. Rastus is also a derogatory term traditionally associated with African Americans in the United States. For these reasons, B&G Foods had been under public pressure for years to make changes.

Public demands to remove symbols of racism increased during the George Floyd protests. In response, on June 17, 2020, B&G Foods announced that it was "initiating an immediate review of the Cream of Wheat brand packaging". Subsequently, on September 25, 2020, the company announced that it was removing the chef's image from all Cream of Wheat packaging.

== Marketing ==
Famous illustrators such as N. C. Wyeth, J. C. Leyendecker, and Henry Hutt all created ads for the Cream of Wheat brand.

== Gallery ==
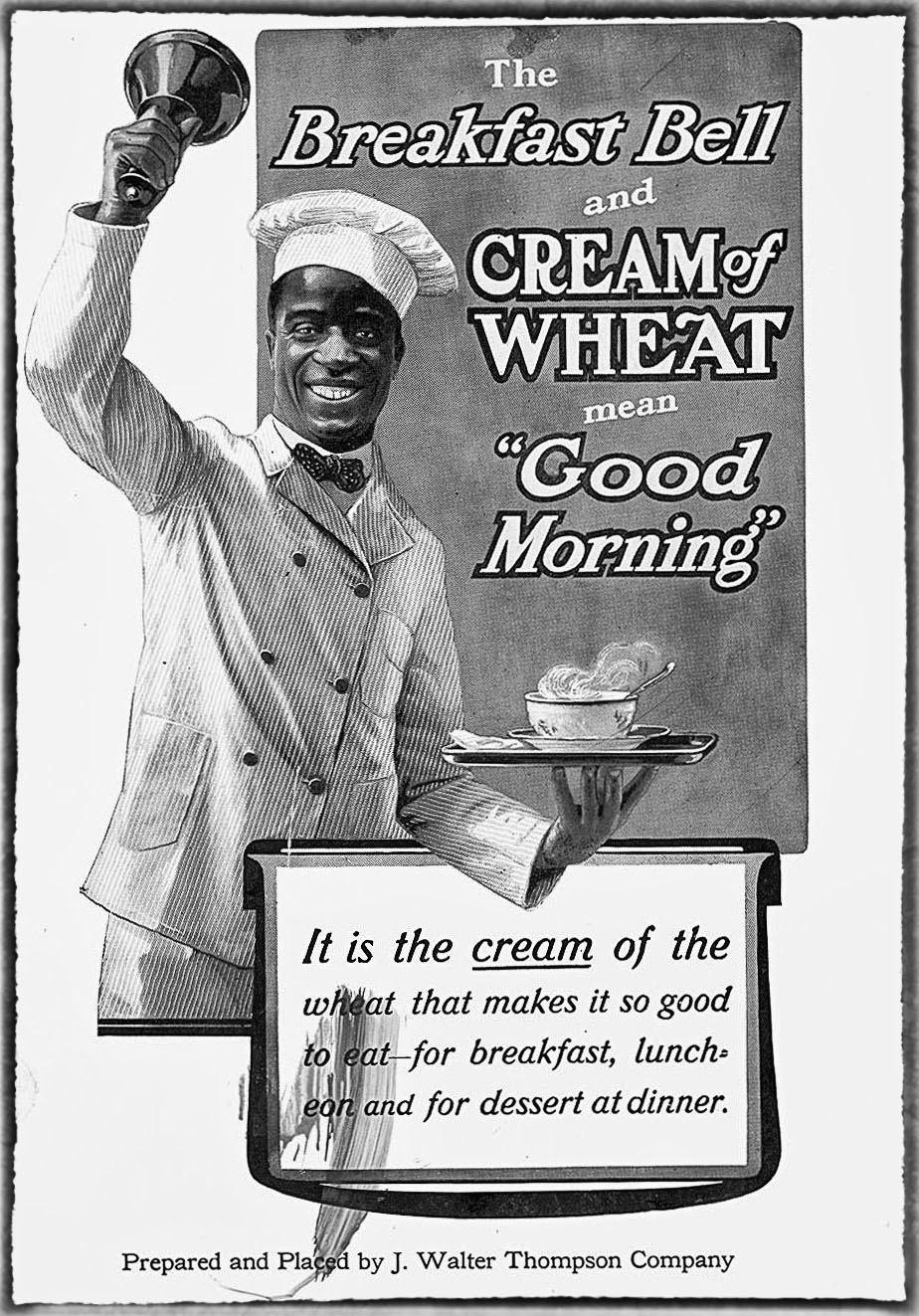
A Cream of Wheat advertisement from 1918

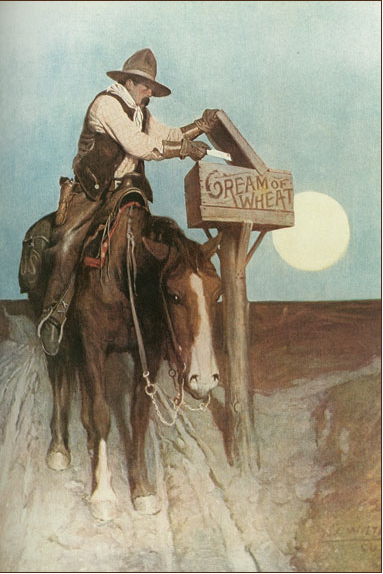
Oil on canvas by N.C. Wyeth 1908 "Where the mail goes Cream of Wheat goes"

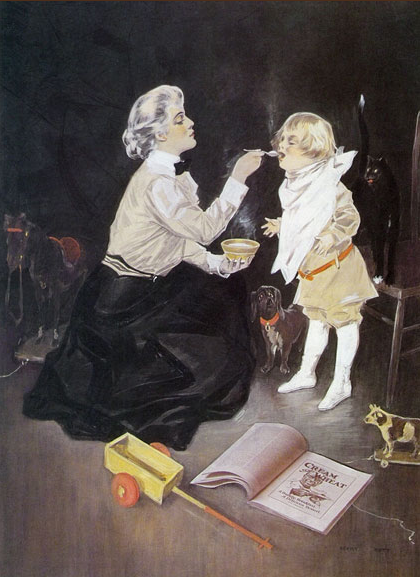
Artist: Henry Hutt – 1908 watercolor

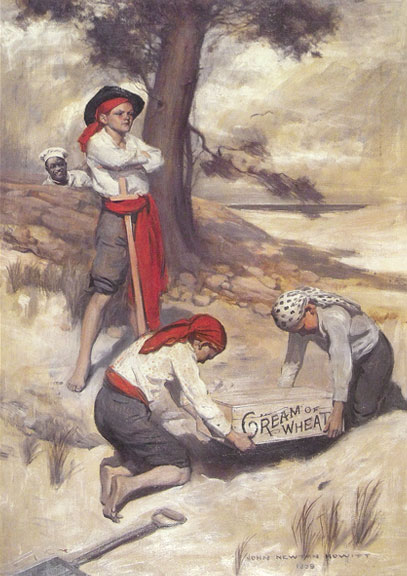
Artist: John Howitt – 1909

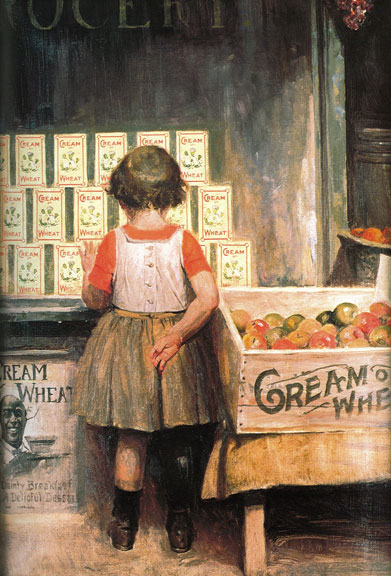
Artist: Denman Fink – 1911

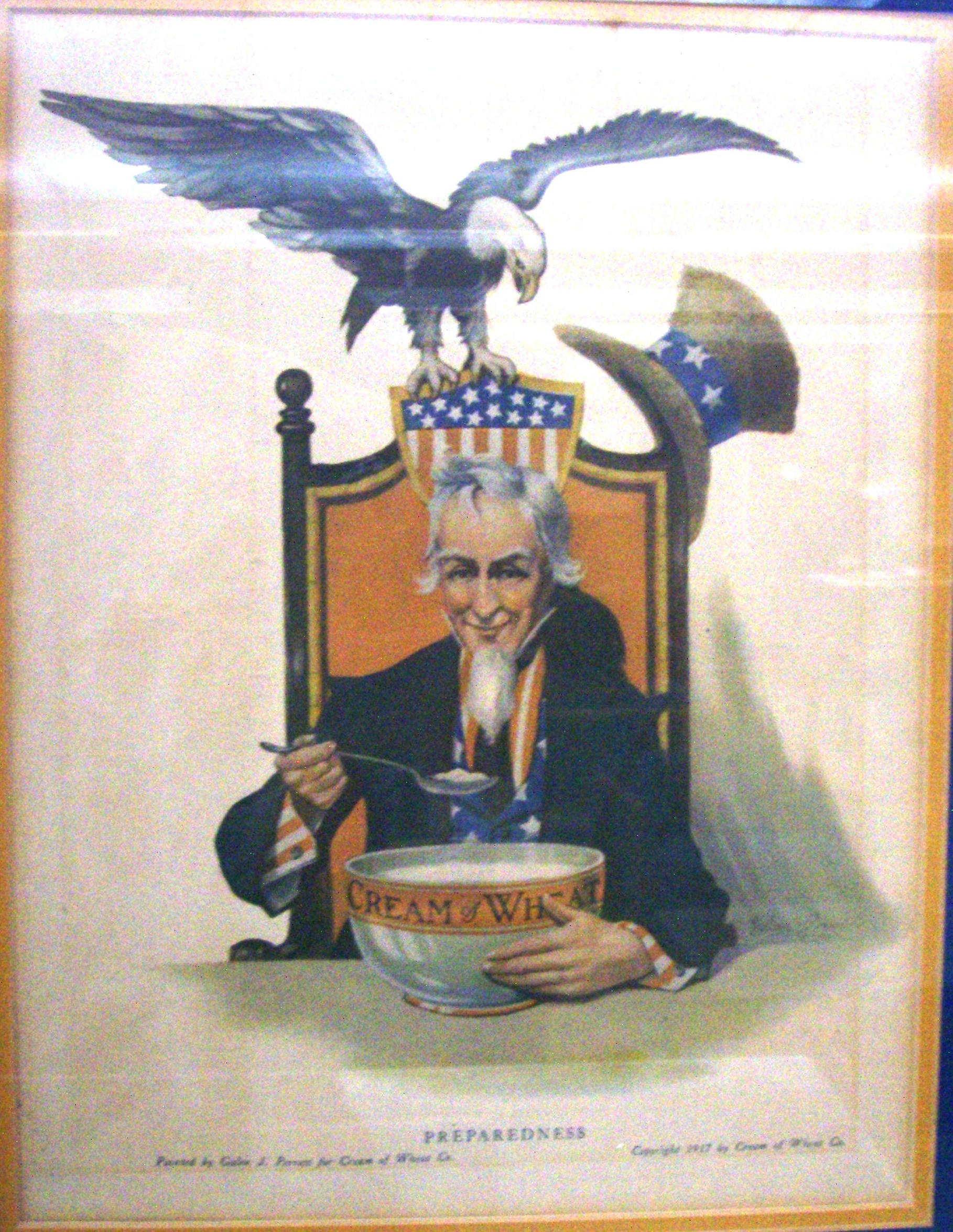
A Cream of Wheat advertisement from 1917

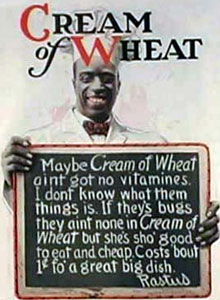
A Cream of Wheat advertisement from between 1901 and 1925

== See also ==
- Frumenty
- Grits
- List of porridges
- Malt-o-Meal
- Maypo
- Semolina
