= Frank L. White =

American chef (1867–1938)

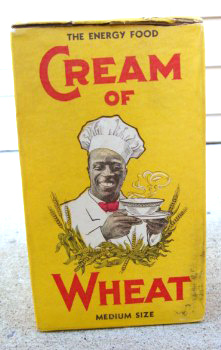
- White's purported likeness on a Cream of Wheat box
- Born: c. 1867; Barbados
- Died: February 15, 1938 (aged 70–71); Leslie, Michigan, U.S.
- Known for: Claimed likeness on Cream of Wheat box

Frank L. White (c. 1867 – February 15, 1938) was an American chef whose likeness, known as "Rastus," is purported to have been featured on the packaging and advertising for Cream of Wheat breakfast cereal from the early 1900s until 2020.

== Biography ==
White was born in Barbados and immigrated to the United States in 1875, becoming a naturalized American citizen in 1890. He was working as a chef at a Chicago restaurant at the time he was alleged to have been photographed for the cereal box in 1900. John Lee Mahin, an advertising agent in the employ of Cream of Wheat executive Emery Mapes, described the origin of the photograph:

One day I was sitting, alone, on a stool in a Kohlsaat restaurant in South Dearborn Street and I noticed particularly two colored waiters who had unusually winning smiles...I then offered each of them fifty cents if they would go down to Copland's Studio, which was only a few doors away, and have their pictures taken. This impressed them as a great joke but they willingly consented. I had about a dozen pictures taken and the one which I liked best showed the negro with one tooth missing, so I arranged to have the photographer re-touch the photo...That marked the birth of the new "Rastus," now so well known to the American public.

Mahin did not record the name of the man in the photograph, and noted that Mapes was unsuccessful in locating him years later. Though the man in the photograph is officially unidentified, a 2004 story in the Jackson Citizen-Patriot said that White was "a chef, traveled a lot, was about the right age and told neighbors he was the Cream of Wheat model". However, authors Roberta Hughes Wright and Wilbur B. Wright III have cast doubt that White was the model, owing to inconsistencies in both his story and the official Cream of Wheat company story.

White lived in Leslie, Michigan, for approximately twenty years until his death on February 15, 1938. He was buried at Woodlawn Cemetery in Leslie with an anonymous marker until an identifying granite gravestone was installed in 2007.

== Legacy ==
In September 2020, B&G Foods announced that images of the Cream of Wheat chef would be removed from packaging. The food manufacturer announced in June that it was reviewing the packaging after concerns the chef character might perpetuate racist stereotypes. "While research indicates the image may be based upon an actual Chicago chef named Frank White, it reminds some consumers of earlier depictions they find offensive," B&G Foods said in a statement. "Therefore, we are removing the chef image from all Cream of Wheat packaging."
