= Louis Van Zelst =

American batboy and mascot (1895–1915)

Louis Van Zelst (1895–1915) was an American batboy, mascot, and good luck charm for the Philadelphia Athletics from 1910 to 1914. Due to an illness sustained at the age of eight, Van Zelst was a hunchback, and was not in the least self-conscious about it, urging Athletics players to rub his hump for good luck.

Van Zelst had originally been a mascot for teams at the University of Pennsylvania, but Athletics players lived in the West Philadelphia neighborhood, and he got to know them. Connie Mack hired him as batboy beginning in 1910, and he attended all home games in that capacity. He made some road trips with the team, and invariably was brought to each World Series game, during a period of success for the Athletics during which they won four pennants and three World Series in five years.

Van Zelst had never enjoyed robust health, and he fell ill of Bright's disease in the winter of 1915. He died in March at the age of 20.

== Childhood ==
Van Zelst was born in Philadelphia. At the age of eight, he sustained a fall which resulted in a twisted spine. Confined to bed for a period of time, he developed a humped back, which could be extremely painful for him.

== Batboy ==
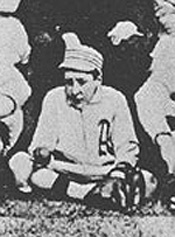
Athletics batboy Louis Van Zelst

Van Zelst tended to hang out around the Penn campus, and became popular at Penn athletic contests. Since some of the Athletics players lived in West Philadelphia, some of the Athletics players, including Rube Oldring, got to know him. One day in 1909, Van Zelst went over to Shibe Park, approached manager Mack, and asked to serve as batboy that day. Mack agreed, and after Van Zelst had competently handled the chores twice (and the Athletics had won both games), hired Van Zelst for the position at home games the following season, having a uniform made for him.

Van Zelst became one of the Athletics family; he was invited to Eddie Collins' wedding and a Baseball Writers' Association of America dinner. He became popular with both Athletics and visiting players. He was taken on at least one road trip per year beginning in 1911, and to spring training beginning in 1912. He exhibited a sunny disposition and was an accomplished mimic, bringing laughter to Mack and his players with his imitation of pitcher Eddie Plank in the batter's box. He would urge players to rub his hump for good luck, which they would do. Mack even sent him out to coach first base in one road game against the Giants; but the umpire required Mack to recall Van Zelst to the dugout.

During the five years that Van Zelst served as batboy, the Athletics won four pennants and three World Series.

== Death ==
Van Zelst's constitution was never robust; Athletics players kept an eye on his physical condition during road trips. In the winter of 1915, he was diagnosed with Bright's disease and died in March after a two-day illness.

== See also ==
- Li'l Rastus
