= Li'l Rastus =

American mascot (1891/92–??)

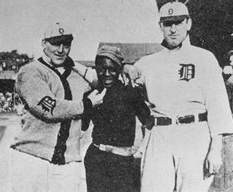
- Li'l Rastus (center) with Heinie Beckendorf (left) and Bill Donovan (right), c. 1909–10
- Born: Ulysses Simon Harrison; 1891 or 1892
- Other name: Rastus Simon
- Years active: 1908–1910
- Known for: Mascot of the Detroit Tigers

Ulysses Simon Harrison (born 1891 or 1892), known as Li'l Rastus and Rastus Simon, was an African American teenager who served as a mascot of the Detroit Tigers baseball team from 1908 to 1910.

== Tigers mascot ==
In the early 1900s, it was not unusual for Major League Baseball teams to casually retain one or more urchins to act as mascots or batboys. Their employment might only last as long as a team's winning streak, and often their only wages were food and shelter. On July 4, 1908, the Detroit Free Press reported that the Tigers had begun traveling with a new mascot, "Rastus," who had been "picked up by [Germany] Schaefer" during the team's recent road trip to Chicago. "He will have a home as long as the present streak lasts," the report added. Harrison served as a mascot for the next three months for the pennant-winning Tigers, who would rub the youth's head for good luck. He traveled with team and even warmed up Tigers pitchers from time to time.

Harrison was dismissed as the Tigers' mascot near the end of the 1908 season, shortly before the Detroiters captured the American League pennant. "Rastus, the negro mascot, has been chased again," wrote the Detroit Free Press. "[Manager Hughie] Jennings let him out today and they got a world's series decision. It looks as if Rastus is gone for good." Harrison's services were quickly enlisted by the National League champion Chicago Cubs, the Tigers' World Series opponent, who went on to win the series four games to one.

Despite his firing, the Tigers brought Harrison back for another pennant-winning season in 1909. By the start of the World Series, Harrison numbered among a half dozen Tigers mascots, including two other boys, one white and one black, who acted as chief mascots. At season's end, Harrison collected $64 in donations (equivalent to $2,293 in 2025) at a post-World Series banquet at the Pontchartrain Hotel, and he returned home to St. Louis. Before the start of the 1910 season, the Detroit Free Press commented on his itinerant life:

[Rastus], who has made so many mysterious jumps with the Tigers, going from town to town without presenting a ticket or paying any cash—drifted in from Indianapolis. He said he was simply wearied of his absence from the town whose team he had helped to win three pennants, and that he had started early in order to be here on time. How Rastus got here he would not divulge.

Harrison was relieved of his duties as mascot for the second and final time in June 1910. After his "unconditional release," he worked briefly as a driver for an ash hauling company.

== Relationship with Ty Cobb ==
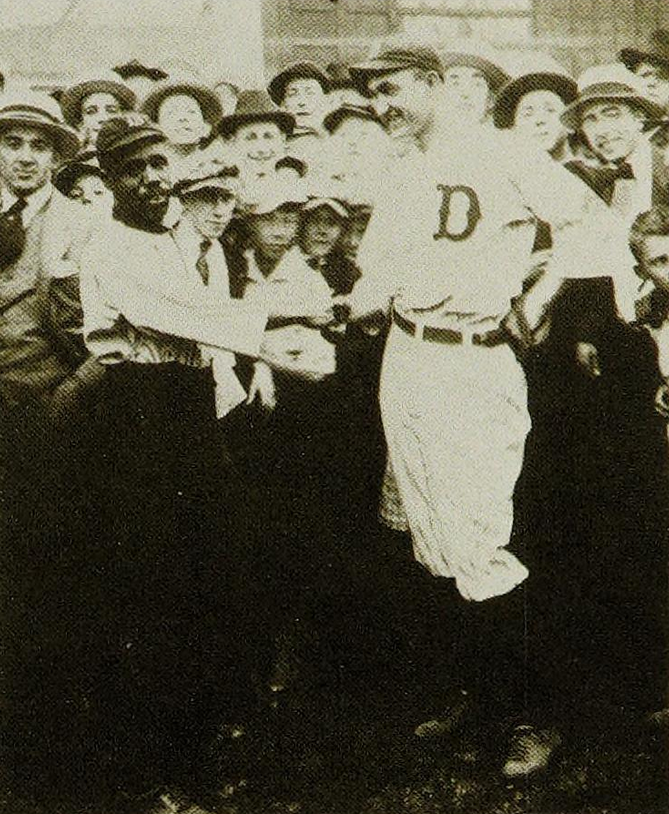
Harrison shaking hands with Ty Cobb in 1918

Ty Cobb emerged as Harrison's "main defender and patron," according to sportswriter H. G. Salsinger. Unlike other Tigers players, Cobb did not rub Harrison's head for good luck, and ensured that he avoided detection while traveling in segregated trains and hotels. During the 1908 and 1909 offseasons, Cobb brought Harrison to Augusta, Georgia to work as a domestic and assistant at Cobb's automobile showroom.

By 1916, Harrison was a 24-year-old married man working as chauffeur for Detroit construction mogul F. H. Goddard, a job he might have secured with Cobb's assistance. A photo of Harrison and Cobb shaking hands at Navin Field appeared in the Detroit News in 1918.

== See also ==
- Rastus
- Louis Van Zelst
