= Rastus =

Pejorative name

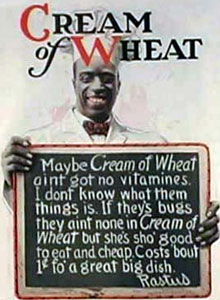
"Rastus" appearing in an advertisement for Cream of Wheat, some time between 1901 and 1925

Rastus is a pejorative term traditionally associated with African Americans in the United States. It is considered offensive. As a type of stock character, Rastus is meant to portray ignorance and foolishness. Similar images have appeared in advertising, prominently as the mascot for Cream of Wheat, which prompted objections from activists.

== History ==
Rastus has been used as a stereotypical, often derogatory, name for black men at least since 1880, when Joel Chandler Harris included a black deacon named "Brer Rastus" in the first Uncle Remus book. However, Rastus (a shortening of Erastus, the Greek name of, especially, Erastus of Corinth) has never been particularly popular as a black name. For example, the 1870 census reported only 42 individuals named Rastus in the United States, of whom only four were Black or mulatto.

Rastus—as a stereotypically happy black man, not as a particular person—became a familiar character in minstrel shows. This is documented in Every Time I Turn Around: Rite, Reversal, and the End of Blackface Minstrelsy by Jim Comer, in fiction such as Adventures of Rufus Rastus Brown in Darktown (1906) and Rastus Comes to the Point: A Negro Farce, in popular songs such as Rastus, Take Me Back (1909) and (Rufus Rastus Johnson Brown) What You Going to Do When the Rent Comes 'Round (1905), on radio, and in films, most notably the 1908–1917 Rastus series of short films, with titles that included How Rastus Got His Chicken and Rastus Runs Amuck.

Rastus is also the name of the African-American character who first appeared on packages of Cream of Wheat cereal in 1893 and whose image remained the Cream of Wheat trademark until the 1920s, when it was replaced by a purported photograph of Frank L. White, a Chicago chef wearing a chef's hat and jacket; White claimed to have been the subject of the photograph used to make the image, but his name was never formally recorded. The food manufacturer announced in June 2020 that it was reviewing the packaging after concerns the chef character might perpetuate racist stereotypes. Cream of Wheat abandoned any human imagery on their packaging in late 2020 in response to concerns the chef's image perpetuated racist stereotypes.

Li'l Rastus was the nickname of an African American youth employed as a mascot by the Detroit Tigers from 1908 to 1910.

Ralph McGill, a staunchly anti-segregationist publisher and columnist for the Atlanta Constitution, was subjected to harassing telephone calls at home from racists asking for "Rastus" McGill.

== Filmography ==
- Rastus Runs Amuck
- How Rastus Got His Chicken
- How Rastus Gets His Turkey
- Rastus Among the Zulus (extant short)
- Rastus Knew It Wasn't (1914)

Some promotional materials for Larry Semon's The Wizard of Oz (1925) identified the black farmhand Snowball as Rastus.

== Theater ==
- Broadway Rastus

== See also ==
- Sambo
- Sambo (film series)
- Magical Negro
- Aunt Jemima
