= Sambo (film series) =

Silent film series

Sambo is a film series that was produced by Siegmund Lubin in the United States from 1909 until 1911. It met with success and was succeeded by the Rastus series. The films followed on the success of British author Helen Bannerman's 1899 children's book The Story of Little Black Sambo and an era of enormous popularity for minstrel performances and songs including earlier films in the "coon" tradition. The films have been described as farces.

== See also ==
- Minstrel show
- Coon song
