= Ciambotta =

Italian stew

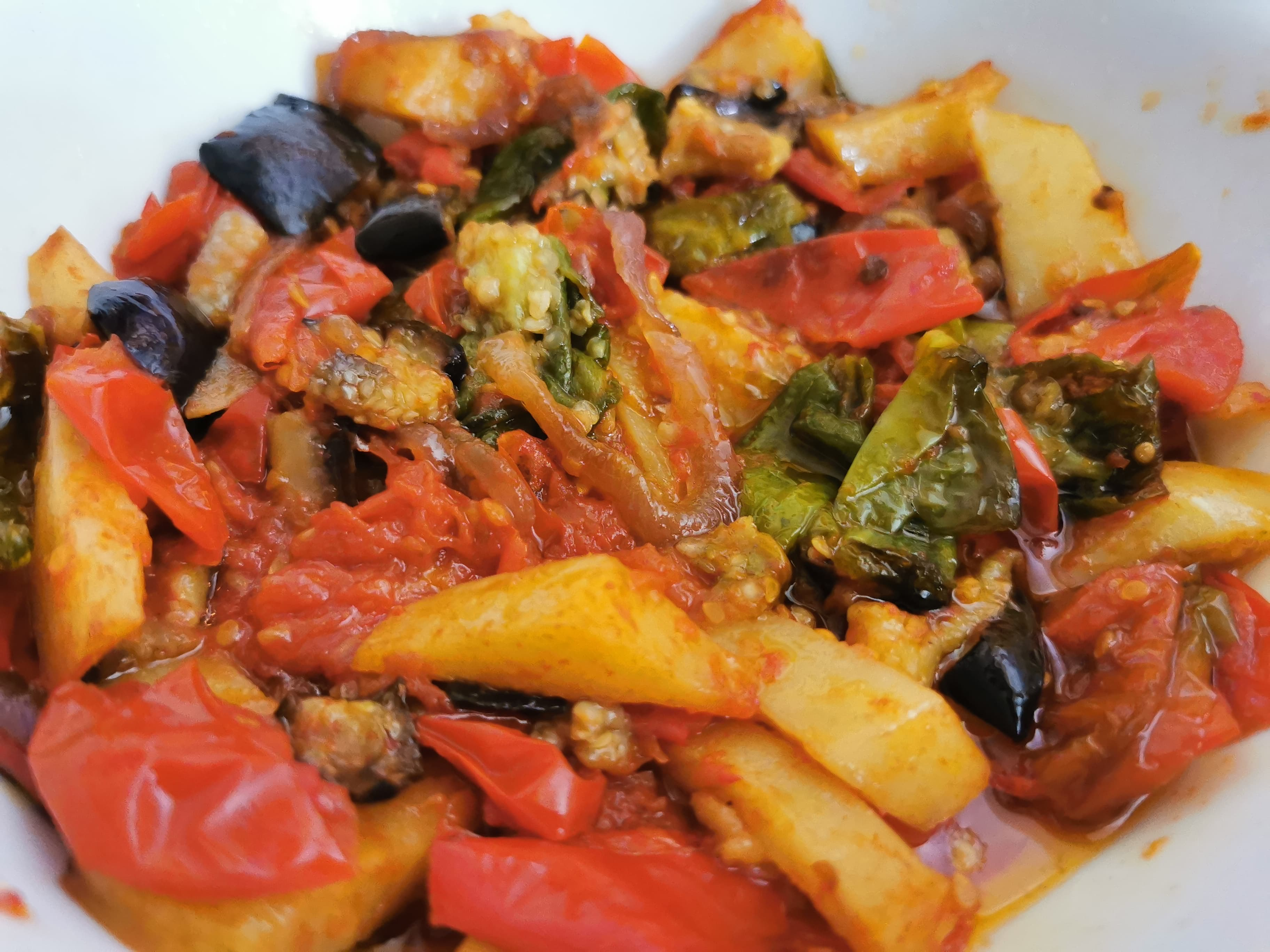
- Alternative names: Ciambotta, giambotta, ciambrotta, ciammotta, cianfotta, ciabotta
- Type: Stew
- Course: Side dish or entrée
- Place of origin: Italy
- Region or state: Southern Italy
- Main ingredients: Vegetables

Ciambotta or giambotta is a summer vegetable stew of southern Italian cuisine. The dish has different regional spellings; it is known as ciambotta or ciambrotta in Calabria and elsewhere, ciammotta in Basilicata and Calabria, cianfotta or ciambotta in Campania and Lazio, and ciabotta in Abruzzo.

Ciambotta is popular throughout southern Italy, from Naples south and many parts of Argentina going by the name "chambota". There are many individual and regional variations of ciambotta, but all feature summer vegetables. Italian eggplant, zucchini, bell peppers, potato, onion, tomatoes, garlic, basil, and olive oil are common ingredients. Ciambotta is most often served as a main course, or alongside grilled meats, such as sausage or swordfish. It is sometimes served with pasta, polenta, or rice.

Ciambotta "is a member of that hard-to-define category of Italian foods known as minestre, generally somewhere between a thick soup and a stew". It is frequently likened to the French ratatouille; both are part of the broader family of Western Mediterranean vegetable stews.

== See also ==
- List of stews
- List of vegetable dishes
