= Henry Hutt =

American painter

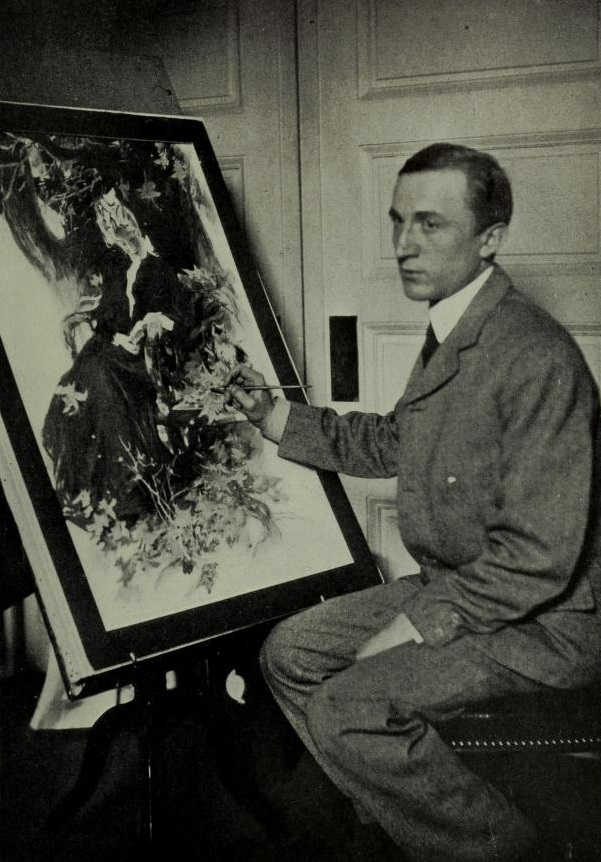
Henry Hutt

Henry Hutt (1875–1950) was an American painter and illustrator born in Chicago. He was educated at the School of the Art Institute of Chicago and was a member of the class of 1892. He was also a member of the Art Students League of the Chicago Art Institute. With several fellow students he formed the Palette and Chisel, an independent artists' association in Chicago.

Among the community of popular illustrators of his time, Hutt was particularly known for his illustrations of modern, elegant women, drawn from models. His work was printed widely in the popular American press, in periodicals such as Collier's, Harper's, and The Century. His illustrations and cover art appeared in dozens of novels and non-fiction books. A monograph was published on his work in 1898.

== Exhibitions ==
- Art Students League group exhibition, Art Institute of Chicago, 1895
- Exhibition of original work by Collier's illustrators, 1905–1906

Corcoran Gallery, Washington, D.C., 1905
American Art Gallery, New York, 1905
Art Institute of Chicago, 1906

== Selected magazine contributions ==
=== Covers ===
- "The Christmas Angel", The Century Magazine, Christmas Number, 1899

=== Illustrations for articles and short stories ===
- Edith Thomas, "The Christmas Dancers", The Century Magazine, Christmas Number, 1899 – three full-page illustrations
- Jack London, "The Game", Metropolitan, April 1905

== Selected Book Illustrations ==
=== Illustrations for Novels ===
- Booth Tarkington, "The Two Vanrevels", McClure, Phillips & Co., 1902
