= Andrajos =

Stew from Spain

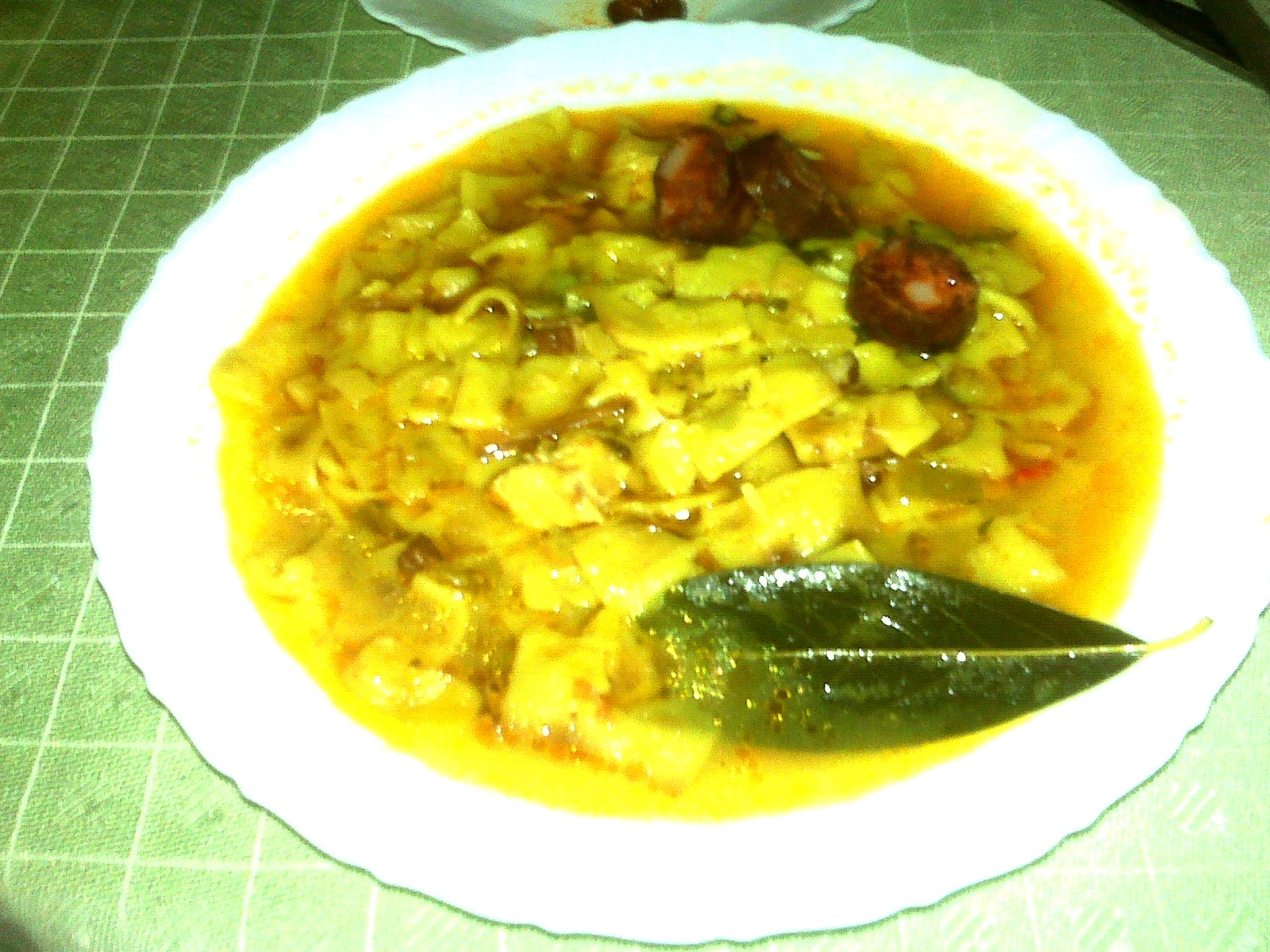
- Type: Stew
- Place of origin: Spain
- Main ingredients: Rabbit (or hare or cod), tomatoes, onions, garlic, red pepper

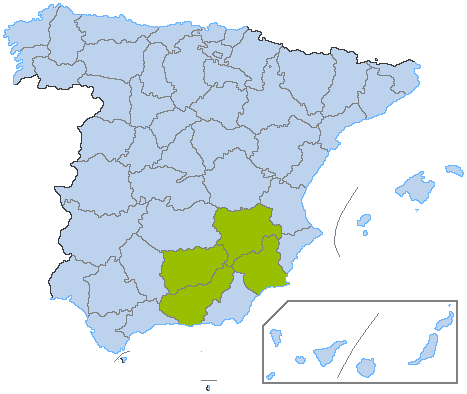
Area of consumption

Andrajos is a typical dish of Jaén province, Albacete, Granada province and Murcia, Spain.

It consists of a stew of tomato, onion, garlic, red pepper and rabbit, thickened with cake flour. It is a dish of the rural people and generally consumed in winter. Variants of the dish derive from the type of meat used. Hare and cod are often used instead of rabbit.

== See also ==
- List of stews
