= Wheat middlings =

By-product of wheat milling

Wheat middlings (also known as millfeed, wheat mill run, or wheat midds) are the product of the wheat milling process that is not flour. A good source of protein, fiber, phosphorus, and other nutrients, they are a useful fodder for livestock and pets. They are also being researched for use as a biofuel.

== Production ==
White flour is made entirely from the endosperm or protein/starchy part of the grain, leaving behind the germ and the bran or fiber part. In addition to marketing the bran and germ as products in their own right, middlings include shorts (making up approximately 12% of the original grain, consisting of fractions of endosperm, bran, and germ with an average particle size of 500–900 microns) and red dog (actually a low-grade flour, making up approximately 3% of the original grain, consisting of fractions of endosperm and bran, with an average particle size of 100–300 microns).

The middlings include those portions of the wheat kernel that are richest in proteins, vitamins, lipids and minerals. For example, highly refined patent flour may contain only 10 to 12% of the total thiamine and niacin, 20% of the phosphorus, and 50% of the calcium of the parent grain.

== Classification inconsistencies ==
The term is somewhat imprecise, as it does not take into account the various mill streams and proportions that are combined and ultimately constitute the product's final composition. As a consequence of this inconsistent terminology, difficulties are encountered when ascertaining nutritional value and establishing economic worth. Wheat midds are sometimes referred to negatively as "floor sweepings" although such products are generally captured long before they would end up on the floor.

== Nonhuman consumption ==
When used in feed for livestock or horses, middlings can be a good source of protein, fiber, phosphorus, and other nutrients. Flour milling products arising from a fairly homogeneous parent grain can vary greatly depending on the objectives of the milling process. Thus, the degree of nutrient variation in wheat midds can be a major consideration in determining whether its inclusion in a ration or formula feed is beneficial. It has 96% of the energy value of barley and 91% of the energy value of corn. It is also used as an inexpensive filler for food for pets such as dogs and cats, who do not digest wheat products as readily.

== Fuels research ==
Due to its high energy content and low price, wheat middlings is being researched as a biofuel.

== Nutrition ==
Nutrient Value
Analysis	Percentage
Dry matter	89%
Crude protein	16.5%
Crude fiber	7.5%
Neutral detergent fiber	32%
