= List of British regional nicknames =

In addition to formal demonyms, many nicknames are used for residents of the different settlements and regions of the United Kingdom. For example, natives and residents of Liverpool are formally referred to as Liverpudlians, but are most commonly referred to as Scousers (after their local dish). Some, but not all, of these nicknames may be derogatory.

== A–B ==
Aberdeen : Donians (Aberdeen F. C. football team are nicknamed The Dons), Sheep-shaggers (pejorative)
Accrington : Akkies, Ringpieces (pejorative)
Acle : Asses
Alton : Brewers (after the former industry)
Aldbourne : Dabchicks

Arbroath : Red Lichties, Lichties, Codheids
Arundel : Mullets
Bacup : Buttercups,
Barnsley : Colliers,
Barnstaple : Barneys (pejorative when alluding to Barney Rubble of the Flintstones)
Barnoldswick : Barlickers
Belfast : McCooeys (from a radio series featuring a family of that name), Dunchers (refers to a type of cap)
Berwick-upon-Tweed: Tweedsiders, Wee Gers (from the football club, Berwick Rangers F. C.), Smacks (refers to a type of boat)
Bideford : Biddies, Little Whiteys (from the town's nickname “Little White Town”, falsely deprecated owing to apparent racist connotation)
Birkenhead : Birkos, One-eyes, Plastic Scousers (or Plazzies)
Birmingham : Brummies
Black Country : Yam Yams
Blackburn : Dodos
Blackpool : sandgronians,
Bognor Regis : Boggers, Bog Buggers (pejorative, alludes to the last words of King George V)
Bolton : Trotters (originally a football term, it is now used to describe anyone from Bolton and surrounding area), Noblot (collective noun, anagram for Bolton)
Bootle : Bootlickers, Bugs-in-Clogs
Bradford-on-Avon : Gudgeons
Bridgwater : Smellophaners
Bridport : Ropeys (after the former rope-making industry), Silly Bees (from the Bridport F. C. football club)
Brighton : Jugs (archaic),
Bristol : Brizzlies, Wurzels, Piss-tools (pejorative)
Britain : Limeys in Canada and the United States: Pommies in Australia and New Zealand: Les Rosbifs in France
Tommy, Island Monkey in Germany
Broadstairs : Bradstows (former name)
Buckie : Blethers, Tonics (from Buckfast Tonic Wine)
Burgess Hill : Buggers-Holes
Burnley : Dingles (pejorative, by people from other Lancashire towns, notably Blackburn. From a family in the Emmerdale soap opera, set in Yorkshire)
Bury : Shakers (originally a football term, it is now used to describe anyone from Bury and surrounding area)

== C–D ==
Caernarfon : Cofi
Caithness : Gallach
Calne : Lilywhites (from Calne Town F. C. football club), Sausages (from former industry)
Ceredigion : Cardi
Chatham : Chavs
Chesterfield : Spireites
Chippenham : Ham-and-Chips, Washbasins (from town nickname of Little Bath)
Cleethorpes : Meggies
Clevedon : Clefts
Colerne : Hoof-polishers
Congleton : Beartowners,
Copthorne : Yellow-bellies
Crawley : Creepy Crawlies, Insects
Darwen : Darreners (from old pronunciation)
Derby : Derbians
Dorset : Dorset Knobs (from the famous biscuit), Dumplings
Dumfries : Doonhamers, Queenies (after the Queen of the South F. C. football club)
Dundee : Coagies
Duns : Dingers

Durham : Pit-Yackers

== E–G ==
Eastbourne : Winnicks or Willicks (dialect name of a guillemot or wild person),
East Kilbride : Polo Mints (the town has too many roundabouts)
England : Sassenachs (used by Scottish and Irish: Anglicised form of the Scottish Gaelic word "Sasannach", meaning "Saxon"), Sassies, Red Coats, Inglish, Poms (Australia)
Epsom : Salts, Shitters (the spa water contains Epsom salts -a drastic purgative.
Essex : Essex Calves (archaic),
Exmouth : Sex-bots
Falkirk : Bairns
Fife : Fly Fifers, Canny Fifers (in reference to a supposed unscrupulous nature)
Forfar : Brosies, Loons (particularly Forfar Athletic supporters)
Fraserburgh : Brochers (not to be confused with people from Burghead), Puddlestinkers
Frinton-on-Sea : Master Gaters (pejorative: the town used to hide behind a set of railway crossing gates), Incontinents (from the old tag “Harwich for the Continent, Frinton for the Incontinent”)
Galashiels : Pail Merks, Pailies (from the claim that Gala was the last major town in Scotland to have plumbing or running water, and so used buckets as toilets)
Gateshead : Yakkers
Glasgow : Keelies, Weegies
Gosport : Turks
Great Harwood : Turbans (the town used to weave them)
Great Yarmouth : Yarcos
Guernsey : Les Ânes

== H–K ==
Hailsham : Stringers (from former rope and string industry)
Harpenden : Harps, Hard-ons (from old pronunciation “Harden”. Acronym HARPENDEN Hot And Randy Persons Enjoying Naked Delights Every Night)
Hartlepool : Poolies, Hartlepuddlians, Monkey Hangers
Harwich : Shrimpers (from the Harwich & Parkeston F. C. football club)
Haverfordwest : Long-necks
Hawick : Teris
Haydock : Yickers
Hazel Grove : Bullocks (the original name was Bullock Smithy),
Hertford : Her-farts
Heswall : Hezzies
Hexham : Birnies
Heywood : Monkeys
Highlands and Islands (of Scotland) : Teuchters
Hinckley : Tin Hatters
Inverness : Sneckies
Isle of Wight : Caulkhead
Jarrow : Jarrovians
Jedburgh : Jetharts, Jeddarts, Jobbies
Jersey : Les Crapauds
Kilbarchan : Habbies
Kent : Long-Tails

== L ==
Lancaster, Lancashire : Lancastrians
Lauder : Lousies
Leeds : Loiners
Leicestershire : Rat-eyes, Chisits, Beanbellys, Leicesterites
Leigh : Leythers, Lobby Gobblers (from lobby)
Lincolnshire : Yellow Bellies(after pool frogs once common in the Lincolnshire and East Anglian Fens)
Linlithgow : Black Bitches, from the burgh coat of arms
Littlehampton : LA, from the local accent being unable to pronounce the 'h' in Hampton
Liverpool : Lillipudlian, Liverpoliton, Scousers (from the stew known as scouse),
Plastic Scousers or Plazzies (a person who falsely claims to be from Liverpool)
Woolybacks or Wools (a person from the surrounding areas of Liverpool, especially St Helens, Warrington, Widnes, or the Wirral)<
Llanelli : Turks
London : Cockneys (Traditionally those born within the sound of the bells of St Mary-le-Bow, Cheapside), Londoners
Lossiemouth : Codheids, Gollachs (meaning an earwig)
Lowestoft : Puds
Luton : Hatters, Looneys, Harpic Dodgers (pejorative, equating the town to a toilet -a brand of one named after the town does exist, made by Johnson Suisse)

== M–N ==
Macclesfield : Maxies,
Mansfield : Mannies, Stags, Deer Botherers, Scabs - offensive, linked to the divisions during the UK miners' strike (1984–1985).
Malmesbury : Jackdaws, Smarmies, Marmites
Market Drayton : Gingerbread Men (from the Market Drayton Town F.C. football club, which itself is due to the towns Gingerbread industry)
Middlesbrough : Smoggies.
Middleton : Moonrakers, Piddly Middlies (pejorative)
Morecambe : Sandgronians
Nantwich : Dabbers,
Newcastle-under-Lyme : Not-pots (no pottery industry there, and the town has denied any connection with Stoke)
Newcastle upon Tyne : Geordies
Newquay : Peppermints (from the Newquay A.F.C. football club), Blisters (from the old Cornish name of Towan Blystra)
Norfolk : Norfolk Dumplings ("Dumplings being a favourite food in that county"),
North Wales : Gogs North Walians
Northampton : Cobblers
Nuneaton: Codders, Treacle Towners

== O–R ==
Oswaldtwistle : Gobbins (but only "above the lamp")
Padiham : Thick Necks
Paisley : Buddies
Peacehaven : Plotters,
Peterhead : Bluemogganers, Blue Tooners
Plymouth : Janners. Originally a person who spoke with a Devon accent, now simply any West Countryman. In naval slang (where the place is referred to as Guz), this is specifically a person from Plymouth.
Portsmouth : Pompey (collective, shared by the city, the naval base and the football club), Skates (pejorative, alluding to frustrated sailors raping skates)
Reedham : Rats
Rochdale : Bulldogs,
Rye :Mudlarks

== S ==
St Albans : Snorbennies,
St Helens : Nellies, Woollybacks
Scotland : Scotties, Jocks, Macs, Sweaties (offensive: from rhyming slang "Sweaty Sock" for Jock).
Seaford : Shags (alludes to the bird, not the act)
Selkirk : Souters
Shaw : Gorbies
Sheffield : Dee Dars, North Midlanders, Steelmekkers
Skye : Sgitheanachs
Slough : Sluffers, Paludians (Latin: Slough means "marsh")
South Shields : Sand dancers
Stoke-on-Trent : Potters, Clay Heads, Jug Heads
Sunderland : Mackems
Sutherland : Cattach
Swansea : Jacks

== T–V ==
Tarbert, Kintyre : Dookers
Tideswell : Tidsas
Torquay : Orcs
Totnes : Tot-Ness-Monsters
Trowbridge : Knobs
Upavon : Jacks

== W ==
Wales : Taffs [Mid/West Welsh] (sometimes considered offensive), Taffies.
Walsall : Saddlers
Warrington : Wirepullers (after the local wire industry), Wazzas, Wires, Woolybacks or Wools (in Liverpool)
Wednesfield : Wedgies,
West Bromwich : Baggies
Westhoughton : Keawyeds or Cowheads
Whitehaven : Jam Eater, Marra
Wick : Durdy Weekers, Wickers
Wigan : Pie-eaters
Wiltshire : Moonrakers
Worthing : Pork Bolters

== Y ==
York : Yorkies
Yorkshire : Tykes, Yorkies

== See also ==
- List of regional nicknames
- Lists of nicknames – nickname list articles on Wikipedia
- Demonym
