= Scouse (food) =

Meat and vegetable stew from Liverpool, England

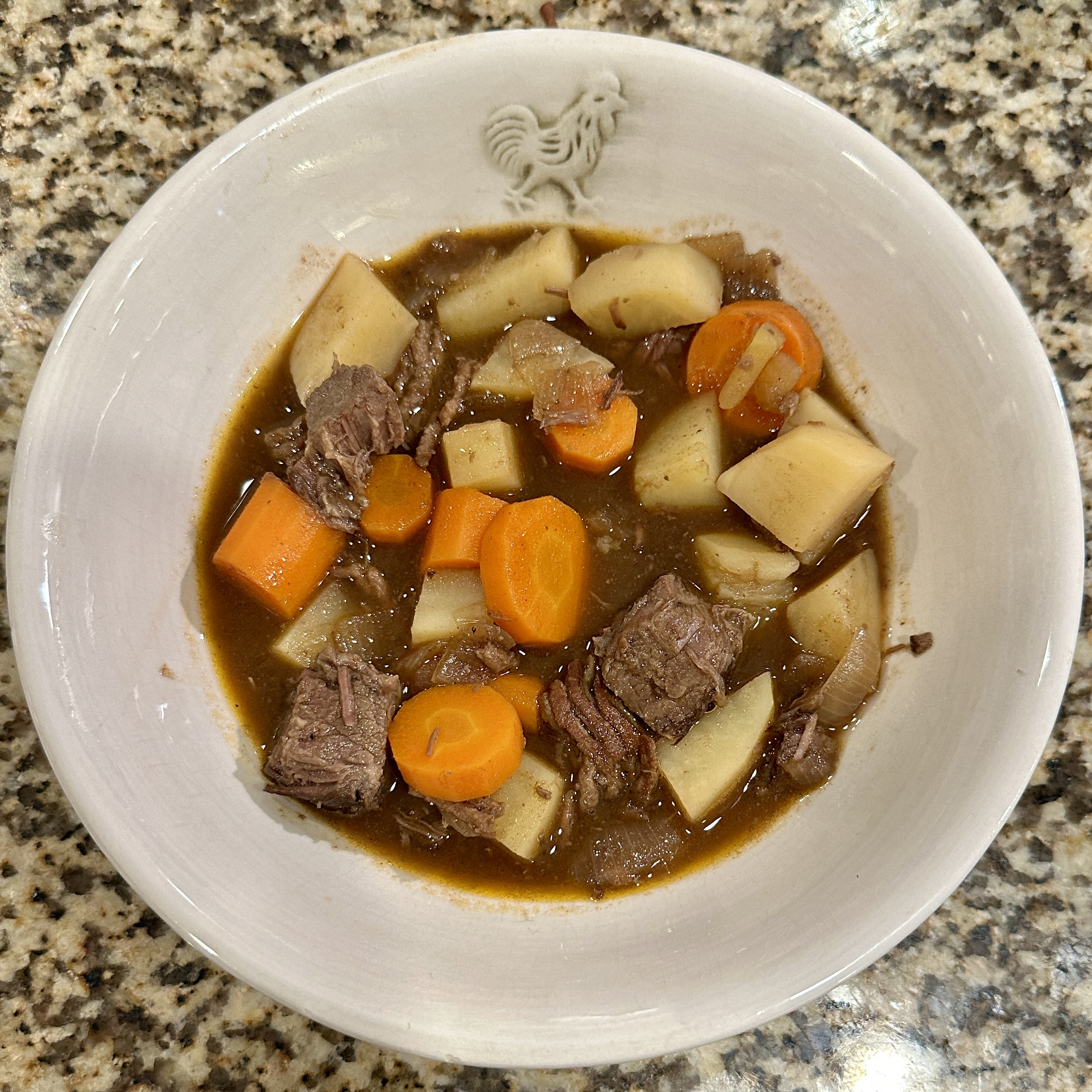
- Type: Stew
- Region or state: Liverpool, England
- Main ingredients: Meat (beef or lamb), potatoes, carrots, onions

Scouse is a type of stew typically made from meat (usually beef or lamb) with potatoes, carrots, and onions. It is particularly associated with the city of Liverpool, to the extent that the Liverpool accent is also widely referred to as "Scouse" and locals as "Scousers". The word scouse comes from lobscouse, a dish of meat and ships biscuit commonly eaten by Northern European sailors, and which survives in different forms there today.

== Description ==
The food writer Felicity Cloake describes scouse as being similar to Irish stew or Lancashire hotpot, though generally using beef rather than lamb. Although ingredients can vary, the essentials are potatoes, carrots, onions and diced meat, gently simmered together.

A survey by The Liverpool Echo in 2018 confirmed that for the majority of cooks the basic ingredients are potatoes, carrots, onion and chunks of meat, though many advocated the addition of a stock cube, and a few also added other ingredients, such as peas, lentils or sweet potato, and herbs including rosemary, parsley and basil. The choice of meat varied: some cooks did not stipulate a particular meat; among those who did, beef was chosen rather than lamb by a majority of nearly two to one. (Note: A small minority used pork or tofu.)

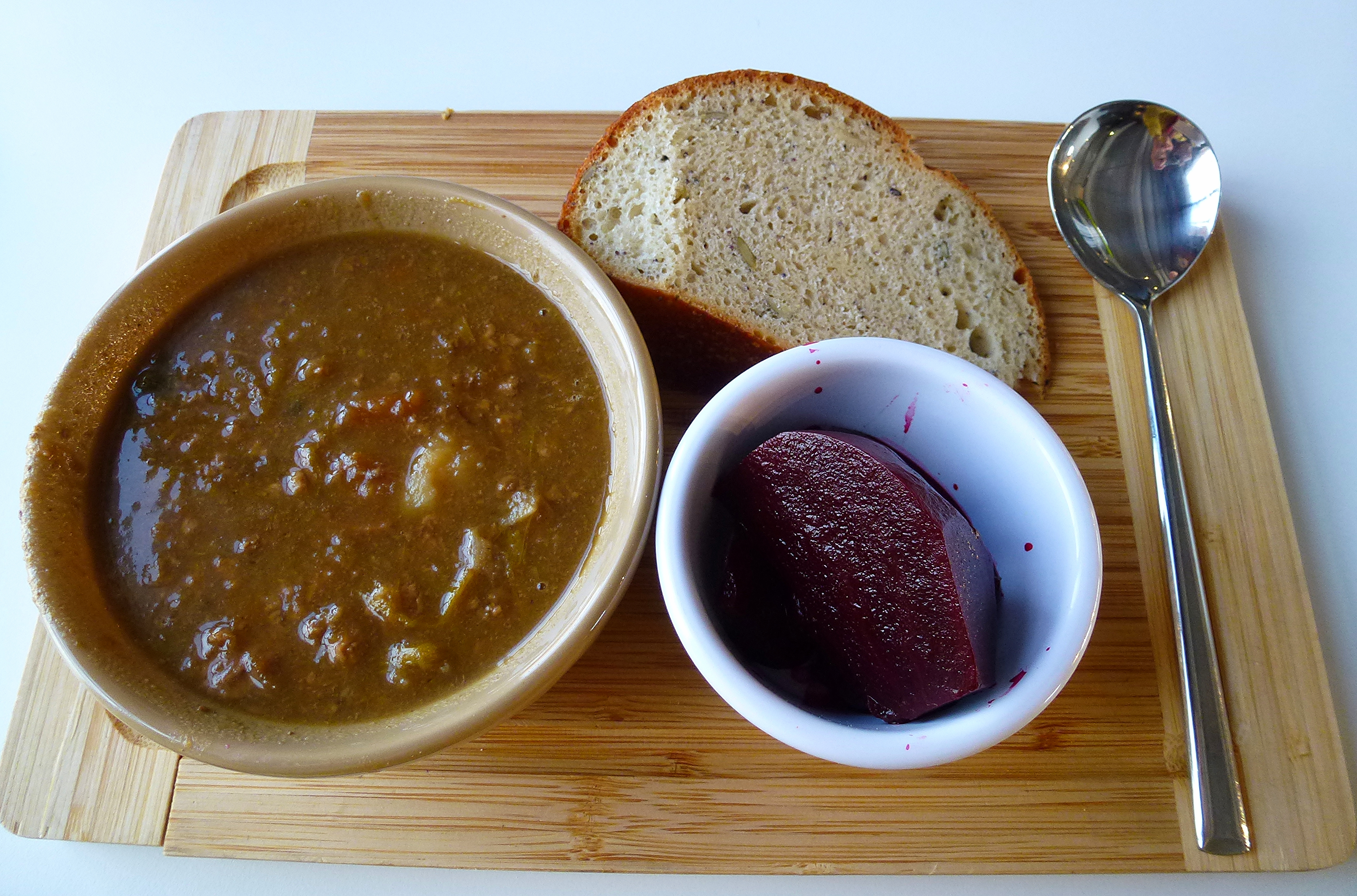
A dish of scouse, with beetroot and crusty bread.

Although some argue that anything other than beef, potatoes, carrots, and onion is not scouse, others observe that, as a thrift dish, scouse will contain "whatever veg you had [and] the cheapest cuts of meat". Some recipes suggest including marrowbones to thicken the stew. Proportions of ingredients vary, from equal amounts of meat and vegetables to a 1:5 proportion between meat and potato. A meatless version, known as "blind scouse", is also recorded, for people who could not afford meat – and latterly for vegetarians. Scouse is often served with pickled red cabbage or beetroot and crusty bread.

== Origin ==
Scouse is strongly associated with the city of Liverpool and its hinterland in the north-west of England. Other parts of the country were slower to begin growing potatoes, but they were cultivated in Lancashire from the late 17th century onwards. By the late 18th century a potato-based lobscouse had become a traditional dish of the region. A reference from 1785 refers to "lobs-couse, a dish much eaten at sea, composed of salt beef, ship's biscuit, and onions, well peppered and stewed together". A 1797 description records that potatoes were:

peeled, or rather scraped, raw; chopped, and boiled together with a small quantity of meat cut into very small pieces. The whole of this mixture is then formed into a hash, with pepper, salt, onions, etc., and forms a cheap and nutritive dish".

A similar recipe was used by nineteenth-century sailors, and such dishes are traditional in countries around the North Sea, such as Norway (lapskaus), Sweden (lapskojs), Finland (lapskoussi), Denmark, (skipperlabskovs), and northern Germany (Labskaus).

== Etymology ==
Edward Ward's reference to "lobscouse", 24 November 1706

The Oxford English Dictionary (OED) states that scouse is a shortened form of lobscouse, the oldest citation for which in the OED is by the satirist Edward Ward (1706). Tobias Smollett refers to lob's course in 1750. The roots of the word are unknown. The OED's earliest citation for the shortened form scouse dates from 1840. In the twentieth century the terms scouse and scouser began to be applied to Liverpudlians.

According to The Oxford Companion to Food, lobscouse "almost certainly has its origins in the Baltic ports, especially those of Germany". However, the German philologist Friedrich Kluge dates its first appearance in German in 1878, and concludes that the usage spread from Britain to northern Europe rather than vice versa. Kluge asserts that the origin of the word is unknown, and that it was loaned to German in the 19th century, where it was called labskaus. There are similar terms in Norwegian, Danish, Latvian and Lithuanian. (Note: Hjalmar Falk and Alf Torp state that lobscous originally was lob's course from a lob (a lump) and course (a dish) and that the word has travelled to Norwegian as lapskaus and Danish as lobskous. The similarities with labs kauss in Latvian and labas kaušas in Lithuanian is called gobbledygook (Kauderwelsch) of the mind in Der Spiegel by Petra Foede. Foede translates Labs kausis to means a "good plate" in Latvian, and says that in Lithuanian they use labas káuszas for a "good plate". According to Gerhard Bauer káuszas in Lithuanian means a wooden ladle or dipper or a wooden drinking bowl and is the same word as Lettish kauśis and this Baltic word has been adopted in German as Kausche or Kauszel which means wooden jug, pitcher or drinking bowl. Konrad Reich claims that Labskaus stems from a combination of Lappen, Lappenstücke or Bauchlappen from the pig and a Low German word Kaus which he explains as a plate or platter and concludes that Labskaus is a paraphrase for a plate of minced pork.)

By the mid-19th century the term lobscouse had been shortened to scouse in Liverpudlian usage. In his book The State of the Poor: or a History of the Labouring Classes in England (1797), Sir Frederick Eden cites a report from the early 1790s listing expenditure on food in the Liverpool poorhouse. It included "Beef, 101 lbs. [46 kg] for scouse … 14 Measures potatoes for scouse [420 lb or 190 kg]; and Onions for ditto [28 lb or 13 kg]".

== Variations ==
Lobscouse is also remembered in other parts of the country. In the Potteries, a similar stew is known as "lobby", and people from Leigh, Greater Manchester, are known as "lobby-gobblers". In North Wales the full form is retained as "lobsgows" (Welsh: lapsgóws). A version of scouse has been known on the Atlantic coast of Canada in Newfoundland and Labrador, from at least 1792. It is described as a sea dish of minced and salted beef, crumbled sea biscuit, potatoes and onions.

== Global Scouse Day ==
Since 2000 there has been an annual Global Scouse Day held, where bars, cafés and restaurants in Liverpool put scouse on the menu for the day, raising funds for charities.

== See also ==
- Cawl
- List of lamb dishes
- List of stews
- Scotch broth
- Kaldereta
- List of meat and potato dishes

== Sources ==
- Clarke, Sandra (2010). Newfoundland and Labrador English. Edinburgh: Edinburgh University Press. ISBN 978-0-7486-3141-4.
- Crowley, Tony (2012). Scouse: A Social and Cultural History. Liverpool: Liverpool University Press. ISBN 978-1-84631-839-9.
- Crowley, Tony (2017). The Liverpool English Dictionary: A Record of the Language of Liverpool 1850–2015. Oxford: Oxford University Press. ISBN 978-1-78694-061-2.
- Draper, Charla (2001). Cooking on Nineteenth Century Whaling Ships. Mankato Minnesota: Blue Earth Books. ISBN 978-0-7368-0602-2.
- Falk, Hjalmar; Alf Torp (1903). "Hug". Etymologisk Ordbog over det norske og det danske Sprog (in Norwegian). Kristiania: Aschehoug. OCLC 312783058.
- Grose, Frances (1785). A Classical Dictionary of The Vulgar Tongue. London: S. Hooper.
- Kluge, Friedrich (1989). "Labskaus". Etymologisches Wörterbuch der deutschen Sprache (in German) (22 ed.). Berlin and New York: de Gruyter. doi:10.1515/9783110845037. ISBN 978-3-11-006800-9. S2CID 62272098.
- Pike, Edgar Royston (2014). Human Documents of Adam Smith's Time. London: Routledge. ISBN 978-1-135-17509-2.
- Reich, Conrad; Martin Pagel (1988). Himmelsbesen über weißen Hunden (in German). Rostock: Reich. ISBN 978-3-86167-030-8.
- Shipperbottom, Roy (2014) [1999]. "lobscouse". In Davidson, Alan (ed.). The Oxford Companion to Food (third ed.). Oxford: Oxford University Press. ISBN 978-0-19-104072-6.
- Wilson, C. Anne (1991). Food & Drink in Britain: From the Stone Age to the 19th Century. London: Constable. ISBN 978-0-09-470760-3.
- Zuckerman, Larry (1998). The Potato: How the Humble Spud Rescued the Western World. Boston: Faber and Faber. ISBN 0-57-119951-8.
