= List of meat and potato dishes =

This is a list of notable dishes whose primary ingredients include meat and potatoes.

== Dishes ==
Dish	Image	Culinary origins	Type	Description
Aloo gosht		South Asia	stew	Curry consisting of potatoes (aloo) cooked with meat (gosht), usually lamb, mutton or beef, in a shorba gravy
Baeckeoffe		Alsace	casserole	Braised meat, onions and potatoes
Bangers and mash		Great Britain	pairing	Traditional pairing of sausages and mashed potato, usually served with onion gravy and often with fried onions and peas
Bedfordshire clanger		South Midlands	pie	Traditional meat, potato, and onion hand pie made with a suet crust; some versions include a sweet filling at one end
Brændende kærlighed		Denmark	pairing	Traditional dish consisting of mashed potatoes topped with bacon and fried onions
Carne asada fries		California	compilation	A Mexican-American dish typically consisting of french fries topped with carne asada, guacamole, sour cream, cheese, and sometimes salsa
Carne de porco à alentejana		Portugal	stew	Traditional dish consisting of pork and clams served with potatoes
Chorrillana		Chile	compilation	French fries topped with sliced meat or sausages and often eggs and caramelized onions
Coddle		Ireland	soup or stew	Sliced pork sausages and rashers cooked with potatoes and onion; traditionally may also include barley
Corned beef pie		United Kingdom	pie	Corned beef, onion and often sliced or cubed potatoes baked in a pie that may be topped with mashed potatoes, as in Shepherd's pie, or with a traditional pastry crust
Halal snack pack		Australia	compilation	Halal-certified doner kebab meat (lamb, chicken, or beef) and chips
Hash		Multiple	sautee	Any of a number of dishes in a variety of cuisines which feature meat, generally left over from a previous meal, and cubed or grated potatoes sauteed together, sometimes with other vegetables
Irish stew		Ireland	stew	Traditionally lamb or mutton, potatoes, onions, and often carrots in a thick broth
Kapsalon		Netherlands	compilation	French fries topped with döner, shawarma or gyro meat and Gouda cheese, broiled until the cheese melts, and further topped with shredded iceberg lettuce and sauces
Labskaus		Northern Europe	thick stew	Salted meat or corned beef, potatoes, and onion
Lancashire hotpot		North West England	thick stew or casserole	Mutton or lamb and onions topped with sliced potato and covered with broth, slowly baked in a covered pot
Lobby		North Staffordshire, England	stew	a traditional stew or casserole, containing beef, vegetables, and pearl barley.
Lobscouse		Northern Europe	stew	Typically beef or lamb, but sometimes also chicken, pork, or ham and potatoes, often stewed with other vegetables
Meat and potato pie		England	pie	A pastry casing containing potato, either lamb or beef, and sometimes carrot and/or onion.
Mince and tatties		Scotland	pairing	Minced beef cooked with onions, carrots or other root vegetables, and stock, sometimes with a thickening agent such as flour, oatmeal or cornflour, served with or over mashed potatoes
Nikujaga		Japan	braise or stew	Beef or pork, potatoes, and onions stewed in a dashi-based broth, sometimes with ito konnyaku and vegetables, until most of the liquid has been reduced
Papa rellena		South America	croquette	A potato-based dough which is filled with chopped beef and onions, olives, and hard-boiled eggs, then deep-fried
Pichelsteiner		Germany	stew	A stew that contains several kinds of meat and vegetables.
Poutine râpée		Acadia	dumpling	Typically consists of a boiled potato dumpling with a pork filling; it is usually prepared with a mixture of grated and mashed potato.
Pyttipanna		Scandinavia	sautee	Chopped or minced meat such as sausage, ham, or meatballs, diced and then pan fried, often served with a fried egg and pickled vegetables
Raspeball		Norway	dumpling	The main ingredient is peeled potatoes, which are grated or ground up and mixed with flour, usually barley or wheat, to make the balls stick together. Often served for dinner with salted lamb meat and sausage.
Revuelto Gramajo		Argentina	sautee	Fried julienned potatoes, ham and eggs
Rössypottu		Finland	stew	Potatoes, pork, and blodpalt, a dumpling made of blood, beer, and rye flour
Salchipapa		Latin America	compilation	Typically thinly sliced pan-fried beef sausages and French fries, mixed together with a savory coleslaw on the side.
Scouse		Liverpool	stew	Typically beef or lamb, but sometimes also chicken, pork, or ham and potatoes, often stewed with other vegetables
Shepherd's pie		Britain and France	pie or casserole	Meat and vegetables covered with mashed potato and baked
Slinger		St. Louis, Missouri	compilation	Eggs, hash browns, and a ground beef patty, covered in chili con carne, cheese and onions
Sodd		Norway	soup	Mutton with beef or lamb meatballs, potatoes and other vegetables in a clear broth
Spice bag		Ireland	compilation	French fries topped with salt and chilli chicken and vegetables
Steak frites		Belgium	pairing	Beef steak paired with fried potatoes
Stegt flæsk		Denmark	pairing	Fried pork belly served with potatoes and parsley sauce
Tourtière		French Canada	pie	Pork, veal, beef, fish, or game and potatoes
Trinxat		Catalonia and Andorra	sautee	Potatoes, cabbage and pork
Xogoi Momo		Tibet	dumpling	Potato dough with a minced meat filling

== Idiom ==
In US English, the idiomatic term "meat and potatoes" describes something that is fundamental or unpretentious.

== See also ==
- Fish and chips
- List of meat dishes
- List of potato dishes
- Rice and beans
