= Global Scouse Day =

Annual celebration of the city of Liverpool, England

Global Scouse Day is an annual celebration of the city of Liverpool which is held every year on 28 February. It is primarily based around scouse, the meat stew synonymous with the city. It sees bars, cafes and restaurants in Liverpool and around the world put scouse on the menu for the day. Scouse is also served in Liverpool schools, hospitals, and on Virgin trains nationwide.

== Origins ==
In March 2000, the inaugural "International Scouse Day" was held to celebrate Scouse culture and raise money for the Alder Hey Rocking Horse Appeal. In 2004, it was marked by a poll commissioned to find the "UK's favourite Scouser", with footballer Wayne Rooney coming in first place.

In 2008, the event was reportedly revived by Liverpudlian Graham Hughes, under the name Global Scouse day and held on 28 February.

Over the course of the following years, Global Scouse Day grew with over 100 bars, restaurants and cafes putting scouse on the menu on 28 February, and saw support from the Lord Mayor of Liverpool as well as Liverpool F.C. and Everton F.C.

== Events ==
Global Scouse Day has spawned various events including an annual "Scouse Off" competition, adjudicated over by Liverpool celebrities, a cocktail competition and at least one Guinness World Record attempt. In 2018, Liverpool writer and poet Roger McGough wrote and performed a humorous poem about the day, musing on the ingredients that could be used to make scouse in different countries around the world.

== Charity ==
Global Scouse Day has been used to raise funds and awareness for R Charity, The Whitechapel Centre, Clatterbridge Cancer Centre, and to provide hot, nutritious food to the city's homeless. In 2018, Virgin Trains provided 100 bowls of scouse to the Whitechapel Centre, a homeless charity based in Liverpool.
