= Chi Chi (restaurant) =

Restaurant in Palm Springs, California, U.S.

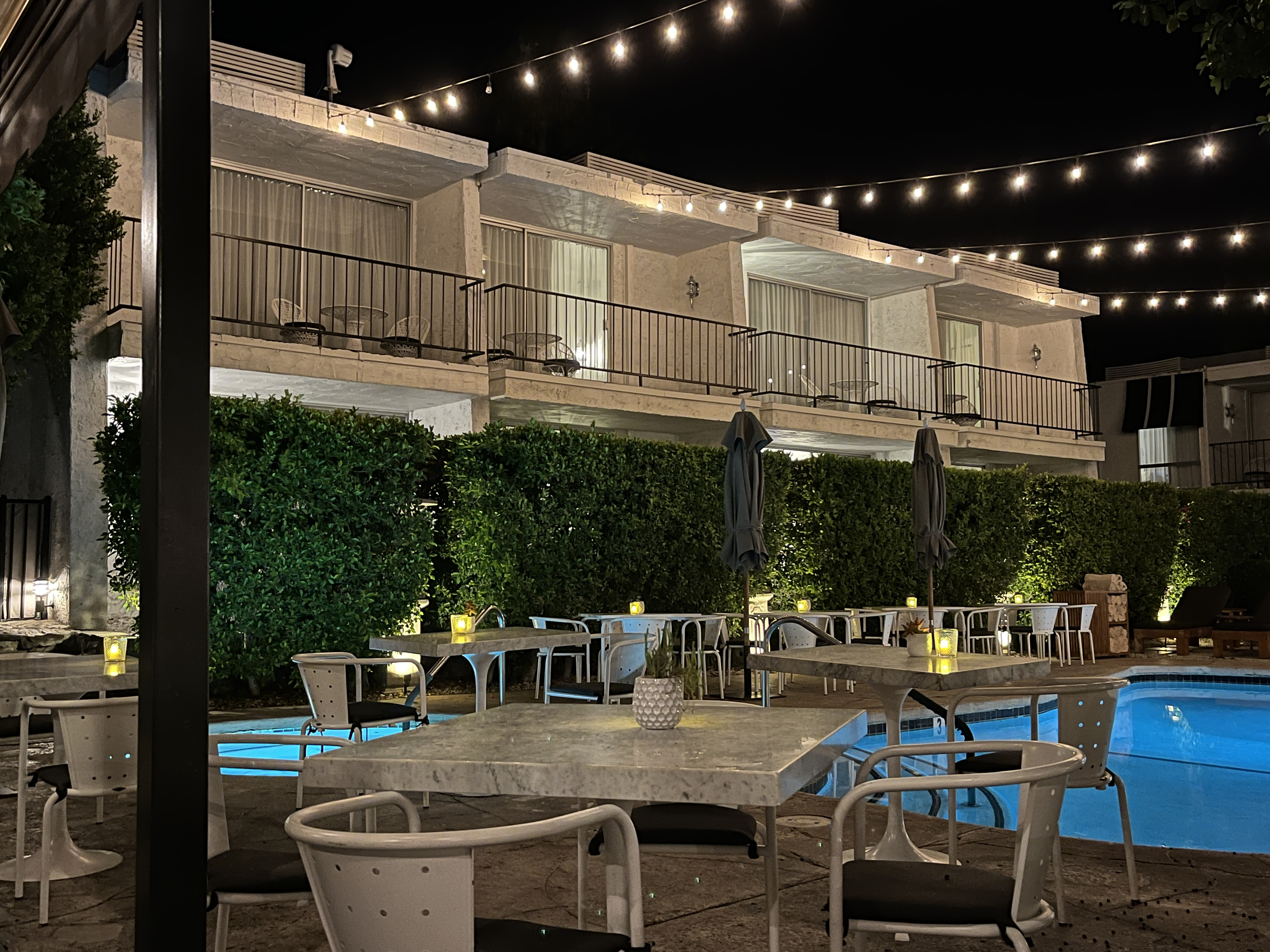
- Restaurant seating by the hotel's pool, 2024
- Interactive map of Chi Chi

Restaurant information
- Food type: Latin American
- Location: Palm Springs, California, United States
- Coordinates: 33.8175°N 116.5481°W

Chi Chi (sometimes Chi-Chi) is a Latin American restaurant at Hotel Avalon in Palm Springs, California. Operated by restaurateur Tara Lazar, the restaurant has indoor and poolside seating.

== Description ==
Chi Chi serves breakfast, lunch, and dinner, and has a lobby bar with signature cocktails. The Michelin Guide described the restaurant as a "chameleon-like Cali-Latin eatery morphing from daytime casual bites to a cocktail-driven gourmet experience at nightfall". The Daily Bulletin described the food as "Mexican regional fare with some Peruvian overtones" and said: "Black, gray and white marble accents with lots of greenery and hanging straw lamps provide a chic romantic ambiance in the patio-covered area, which is quieter than the al fresco dining area."

The food has also been described as "soulful Latin standards with a dash of cheeky California wellness", and as "flavorful California fare". The brunch menu has included Eggs Benedict with smoked salmon, a hash with pork belly, and brioche French toast.

== Reception ==
Fodor's called the restaurant "stylish". Business Insider said the food is "worth a try" and recommended the açaí bowl for breakfast.
