= Mince and tatties =

Scottish dish made from beef and potato

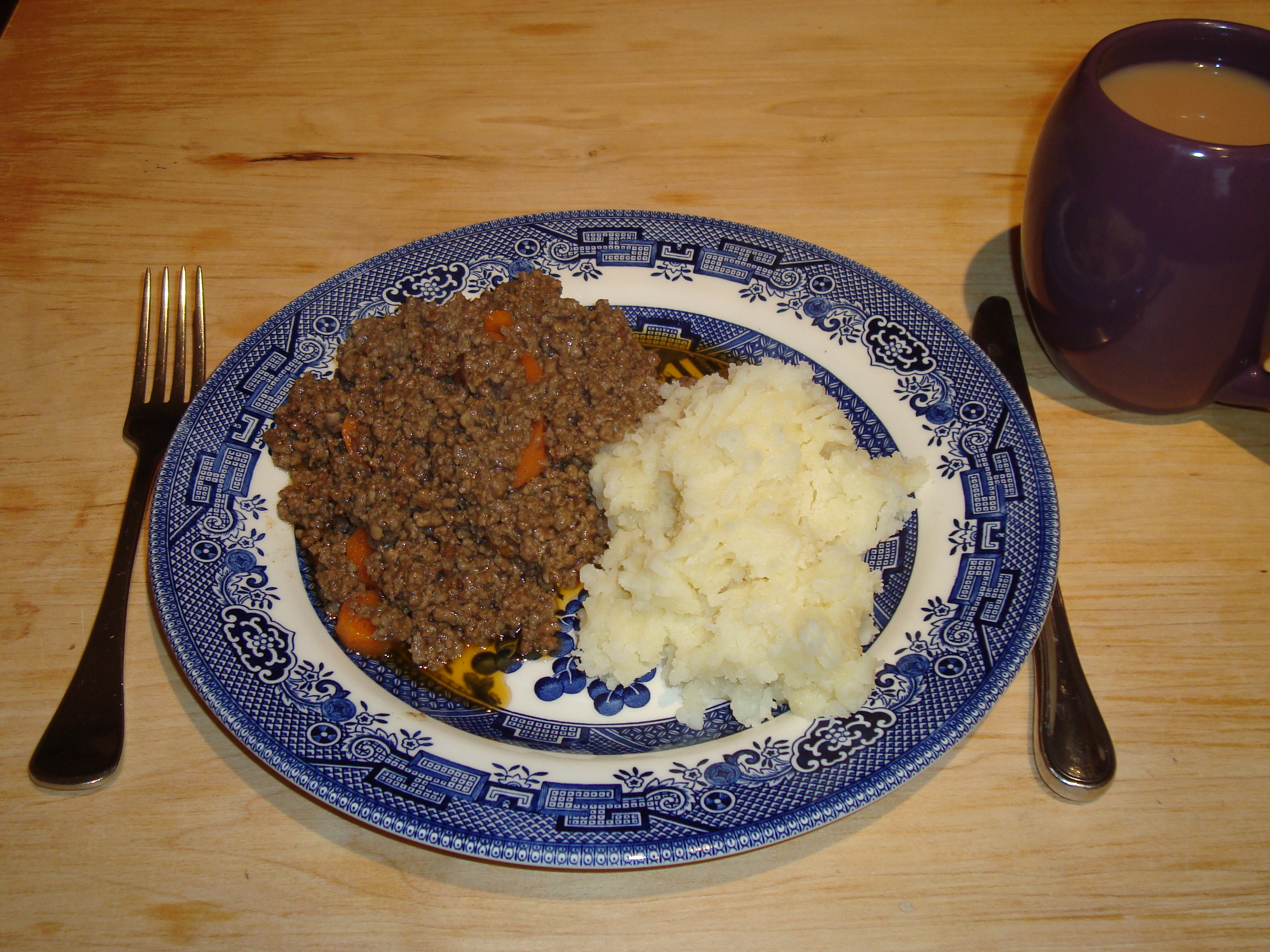
- A plate of mince and tatties
- Course: Main course
- Place of origin: Scotland
- Serving temperature: Hot
- Main ingredients: Minced beef, mashed potatoes
- Ingredients generally used: Onions, carrots, flour, oatmeal, other root vegetables

Mince and tatties is a Scottish dish which consists of minced beef and mashed potato. Other vegetables or thickening agents are sometimes added to the dish as well. It was frequently served as part of school meals in Scotland during the 20th century.

== Preparation ==
There is no set recipe or form of cooking and large variations can occur from cook to cook. Essentially the dish consists of varying amounts of minced beef, onions, carrots or other root vegetables, seasoning and stock. Some cooks add thickening agents such as flour, oatmeal or cornflour.

== History ==
Despite concerns that British people are no longer eating traditional dishes, mince and tatties remains popular in Scotland. A survey by the Scottish Daily Express in 2009 found that it was the most popular Scottish dish, with a third of respondents saying that they eat mince and tatties once a week. This placed it above other dishes such as smoked salmon, haggis, Scotch pies and Scotch broth. An annual competition is held in Tobermory on the Isle of Mull to determine the best mince and tatties.

Mince and tatties is well known for being used historically in school canteens, where the quality of the ingredients and the ability to feed a large number of children made it popular. In recent years, there have been attempts by some to modernise the dish, which resulted in it appearing on Time Out magazine's list of the top 100 dishes available in London in 2012. The version from the Dean Street Townhouse restaurant placed on the best of British section of the list.

== See also ==
- List of beef dishes
- List of potato dishes
- List of meat and potato dishes
