= Cawl =

Traditional Welsh soup

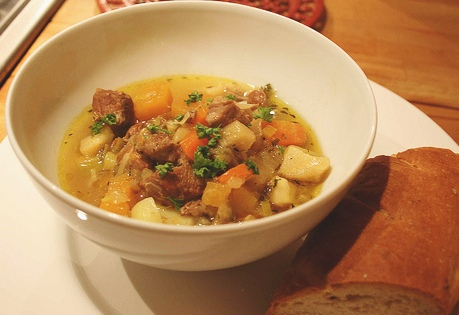
- Cawl with unthickened stock
- Type: Broth
- Place of origin: Wales
- Main ingredients: Potatoes, swedes, carrots, leeks, meat

Cawl (Welsh: [kaʊ̯l]) is a Welsh dish. In modern Welsh, the word is used for any soup or broth; in English, it refers to a traditional Welsh soup, usually called cawl Cymreig ('Welsh soup') in Welsh. Historically, ingredients tended to vary, but the most common recipes are lamb or beef with leeks, potatoes, swedes, carrots and other seasonal vegetables. Cawl is recognised as a national dish of Wales.

== History ==
With recipes dating back to the fourteenth century and prehistoric culinary roots, cawl is widely considered to be the de facto national dish of Wales. Cawl was traditionally eaten during the winter months in the south-west of Wales. Today, the word is often used to refer to a dish containing lamb and leeks, due to their association with Welsh culture, but historically, it was made with either salted bacon or beef, along with swedes, carrots, and other seasonal vegetables. With the introduction of the potato into Welsh cuisine in the later half of the 18th century, it became a core ingredient in the recipe as well.

The meat in the dish was normally cut into medium-sized pieces and simmered with the vegetables in water. The stock was thickened with either oatmeal or flour and was then served, without the meat or vegetables, as a first course. The vegetables and slices of the meat would then be served as a second course.

== Variations ==
Its North Wales equivalent is Lobsgows, which differs in that the meat and vegetables were cut into smaller pieces, and the stock was not thickened. It is served as a single course, which is the most popular way to serve Cawl today.

"Cawl cennin", or leek cawl, can be made without meat but using meat stock. In some areas cawl is often served with bread and cheese. These are served separately on a plate. The dish was traditionally cooked in an iron pot or cauldron over the fire and eaten with wooden spoons.

== Etymology ==
The word cawl in Welsh is first recorded in the 14th century, and is thought to come from the Latin caulis, meaning the stalk of a plant, a cabbage stalk or a cabbage. An alternative suggestion is that it is from Latin calidus, sometimes already in Classical Latin shortened to caldus, meaning "warm", as this is the source of Spanish caldo, with the senses of broth or gravy. The second suggestion seems more likely because of the sense, but in favour of the first theory, it is true that one of the reflexes of Latin AU can be AW in Welsh, while the short A of calidus would normally give A.

Lobsgows is related etymologically to the English Lobscouse, a kind of cheap stew made from local ingredients; figuratively lobsgows can mean a "hodge-podge", a jumble, a mess.

== See also ==
- Fårikål
- Irish stew
- Lancashire hotpot
- List of lamb dishes
- Scotch broth
- Scouse
