= Hash (food) =

Dish of meat, potatoes, and fried onions

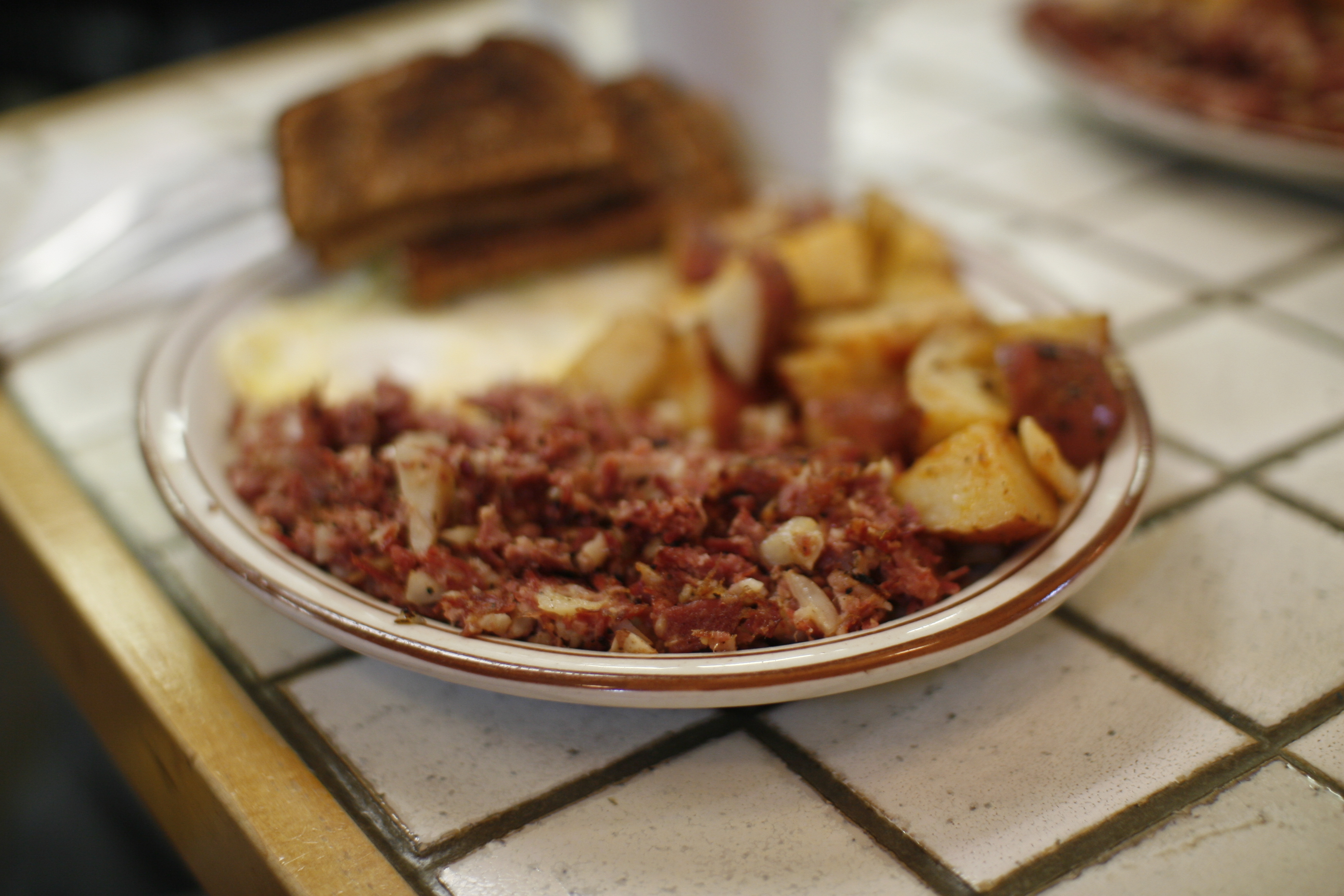
An order of corned beef hash for breakfast

Hash is a dish consisting of chopped meat, potatoes, and fried onions. The name is derived from French hacher, meaning 'to chop'.

Canned corned beef hash became especially popular in countries such as Britain and France during and after the Second World War as rationing limited the availability of fresh meat.

Hash may be served for breakfast, lunch, or supper. When served for breakfast in the United States, hash may come with eggs, toast, hollandaise sauce, or baked beans.

High-end restaurants offer sophisticated hash dishes on their menus. Modern preparations have been made with unconventional ingredients, such as lamb, fish, venison, turkey, chicken, shrimp, steak or vegetables.

== United States ==
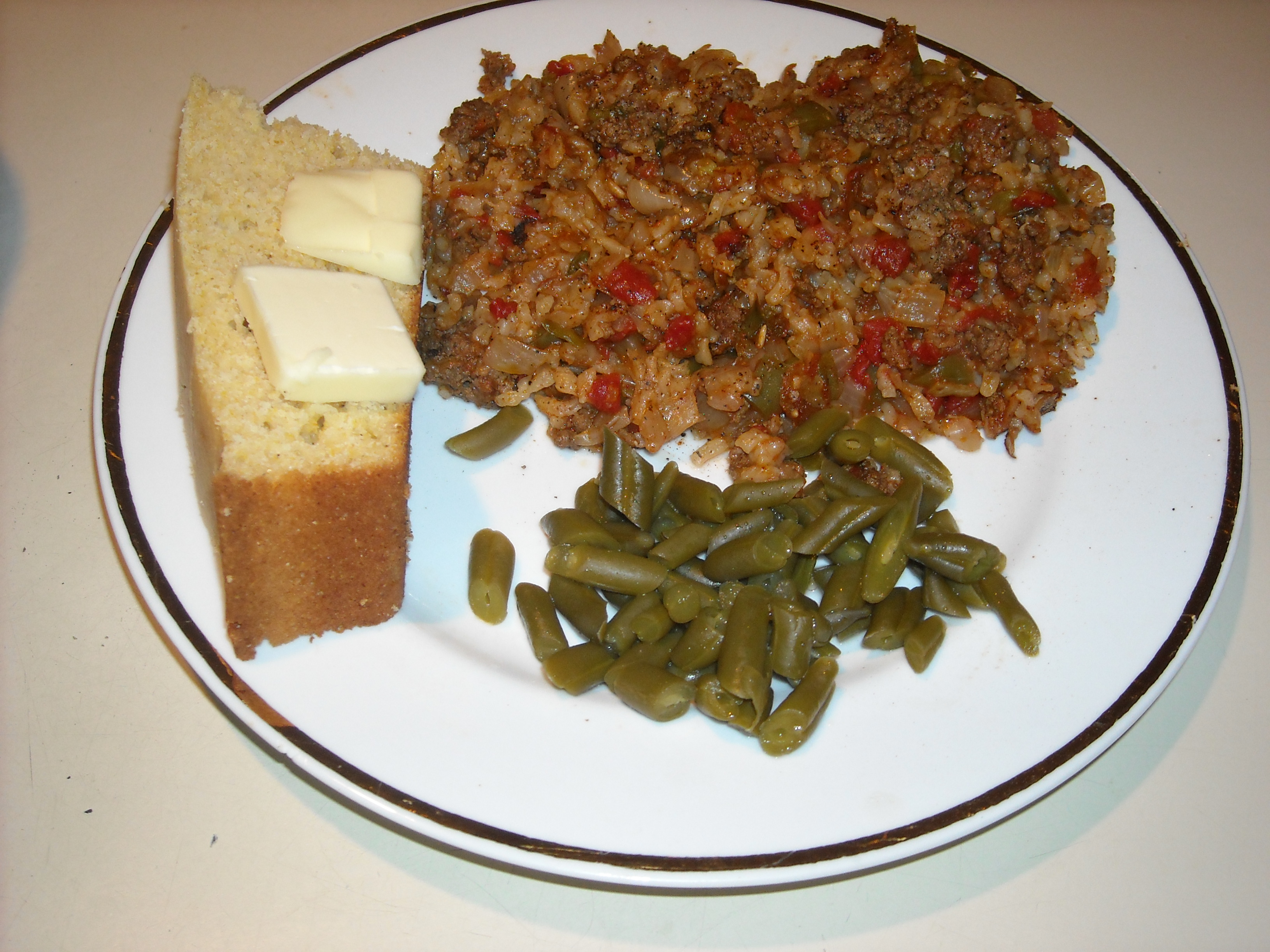
Texas hash with cornbread and green beans

"Hash" of many forms was part of the American diet since at least the 18th century, as is attested by the availability of numerous recipes and the existence of many "hash houses" named after the dish. In the United States, September 27 is "National Corned Beef Hash Day".

Classic American corned beef hash originated in the New England region of the United States as a way to use up the remainders from a traditional boiled dinner of beef, cabbage, potatoes, and onions. A red flannel hash is made with the addition of beets. Fish hash, including salt cod hash, has been observed in historical New England cuisine.

Corned beef and cabbage dinners are an Irish-American tradition from the 1800s that are now commonly held across the United States on St. Patrick's Day. Corned beef hash is also commonly served on St. Patrick's Day, as well as around American Thanksgiving and Christmas.

In the Midwest it was common to bind a hash together with a white sauce thickened with flour.

Alternatively, in the southern United States, the term hash may refer to two dishes:

- A Southern traditional stew of pork and offal served over rice.
- In Texas, a thick stew made up of pork, chicken and beef, traditionally seasoned with salt and pepper and other spices, is reduced overnight over an open flame in an iron washpot or hashpot.

== United Kingdom ==
As early as the 14th century, English people were making hache or hachy. According to cookbook author Steven Raichlen, "The English diarist Samuel Pepys waxed grandiloquent about a rabbit hash he savored in 1662".

An 18th-century recipe for "excellent hash" was made by preparing a seasoned roux with herbs and onion, cayenne, mace and nutmeg, then adding to it broth or gravy and stirring in mushroom ketchup. In this sauce the cold beef would be simmered over gentle heat. Simpler recipes would omit some of the fancier ingredients like mushroom ketchup and add filling root vegetables like carrots and boiled potatoes.

"Norman hash" was a dish of gravy and onions served over slices of leftover roast beef.

== Other countries ==
Hash in Denmark, known in Danish as biksemad (roughly translated, 'tossed-together food'), is a traditional dish usually made with leftover pork, potato, and onion, and served with a fried egg, Worcestershire sauce, pickled red beet slices, and ketchup or bearnaise sauce. The coarsely-diced ingredients, rather than being mashed into a paste, are readily discernible in their cooked form. A beef variant is known as "royal hash", and a Southern Jutland regional dish including cream and served over pommes frites as "Kong Fiddes livret" ("King Frederik's favorite dish").

In Sweden, there is a version of hash called pyttipanna ('small-pieces-in-pan') and in Finland, pyttipannu and Norway, pyttipanne. It is similar to the Danish version. The Swedish variety pytt Bellman calls specifically for beef instead of other meats and adding cream to the hash. It is named after Sweden's 18th-century national poet Carl Michael Bellman.

In Austria, particularly Tyrol, a similar dish called Gröstl, usually consists of chopped leftover meats (often being pork sausage) and potato and onions, fried with herbs (typically marjoram and parsley) and topped with a fried egg.

In Slovenia, it is called haše and often used as a spaghetti sauce. It is made out of minced pork and veal meat, potato sauce, onion, garlic, flour and spices.

In Spanish, Portuguese and Latin American cuisines, there is a similar dish called picadillo (Spanish) or carne moída (Portuguese). It is made with ground meat (usually beef), tomatoes (tomato sauce may be used as a substitute), vegetables and spices that vary by region (the Portuguese and Brazilian version is generally carne moída refogada, very heavy on garlic, in the form of an aioli sofrito called refogado, and often also heavy on onion and bell peppers). It is often served with rice (it can be fried in aioli sofrito if those who will eat have a strong fondness for garlic), as well as okra, in the form of quiabo refogado—okra fried in an aioli sofrito, just as the hash itself and the collard greens used in feijoada—in Brazil, there constituting a staple) or used as a filling in dishes such as tacos, tostadas, or as a regular breakfast hash with eggs and tortillas (not in Brazil and Portugal). In Brazil and Portugal, it is used as bolognese sauce for pasta, and also used as a filling for pancake rolls, pastel (Brazilian pastry empanada), empadão and others. The name comes from the West Iberian (Spanish, Leonese and Portuguese) infinitive verb picar, which means 'to mince' or 'to chop'.

In the Philippines, hash is similar to that of Spanish and American versions. Commonly called carne norte con patatas, it is known as breakfast fare, since it includes corned beef, onions, and potatoes. Another variant, called pork giniling (giniling meaning 'ground') or giniling na baboy is similar to picadillo, and includes carrots, potatoes, and hard-boiled egg in tomato sauce.

In Germany, Labskaus is made with beef or corned beef minced with onions and boiled potatoes and fried in lard. Beetroot and herring may be added, or served as a side dish.

== See also ==
- Bubble and squeak
- Hash browns
- Hayashi rice
- Lobby
- Stamppot
- List of meat and potato dishes
- Tater tots - grated potato formed into small cylinders and deep-fried
