= Brændende kærlighed =

Danish potato dish

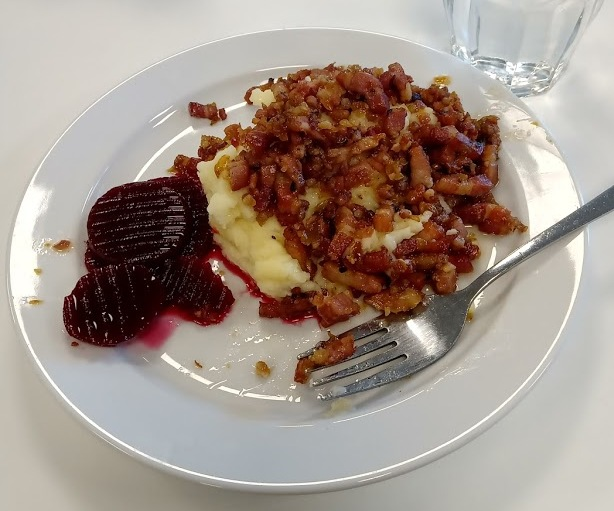
- Brændende kærlighed with mashed potatoes
- Place of origin: Denmark
- Main ingredients: Mashed potatoes, butter, whole milk or cream, bacon, onions

Brændende kærlighed (English: Burning love) is a traditional Danish dish consisting of mashed potatoes topped with bacon and onions, both fried. The mashed potatoes might also be topped with parsley, leek, or grated nutmeg.

It is traditional to serve this dish with "syltede rødbeder" (sweet pickled beets) as a sidedish.

== See also ==
- Danish cuisine
- List of meat and potato dishes
