= Leek soup =

Vegetable-based soup dish

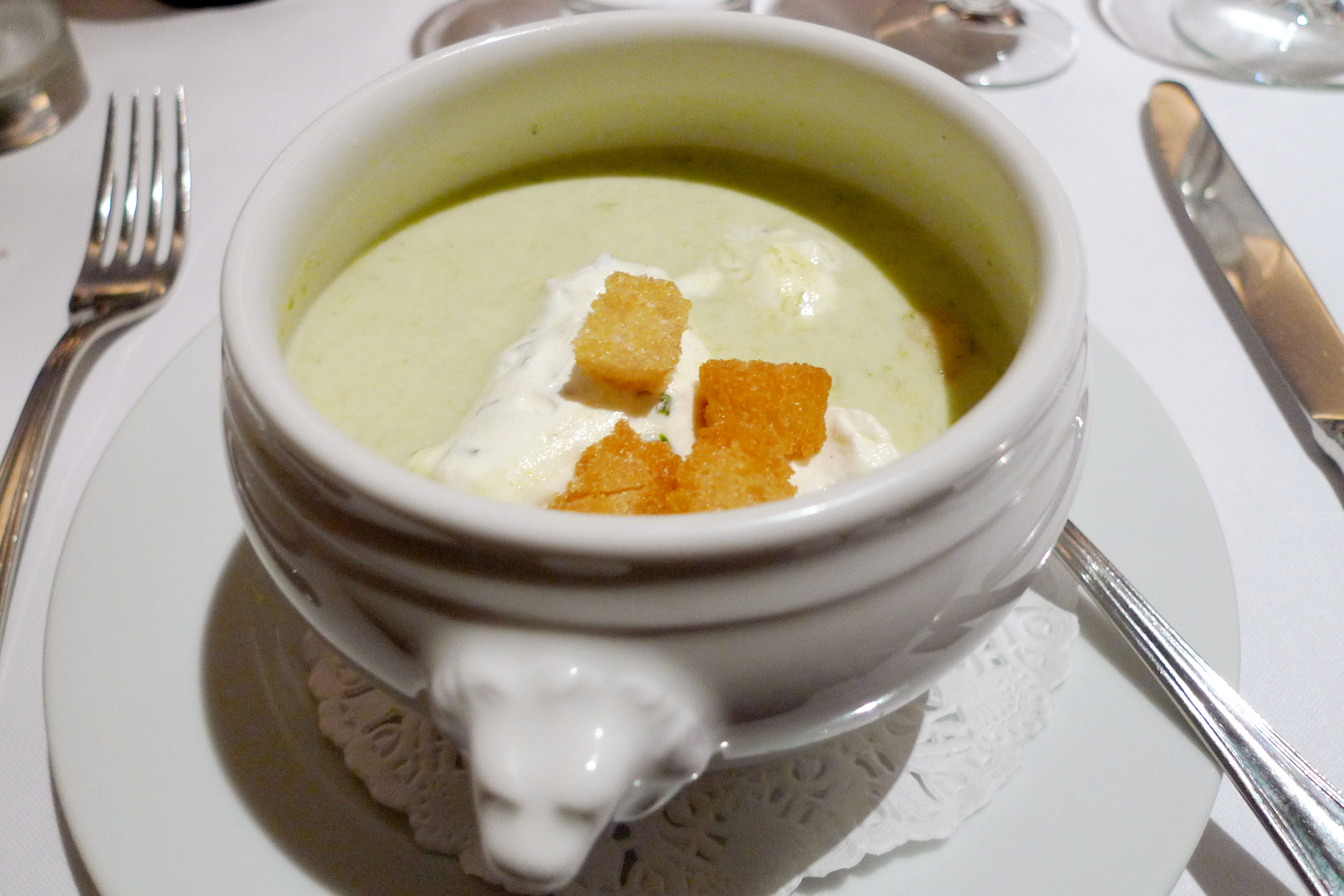
- Leek and potato soup
- Type: Soup
- Place of origin: Numerous cuisines
- Serving temperature: Usually hot
- Main ingredients: Leeks, potatoes, stock or water.

Leek soup is found in many cuisines. It is made from leeks and other vegetables simmered in water, stock, or broth. It often includes potatoes, in which case it may be called leek and potato soup. It may be thickened or enriched with milk, cream, butter, roux, egg-lemon, egg yolks, oatmeal, cheese, and so on.

It is usually served hot; chilled, it is the basis of vichyssoise.

== Background ==
Leek soup is documented across Europe and beyond. A 1771 reference book lists the Italian porrata, "a leek-soup or pottage". A Scottish cook, Susanna MacIver, included leek soup in her 1782 Cookery and Pastry; a Welsh version, cawl cennin – "leek pottage or porridge" – is recorded in 1794; a German-English dictionary from 1796 refers to Lauchsuppe, "leek pottage". Maria Rundell's Domestic Cookery (1808) gives a recipe for "Scotch Leek Soup", thickened with oatmeal.

French leek and potato soup is called potage Parmentier (in honour of Antoine-Augustin Parmentier, who popularised potatoes in France) and soupe à la bonne femme. Elizabeth David (1984) talks of "every French housewife's potato and leek soup". Porrusalda is a Basque leek soup, typically using the same ingredients as the versions from elsewhere. In Spain it is sopa de puerros y patatas.

In Greek and Turkish cuisine, it is often thickened with an egg-lemon mixture (avgolomono or terbiye).

== Contents ==
Leeks are common to all recipes. Some recipes use only the white part; others, both the white and the green. Potatoes are nearly ubiquitous. Other ingredients vary.

Writer	Cooking liquid	Other ingredients	Enrichment	Garnish	Ref
James Beard	chicken stock	potato	butter	nutmeg, cayenne	
Simone Beck et al	water	potato, onion	cream	parsley or chives	
Mary Berry	chicken or vegetable stock	potato, onion	cream	chives or parsley	
Robert Carrier	chicken stock	potato	cream	chives	
Julia Child	water	potato	cream	chives	
Craig Claiborne	chicken stock	potato, onion	cream	chives	
Auguste Escoffier	white stock	potato	milk and butter	croutons	
Jane Grigson	water	potato, onion, garlic			
Jeff Koehler	chicken stock or water	potato, carrot	olive oil		
Prosper Montagné	stock	potato	butter	chervil	
Simone Ortega	water	potato	stock		
Jacques Pépin	chicken stock and water	potato	butter	parsey or chervil, gruyère	
Maria Rundell	water	oatmeal			
Delia Smith	milk and chicken stock or water	potato, onion	cream	chives	

== Sources ==
- Bailey, Nathan (1796). Dictionary English-German and German-English. Leipzig: Friedrich Frommann. OCLC 5894344299.
- Baretti, Joseph (1771). A Dictionary of the English and Italian Languages. London: W. Strahan and others. OCLC 612508227.
- Beard, James (1995). James Beard Cookbook. New York: Angle. ISBN 1-56649-325-0., Publication date Publisher:
- Beck, Simone; Louisette Bertholle; Julia Child (2012) [1961]. Mastering the Art of French Cooking, Volume One. London: Particular. ISBN 978-0-241-95339-6.
- Carrier, Robert (1963). Great Dishes of the World. New York: Random House. OCLC 847789515.
- Claiborne, Craig (1973). A Kitchen Primer. London: Penguin. ISBN 978-0-14-046172-5.
- David, Elizabeth (1986) [1984]. An Omelette and a Glass of Wine. London: Penguin. ISBN 978-0-14-046721-5.
- Escoffier, Auguste (1907). A Guide to Modern Cookery. London: Heinemann. OCLC 894114602.
- Grigson, Jane (1998). Jane Grigson's Vegetable Book. London: Penguin. ISBN 978-0-14-027323-6.
- Koehler, Jeff (2013). Spain. San Francisco: Chronicle Books. ISBN 9780811875011.
- MacIver, Susanna (1782). Cookery and Pastry. Edinburgh: MacIver. OCLC 562039304.
- Montagné, Prosper (1976). Larousse Gastronomique. London: Hamlyn. OCLC 1285641881.
- Ortega, Simone (1972). 1080 Recetas Cocina (in Spanish). Madrid: Ediciones del Prado. ISBN 9788420609461.
- Pépin, Jacques (2015). Jacques Pépin Heart & Soul in the Kitchen. New York: Harper Collins. ISBN 978-0-544-30198-6.
- Rundell, Maria (1808). A New System of Domestic Cookery. London: John Murray. OCLC 1409083075.
- Smith, Delia (1978). Delia Smith's Complete Cookery Course. London: BBC. ISBN 0-56-336286-3.
- Walters, John (1794). An English-Welsh Dictionary. London: Walters. OCLC 9806966237.

== See also ==
- Cawl
- List of soups
- List of vegetable soups
