= Lobi =

Lobi may refer to:

- Lobi, Estonia, a village in Estonia
- Lobi people, a West African ethnic group
- Lobi language, a language spoken in West Africa

== See also ==
- Lobby (disambiguation)
