= Lobby =

Lobby may refer to:

- Lobby (room), an entranceway or foyer in a building
- Lobbying, the action or the group used to influence a viewpoint to politicians
- Lobby (food), a thick stew made in Leigh, Greater Manchester and North Staffordshire, like Lancashire Hotpot
- Lobby (band), a Slovak Eurodance band
- Lobby (film), a 2025 South Korean black comedy film
- "Lobby" (song), a 2014 song by Cibo Matto
- "Lobby" (Vanessa Mai song), a 2025 song
- The Lobby, UK parliamentary journalists receiving privileged political access in exchange for sourcing anonymity
- The Lobby (improv), an improvisational comedy group based in Southern California
- The Lobby (TV series), a documentary series by Al Jazeera about the Israel lobby in the US and UK
- The Lobby, a Somali film by Fathia Absie

== People with the name ==
- "Lobby", nickname of Seymour de Lotbiniere (1905–1984), English broadcasting executive and pioneer of outside broadcasts
- Lobby Loyde (1941–2007), Australian rock music guitarist, songwriter and producer

=== Fictional characters ===
- Lobby Lud, a fictional character invented in August 1927 by the British newspaper Westminster Gazette

== See also ==
- Lobi (disambiguation)
