= Rössypottu =

Northern Finnish stew of blodpalt, potatoes, and pork

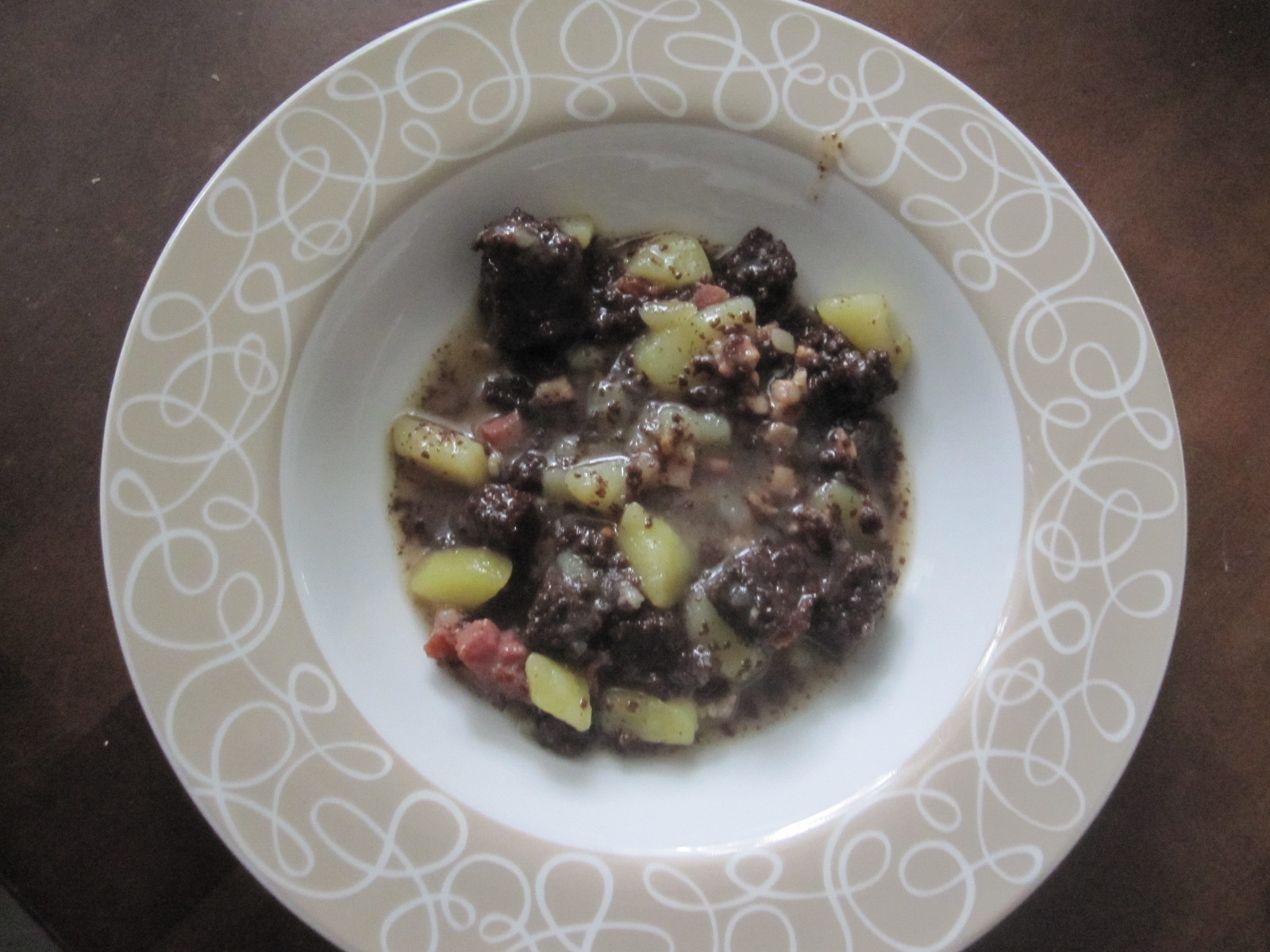
- Type: Stew
- Place of origin: Finland
- Region or state: Oulu
- Main ingredients: Rössy (blood, beer, rye flour, spices), Potatoes, pork

Rössypottu (Finnish pronunciation: [ˈrøsːyˌpotːu]) is a traditional Finnish dish which originates from the Oulu region yet is very much unknown in the southern parts of the country. Essentially a very simple dish, it is a stew made using potatoes (pottu, peruna), some pork and the main ingredient, so-called "rössy" i.e. blodpalt made of blood, beer, rye flour and some spices. Locally this dish is often referred to as "the pride of Oulu".

== See also ==
- List of stews
- List of meat and potato dishes
