= Xogoi Momo =

Momo with minced meat filling

- Type: Momo
- Place of origin: Tibet
- Main ingredients: Potatoes, minced meat, bread crumbs

In Tibetan cuisine, a xogoi momo (Tibetan script: ཞོག་ཁོག་མོག་མོག) is a type of momo made with mashed potato and dough that is shaped into balls. It is filled with a minced meat filling and served with bread crumbs.

== See also ==
- List of Tibetan dishes
- List of meat and potato dishes
