= Pyttipanna =

Scandinavian meat and potatoes dish

Pytt i panna
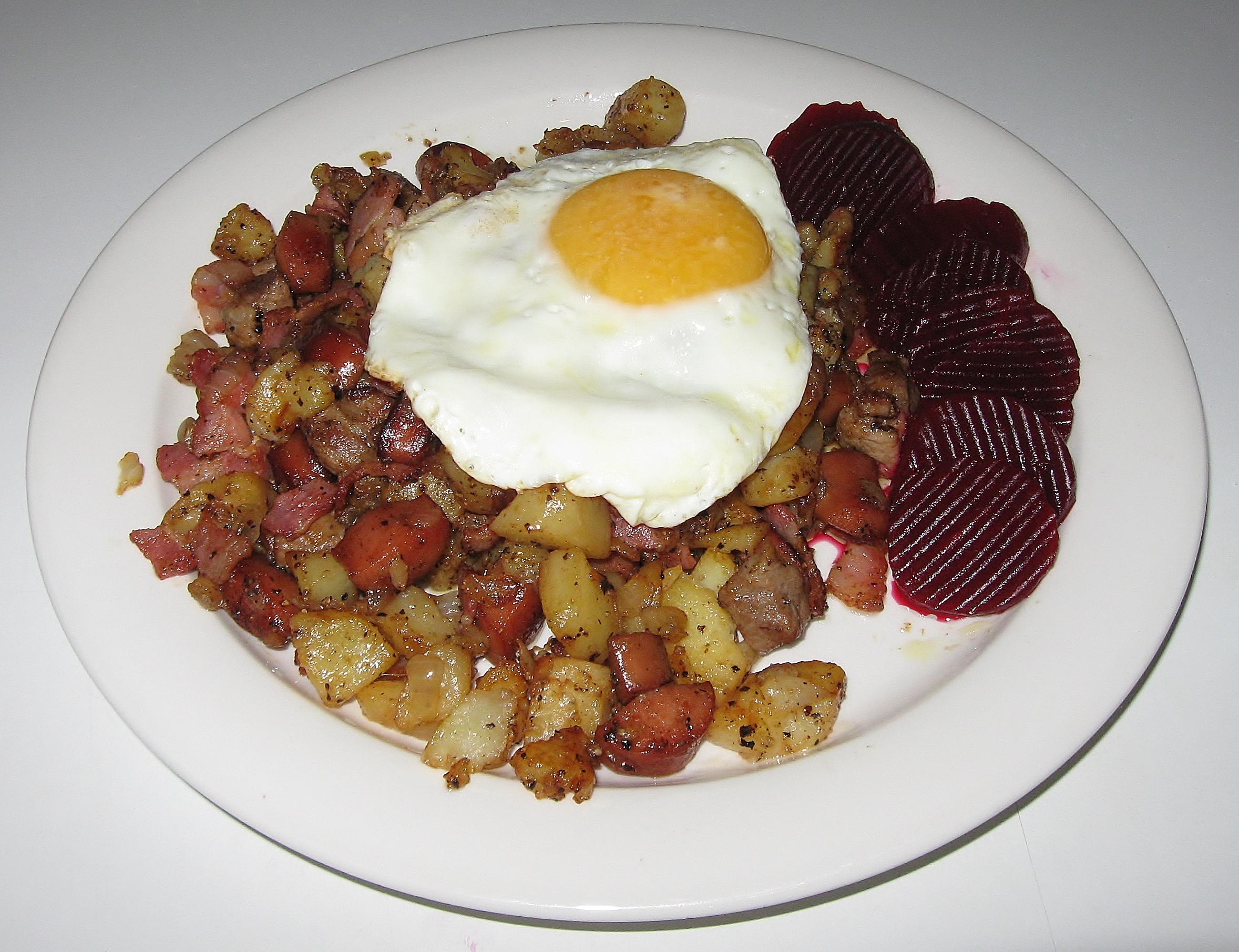
- Pytt i panna, as commonly served with a fried egg and pickled beetroot
- Alternative names: Biksemad, pytt i panne, pyttipanne, pyttipannu
- Place of origin: Sweden
- Main ingredients: Potatoes, onions, chopped or minced meat
- Ingredients generally used: Fried egg, pickled beetroot

Pytt i panna (Swedish), pytt i panne (Norwegian), pyttipannu (Finnish), bixímatur (Icelandic) or biksemad (Danish), is a culinary dish consisting of chopped meat, potatoes and onions fried in a pan, similar to a hash, and popular in the Nordic countries. The term "Pytt i panna" is Swedish for "small pieces in a pan".

Traditionally consisting of potatoes, onions, and any kind of chopped or minced meat such as sausage, ham, or meatballs, diced and then pan-fried, it is often served with a fried egg, pickled beetroot slices, sour pickled gherkin slices, capers and sometimes ketchup or brown sauce. An alternative version of the dish includes cream stirred in after frying, creating something like a gravy, turning it into "cream-stewed pytt i panna" (Swedish: gräddstuvad pytt i panna).

The dish was originally made from leftovers of past meals but now it is also common to prepare pytt i panna from prime ingredients. Frozen pytt i panna of many varieties can be bought in almost every Swedish, Danish, Norwegian, Icelandic and Finnish supermarket. Many variants of the dish exist, including vegetarian and vegan dishes.

Pytt i panna is often abbreviated to pytt, especially when referring to variants such as oxpytt (pytt i panna made with beef) or krögarpytt ("innkeeper's pytt", made with more finely diced potatoes and beef).

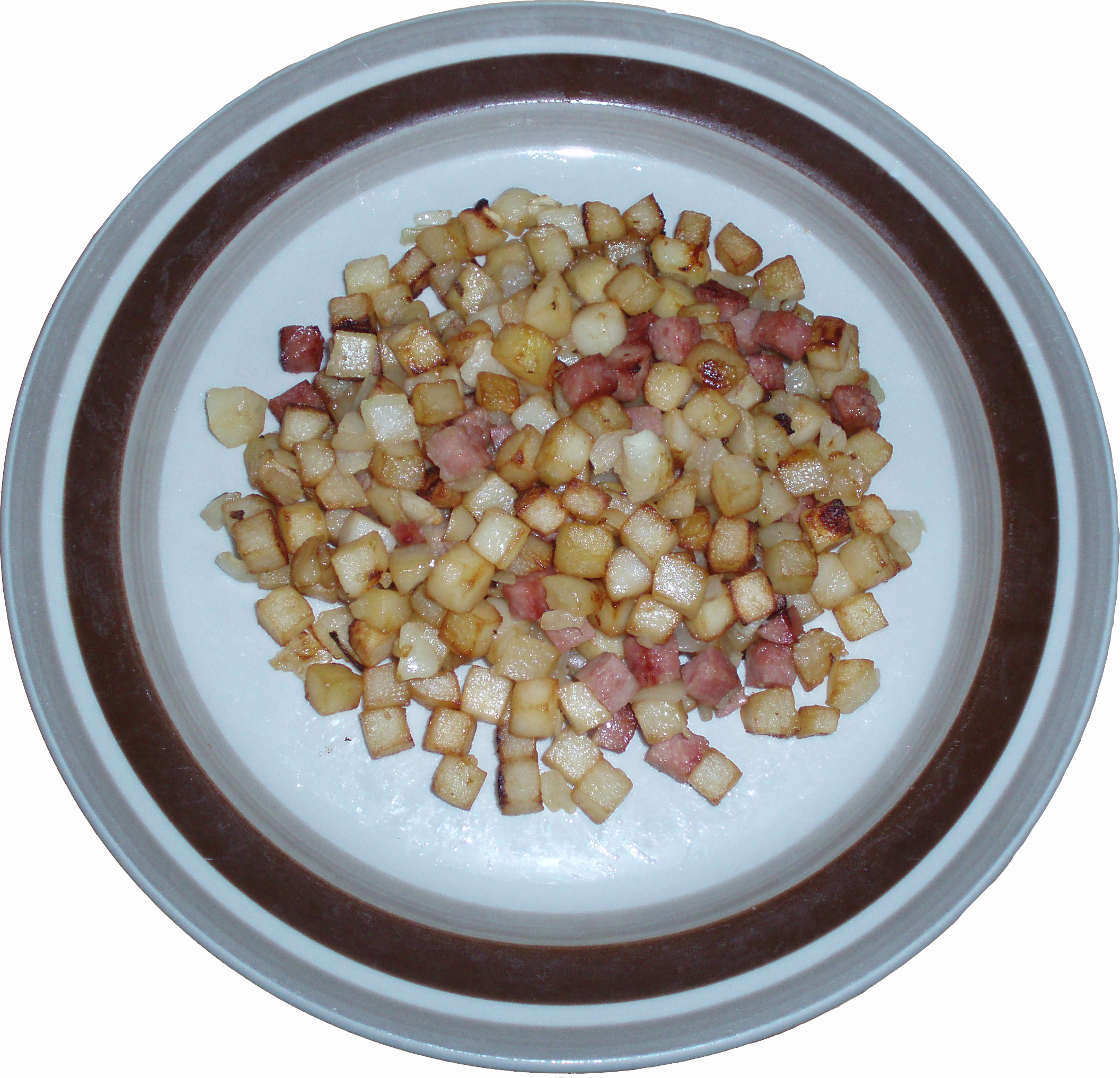
Plain pytt i panna without any garnish

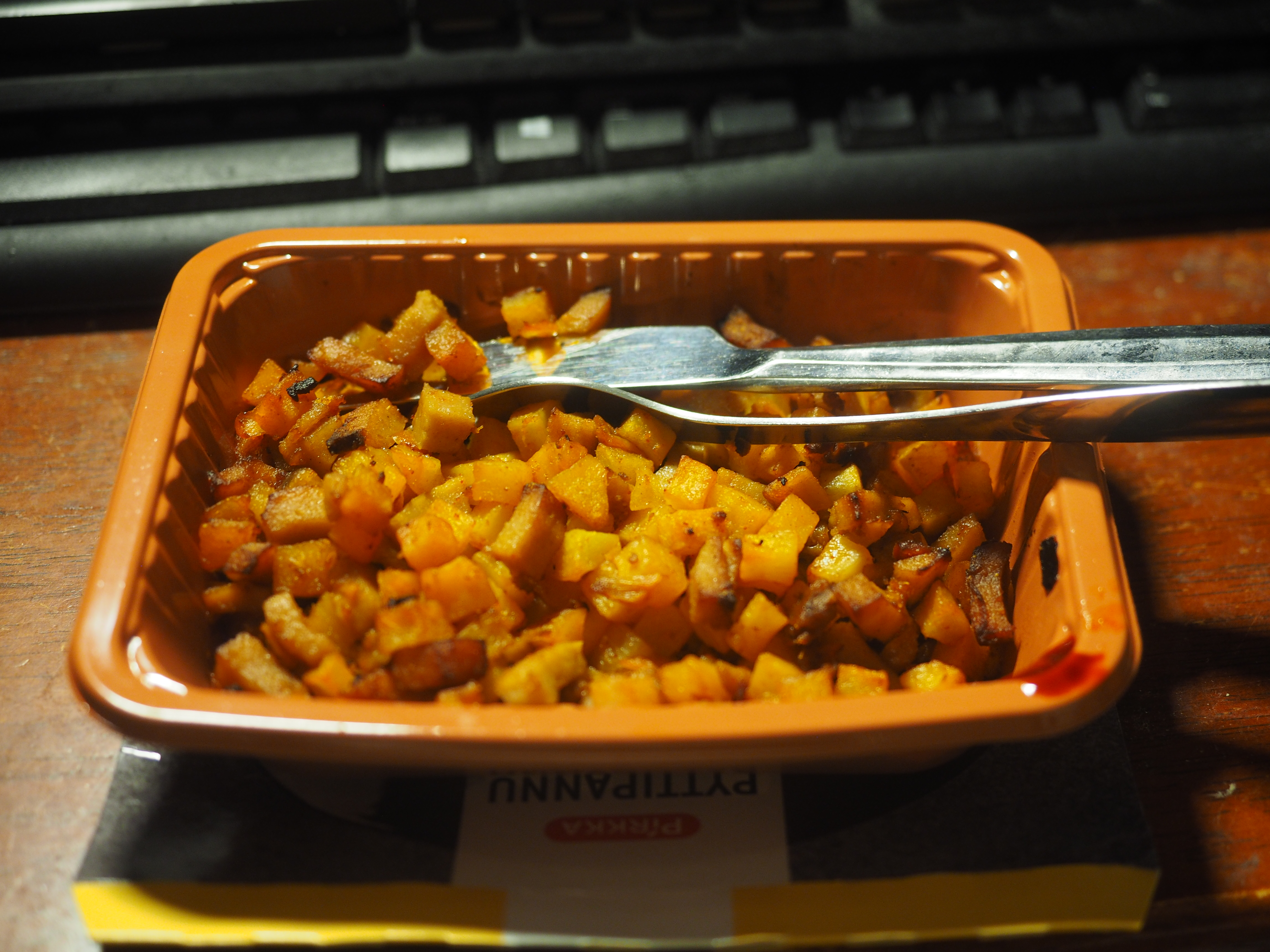
Finnish Pirkka pyttipannu (convenience meal)

== Similar dishes ==
- Potatoes O'Brien (see American cuisine)
- List of meat and potato dishes
