= Lobscouse =

Mariner’s stew of salt meat and ship’s biscuit

- Type: Stew
- Region or state: Northern Europe
- Main ingredients: Meat, ship's biscuit

External image
- Lobscouse at savoring the past.net

Lobscouse was a mariner’s dish in the Age of Sail and was a stew of salted meat and powdered ship's biscuit. It was common to multiple Northern European maritime countries.

It is referred to nautical literature, such as "The Wooden World", as well as fiction such as Patrick O'Brian's Aubrey and Maturin novels.

== Etymology ==
Edward Ward's reference to "lobscouse", 24 November 1706

Lobscouse is described as a sailors dish of meat stewed with vegetables and ships biscuit or the like. The oldest citation from the Oxford English Dictionary is from 1706 by the satirist Edward Ward. Tobias Smollett refers to lob's course in 1750. The roots of the word are unknown.

Lobscouse has given its name, though not its form, to a variety of dishes around Northern Europe and beyond, such as Norwegian Lapskaus (a meat and potato stew), German Labskaus (a kind of corned beef hash), Danish Skipperlabskovs (da), Swedish Lapskojs (sv) and Finnish Lapskoussi (fi), (all a kind of bubble and squeak), and Newfoundland Lobscouse (a cabbage soup).

Lobscouse is also linked (historically and etymologically) in the UK to "Scouse" (Merseyside), "Lobby" (Staffordshire), and "Lobsgows" (North Wales), all different kinds of stews using local meat, potato and vegetables.

== Ingredients and variations ==
On a long sea voyage only foodstuffs that had been preserved were available, such as salted meat (beef or pork) and ship’s biscuit (bread that had been baked twice to drive out the moisture, and known as "hard tack"). Lobscouse was a stew of salt meat, broken ship’s biscuit, with onions, potatoes and other vegetables as available. The biscuit was prepared by being put in a bag and pounded with a marlinspike or other heavy tool to make a coarse flour: The ingredients were then boiled together to form a coarse savoury porridge.
