= Scotch broth =

Scottish soup

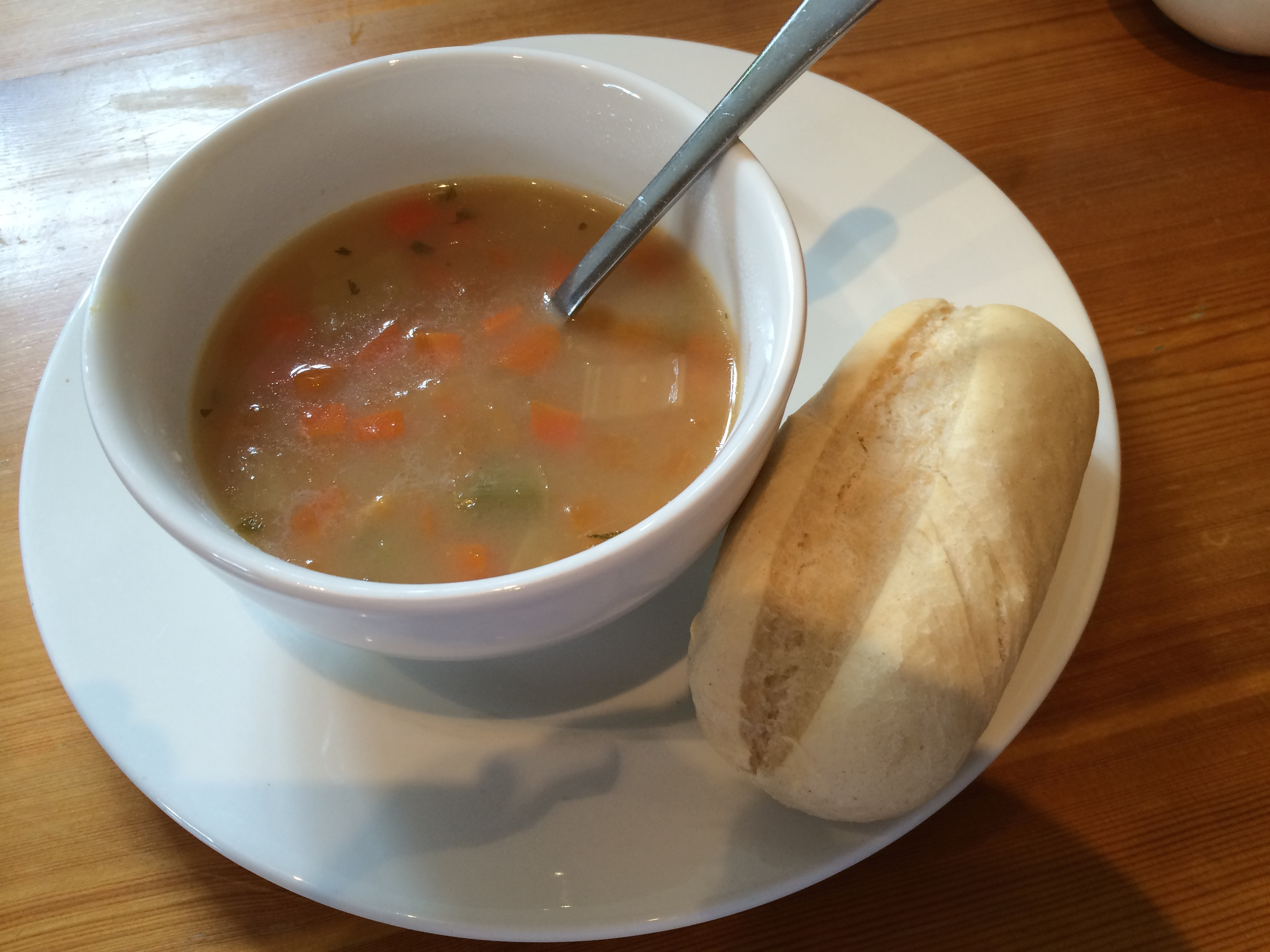
- Scotch broth with some bread on the side
- Alternative names: Barley broth
- Type: Soup
- Course: Starter
- Place of origin: Scotland
- Main ingredients: Barley, lamb, mutton or beef, root vegetables (carrots, swedes), dried pulses

Scotch broth is a soup originating in Scotland. The principal ingredients (fresh or preserved as available) are usually barley, stewing or braising cuts of lamb, mutton or beef, root vegetables (such as carrots, swedes, or sometimes turnips), and dried pulses (most often split peas and red lentils). Cabbage and leeks are often added shortly before serving to preserve their texture, colour and flavours. The proportions and ingredients vary according to the recipe or availability. Scotch broth has been sold ready-prepared in tins for many years.

== History ==
In the early 19th-century cookery book A New System of Domestic Cookery by Maria Rundell, "Scotch Mutton Broth" is made with mutton neck, skimmed and simmered around an hour before good-quality cuts of bone-in mutton are trimmed of their fat and added to the soup. After several hours, soup vegetables are added—turnips, carrots and onion—and simmered until just tender; finally, pre-soaked Scotch barley is added. The soup is served with a garnish of fresh parsley.

According to Christian Isobel Johnstone, the mutton could be served on the side as a bouilli with caper sauce, parsley and butter, pickled cucumbers, or nasturtiums (edible flowers) with mustard and vinegar.

== Ingredients ==
The main ingredients are barley, stewing lamb or mutton, and root vegetables like swedes, potatoes, turnips and carrots. Dried beans are another common addition, as are cabbage and leeks, which can be added in later stages of cooking.

== See also ==
- Cawl
- Irish stew
- Instant-boiled mutton
- Lancashire hotpot
- List of lamb dishes
- List of soups
- Scouse (food)
