= Lancashire hotpot =

Stew from Lancashire, England

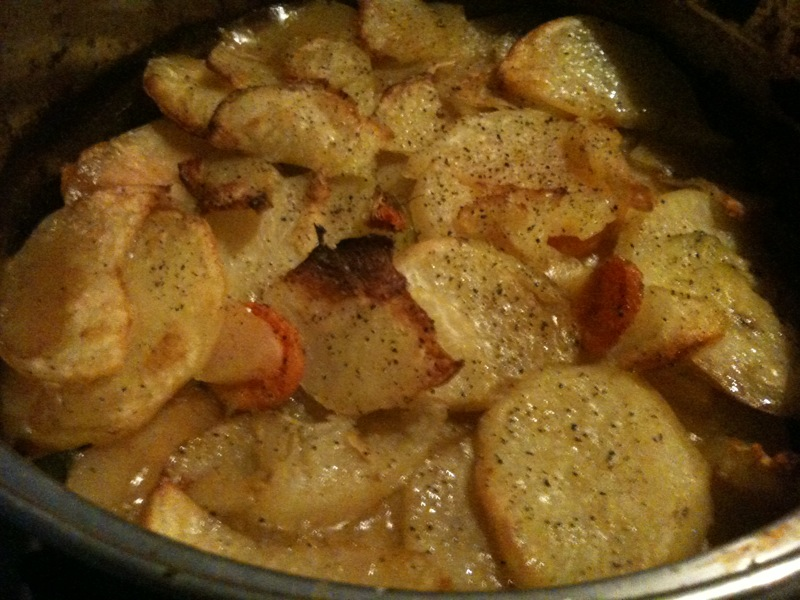
- Lancashire hotpot
- Course: Main course
- Place of origin: England
- Region or state: Lancashire
- Serving temperature: Hot
- Main ingredients: Lamb or mutton, onions, potatoes

Lancashire hotpot is a stew originating in Lancashire in North West England. It consists of lamb or mutton and onion, topped with sliced potatoes and slowly baked in a pot at a low heat.

== History and etymology ==
In the 17th century, the word "hotpot" referred to a hot drink—a mixture of ale and spirits, or sweetened spiced ale. An early use of the term to mean a meat stew was in The Liverpool Telegraph in 1836: "hashes, and fricassees, and second-hand Irish hot-pots" and the Oxford English Dictionary (OED) cites the dish as being served in Liverpool in 1842. The Oxford Companion to Food (OCF) cites Elizabeth Gaskell's 1854 novel North and South, depicting hot-pot as the most prized dish among cotton workers in a northern town.

The OED gives the etymology as "hot adj. + pot n.", and cites the analogous French term pot-au-feu. The OCF refers to earlier forms of the term: "hotchpotch" (a mixed dish, typically a meat and vegetable stew) and "hotchpot", from the medieval French hochepot. (Note: According to the Dictionnaire de l'Académie française, the term "hochepot" dates from the 13th century and means "shake pot", because the cook must shake the pot so that the content does not stick. The stew is of minced meat, cooked without water in a pot with vegetables and seasonings.) A Book of Cookrye (1591) gives a recipe for hodgepodge, using "neck of mutton or a fat rump of beef", cooked and served in a broth thickened with bread. The term "hotchpotch" for a stew continued into the 19th century: Mrs Beeton (1861) gives a recipe under that name for a beef and onion stew in beer.

Hotpot became associated with Lancashire. In the OCF the food historian Roy Shipperbottom writes:

It may be that local cheap coal (used in locally made kitchen ranges) and the fact that the potato came early into use in Lancashire combined to make this dish popular. Also, it was a great advantage that hotpot could be left to cook while the family were at work.

== Preparation ==
The recipe usually calls for a mix of mutton (nowadays more frequently lamb) and onions covered with sliced potato, and slowly baked in a pot containing stock or sometimes water. Some early recipes add lamb kidneys or oysters to the dish.

The traditional Lancashire hotpot dish is tall, round, and straight-sided, with a lid. Regardless of the baking dish, the lid should fit tightly. Lancashire hotpot is traditionally served with pickled red cabbage.

== Sources ==
- Beeton, Isabella (1861). The Book of Household Management. London: S.O. Beeton. OCLC 1045333327.
- Gaskell, Elizabeth (1951). North and South. London: John Lehman. OCLC 1897946.
- Shipperbottom, Roy (2014). "hotpot". In Alan Davidson; Tom Jaine (eds.). Oxford Companion to Food (third ed.). Oxford: Oxford University Press. ISBN 978-0-19-104072-6.

== See also ==
- Sunday roast
- Hodge-Podge
- Pot roast
- Scotch broth
- List of meat and potato dishes
