= Labskaus =

German corned beef dish

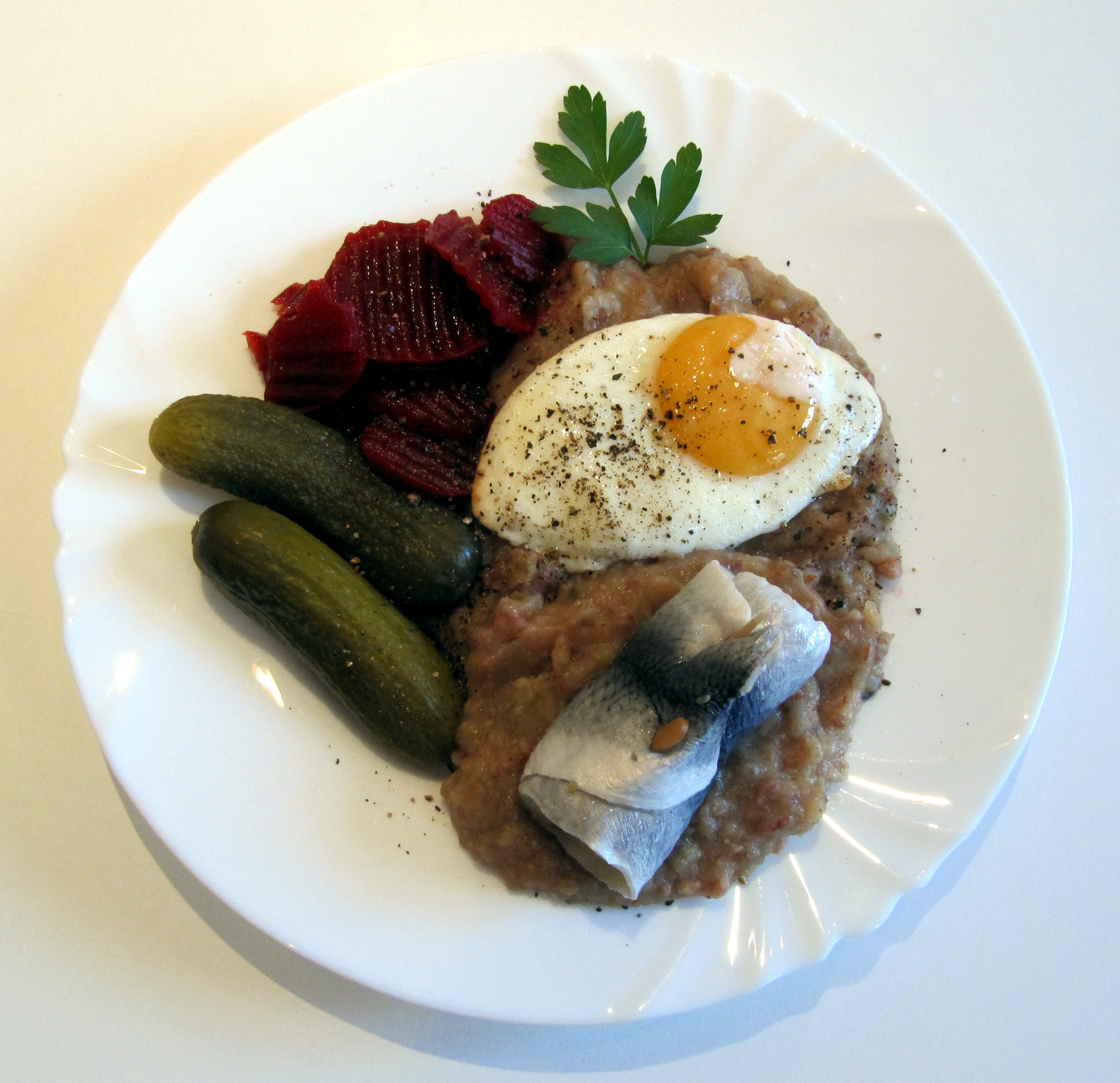
- Hamburg-style Labskaus with fried egg, gherkin, sliced beetroot, and rollmops
- Region or state: northern Germany
- Main ingredients: salted meat or corned beef, potatoes, and onion

Labskaus (German: [ˈlapskaʊ̯s]) is a culinary speciality from northern Germany and in particular from the cities of Bremen, Hamburg and Lübeck. The main ingredients are salted meat or corned beef, potatoes, and onion. Some recipes put beetroot, pickled gherkin, or even herring into it, while others have these ingredients as side dishes.

== Etymology ==
The origin of this word is uncertain. One possible source for the name could be Latvian labs kauss, meaning 'good bowl' or hotpot, or Lithuanian labas káušas, meaning the same. The dish became common among sailors during the Age of Sail. Potatoes and salted meats were standard fare and labskaus would stretch the meat supply. Labskaus is now commonly served in restaurants only on Germany's northern coast, as well as in traditional Danish restaurants. Compare with scouse.

== Preparation ==
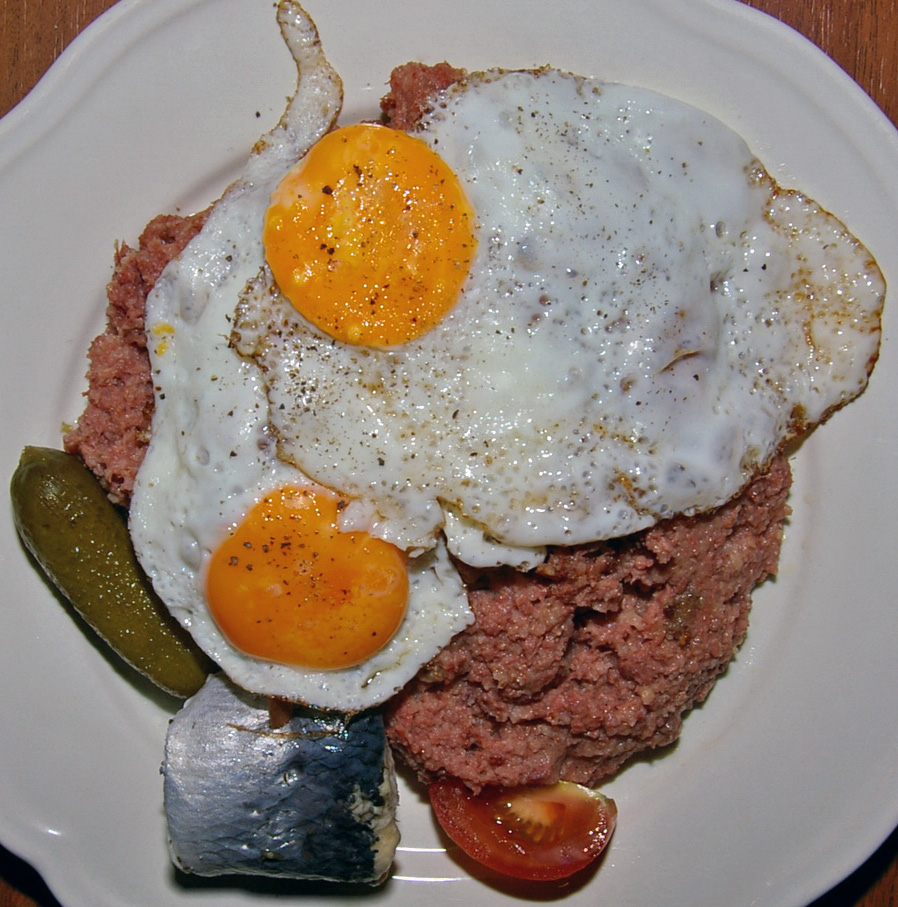
Labskaus with fried egg

The meal is traditionally prepared by boiling the beef in broth and then mincing it with the beetroot, onions, boiled potatoes and herring (some recipes use ham). Finally the base is fried in lard, condiments such as nutmeg, pepper, coriander, or allspice are added. Countless variations of the dish exist. For example, in Bremen, 95 kilometres (59 mi) away from Hamburg, Labskaus usually is a preparation of fried corned beef, onions and mashed potatoes with the beetroot and rollmops being served as a side dish.

Variations of the dish are also to be found in Scandinavia, generally without the use of herring. In Denmark, the dish is similar to the Bremen version, but without the herring and some times with added gravy. In Sweden, Lapskojs is a stew made with beef and mashed potatoes. In Norway, the word lapskaus (nor) more often refers to a variation of beef stew often made with gravy, or in some cases other types of stew.

== Similarly named dishes ==
- Lobscouse, and its variations Lobby and Scouse
- Lapskoussi

== See also ==
- German cuisine
- List of beef dishes
- List of meat and potato dishes
