= Lobby (food) =

Stew made from beef, and potato

Lobby or lobbies is a traditional stew or casserole, containing beef, vegetables, and pearl barley.

== Background ==
Lobby is a traditional north Staffordshire stew eaten by potters. It consists of minced or diced beef or lamb, diced potatoes, onions, carrots, leeks, and root vegetables bulked up with pearl barley and seasoned. Maurice Hassell describes Lobby as "a nutritious economic meal made with the season’s vegetables". It remains on the menus of local pubs and on locals' dinner tables today.

In Leigh, Greater Manchester, the dish earned the nickname "lobby gobblers" for the inhabitants of the town, in contrast to the "pie eaters" of neighbouring Wigan. However, one writer from Wigan states that, as well as mutton or tinned stewing steak, lobby can be made using corned beef.

A similar dish to lobby can be found in Liverpool, where it is called scouse. It is thought both names derive from "lobscouse", a cheap stew dating from the early 18th century.

== See also ==
- List of meat and potato dishes
