= Serbia =

Country in Southeastern and Central Europe

Republic of Serbia Република Србија Republika Srbija
- Flag Coat of arms
- Anthem: Боже правде Bože pravde "God of Justice"
- Location of Serbia (green) and the disputed territory of Kosovo (light green) in Europe (dark grey)
- Capital and largest city: Belgrade; 44°48′N 20°28′E
- Official languages: Serbian (Note: Recognized as minority languages: Hungarian, Bosnian, Albanian, Croatian, Slovak, Romanian, Bulgarian, Rusyn, and Macedonian)
- Ethnic groups (2022): 80.6% Serbs; 2.8% Hungarians; 2.3% Bosniaks; 2% Roma; 5.4% others; 6.9% undeclared/ unknown (Note: Excluding Kosovo)
- Religion (2022): 86.6% Christianity; 81.1% Orthodoxy; 3.9% Catholicism; 1.7% other; 4.2% Islam; 1.1% no religion; 7.9% undeclared/ unknown (Note: Excluding Kosovo)
- Demonym: Serbian
- Government: Unitary parliamentary republic
  - President: Aleksandar Čupić (acting)
  - Prime Minister: Đuro Macut (caretaker)
  - President of the National Assembly: Aleksandar Čupić
- Legislature: National Assembly

Establishment history
  - Principality: 7th century
  - Kingdom: 1217
  - Empire: 1346
  - Principality of Serbia: 1815
  - Kingdom of Serbia: 1882
  - Kingdom of Yugoslavia: 1918
  - Socialist Yugoslavia (constituent republic): 1945
  - Serbia and Montenegro (constituent state): 1992
  - Republic of Serbia: 2006

Area
  - Total: 88,499 km^{2} (34,170 sq mi) (111th)
  - Excluding Kosovo: 77,589 km^{2} (29,957 sq mi) (115th)

Population
  - 2026 estimate: ▼6,532,019 (Note: Excluding Kosovo) (107th)
  - 2022 census: ▼6,647,003 (Note: Excluding Kosovo) (107th)
  - Density: 84/km^{2} (217.6/sq mi) (130th)
- GDP (PPP): 2026 estimate
  - Total: ▲$228.475 billion (Note: Excluding Kosovo) (79th)
  - Per capita: ▲$35,186 (66th)
- GDP (nominal): 2026 estimate
  - Total: ▲$111.204 billion (Note: Excluding Kosovo) (73rd)
  - Per capita: ▲$17,126 (67th)
- Gini (2025): ▲32.0 medium inequality
- HDI (2023): ▲0.833 very high (62nd)
- Currency: Serbian dinar (RSD)
- Time zone: UTC+1 (CET)
  - Summer (DST): UTC+2 (CEST)
- Date format: Day, month, year
- Calling code: +381
- ISO 3166 code: RS
- Internet TLD: .rs; .срб

Serbia, (Note: /ˈsɜːrbiə/ SUR-bee-ə; Serbian: Србија, romanized: Srbija, pronounced [sř̩bija]) officially the Republic of Serbia, (Note: Serbian: Република Србија, romanized: Republika Srbija, pronounced [repǔblika sř̩bija]) is a landlocked country in Southeastern and Central Europe. It is bordered by Hungary to the north, Romania to the northeast, Bulgaria to the southeast, North Macedonia to the south, Croatia to the northwest, Bosnia and Herzegovina to the west, Montenegro to the southwest, and it also claims a border with Albania through the disputed territory of Kosovo. Serbia has about 6.5 million inhabitants; (Note: Excluding Kosovo) its capital, Belgrade, is also its largest city.

Continuously inhabited since the Paleolithic age, the territory of modern-day Serbia, then part of the Roman Empire, experienced Slavic migrations in the 6th century. The first Serb proto-state was established in the 7th century and by the 9th century had developed into a more stable principality, recognized as a tributary state to the Byzantine Empire. The Serbian Kingdom was established in 1217, reaching its territorial apex in 1346 as the Serbian Empire. By the mid-16th century, the Ottoman Empire had annexed the entirety of modern-day Serbia; their rule was at times interrupted by the Habsburg Empire, which maintained a foothold in the northern part of the country from the early 18th century. At the beginning of the 19th century, the Serbian Revolution established the Principality of Serbia, which developed into a constitutional monarchy and gained international recognition of its independence in 1878 before being proclaimed a kingdom in 1882.

Emerging victorious from World War I, Serbia incorporated the former Habsburg crownland of Vojvodina into its territory in 1918, before uniting that same year with Croats and Slovenes to form the Kingdom of Yugoslavia, ending its existence as a separate political entity. Serbia was re-established after World War II as one of six federal units of socialist Yugoslavia. During the breakup of Yugoslavia, it formed a union with Montenegro, which was dissolved in 2006, subsequently restoring Serbia's independence. In 2008, Kosovo unilaterally declared independence, receiving mixed responses from the international community, while Serbia continues to regard it as part of its sovereign territory.

Serbia is a parliamentary republic, with its constitution ensuring the separation of powers between the executive (with president and government headed by the prime minister), legislative (with unicameral parliament), and judiciary branches. The country is a member of the United Nations and numerous other international organizations and has been negotiating its accession to the European Union. It exerts regional influence as a small power in Europe, particularly in neighbouring Southeast Europe. An upper-middle-income economy, Serbia provides universal health care as well as free primary and secondary education and subsidized tertiary education to its citizens.

== Etymology ==
The name Serbia derives from the ethnonym Serb. The origin of the ethnonym Serb itself is unclear. There are two prevailing theories about the origin of the ethnonym *Sŕbъ (pl. *Sŕby): one derives it from Proto-Slavic, with an appellative meaning of "family kinship" and "alliance", while the other derives it from an Iranian-Sarmatian language, with various meanings.

The earliest mentions of the Serbs are in the 7th-century Chronicle of Fredegar, which describes Dervan as "the duke of the Serb people, who are of Slavic descent" (Latin: Dervanus dux gente Surbiorum, que ex genere Sclavinorum erant), and Einhard's Royal Frankish Annals, written in the 8th and 9th centuries, which mention "the Serbs, a people that is said to hold a large part of Dalmatia" (ad Sorabos, quae natio magnam Dalmatiae partem obtinere dicitur). Authors in the early Middle Ages referred to the Serbs and the lands they inhabited in a variety of ways: gentis (S)urbiorum, Suurbi, Soraborum, Sorabi, Sorabos, Sorabici, Sorabiet, Sorbi, Servetiis, Surpe, Sarbin, Swrbjn, Servians, Sirbia, Sribia, Zirbia, Zribia, Suurbelant, Surbia, Serbulia, Sorbulia, among others.

In the medieval period, Serbia was known as the Serbian Kingdom from 1217 to 1346, followed by the Serbian Empire from 1346 to 1371, and finally the Serbian Despotate from 1402 to 1459. In the modern period, the official name of the country was the Principality of Serbia from 1815 to 1882, followed by the Kingdom of Serbia from 1882 to 1918. In the contemporary period, the official name was the People's Republic of Serbia from 1945 to 1963, the Socialist Republic of Serbia from 1963 to 1990, and, since 1990, the Republic of Serbia.

== History ==
=== Prehistory and antiquity ===
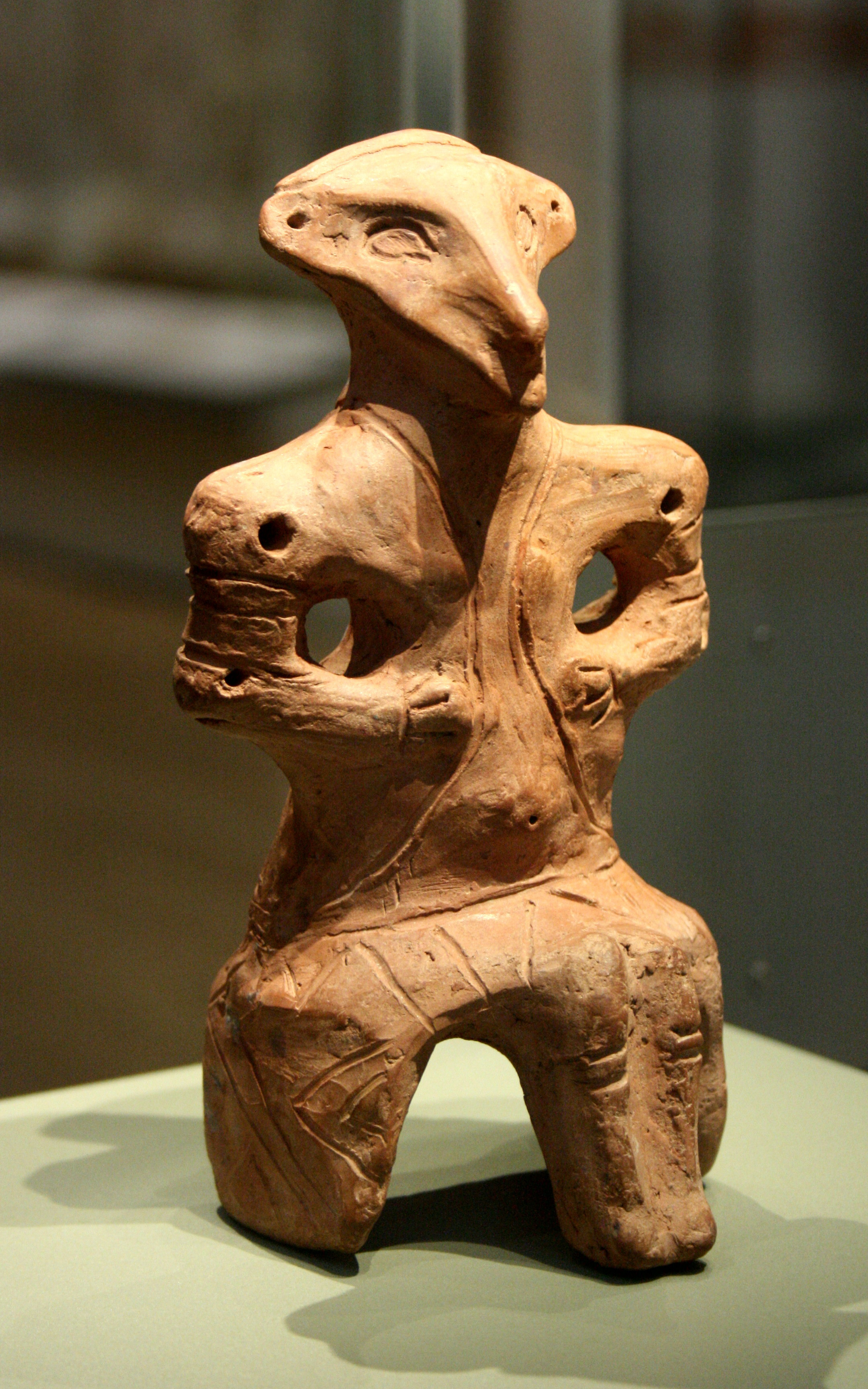
Vinča culture figurine, 4000–4500 BC

Archaeological evidence of Paleolithic settlements on the territory of present-day Serbia is scarce. A fragment of a hominid jaw found in Mala Balanica Cave is believed to be up to 525,000 years old.

Around 6500 BC, during the Neolithic, the Starčevo and Vinča cultures were present in the region of modern-day Belgrade. They were widespread across much of Southeast Europe as well as parts of Central Europe and Anatolia. Several important archaeological sites from this era, including Lepenski Vir and Vinča-Belo Brdo, exist along the banks of the Danube.

During the Iron Age, the Greeks encountered local tribes of Triballi, Dardani, and Autariatae as they expanded culturally and politically into the region from the 5th to the 2nd century BC. The Celtic tribe of Scordisci settled throughout the area in the 3rd century BC. They established a tribal state and built several fortified settlements, including Singidunum (present-day Belgrade) and Naissos (present-day Niš).

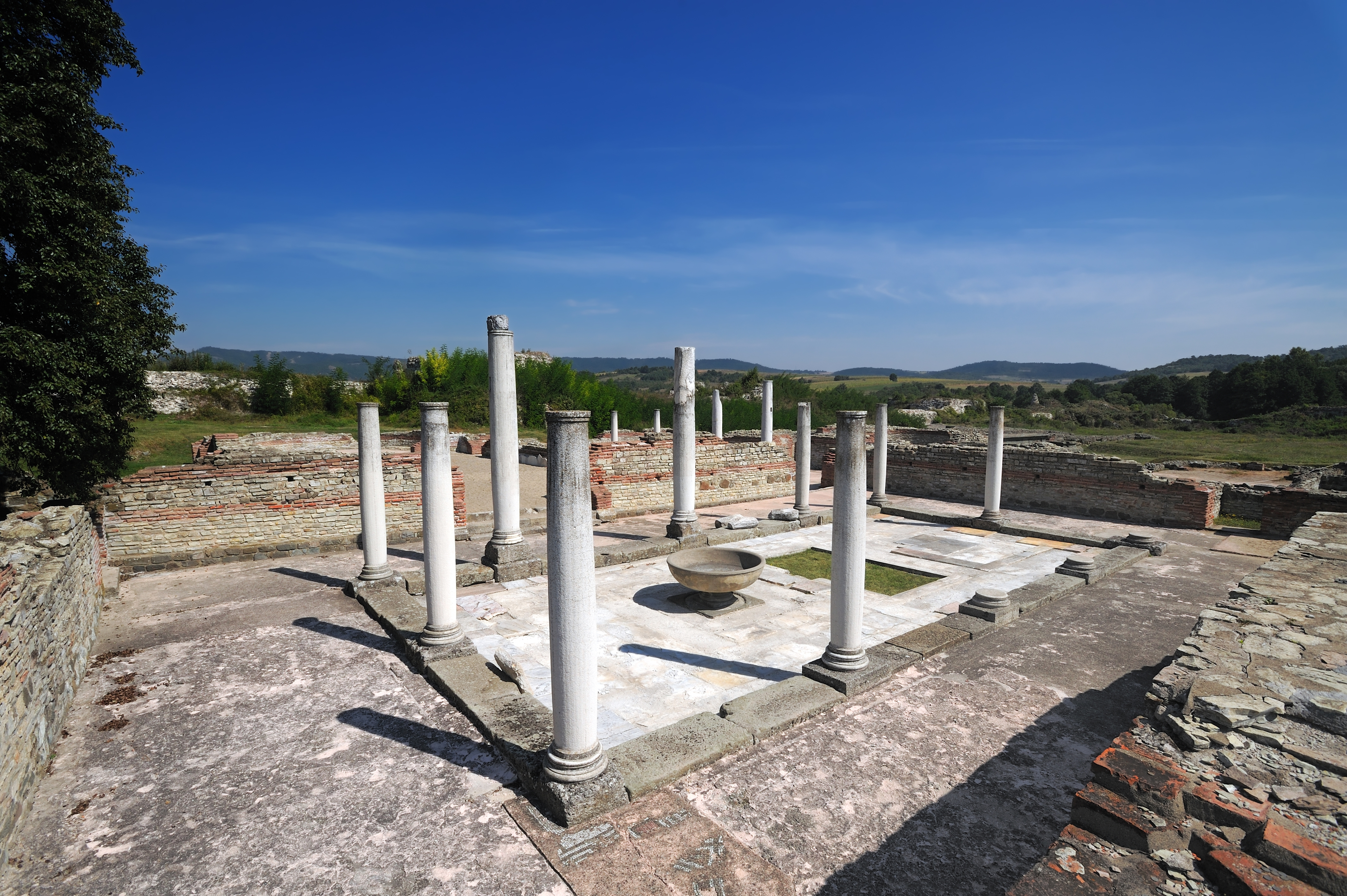
Ruins of the Felix Romuliana, imperial palace of the Emperor Galerius, 298 AD

The Romans conquered much of the territory in the 2nd century BC. In 167 BC, the Roman province of Illyricum was established, covering modern-day western Serbia. The territory of eastern and southern Serbia was conquered around 75 BC, forming the Roman province of Moesia Superior; the modern-day Syrmia region was conquered in 9 BC, and Bačka and Banat in 106 AD after the Dacian Wars. Some historians believe 18 Roman emperors were born in the territory of modern-day Serbia, the second-highest number of any modern country after Italy. The most famous of these was Constantine the Great, the first Christian Emperor, who issued an edict ordering religious tolerance throughout the Empire. When the Roman Empire was divided in 395, most of present-day Serbia became part of the Byzantine Empire.

=== Middle Ages ===
By the 6th century, early Slavs had migrated into Byzantine territory in large numbers, merging with the local romanized population, which was gradually assimilated. White Serbs, an early Slavic tribe, eventually settled in an area between the Sava river and the Dinaric Alps. The first Serbian proto-state was established in the 7th century and was based largely on tribal and kinship structures, but by the beginning of the 9th century it had developed into a more stable principality with more centralized institutions, while remaining a Byzantine vassal state throughout. It was completely conquered and annexed by the Byzantine Empire in the late 10th century and ceased to exist as an independent polity for almost a century.

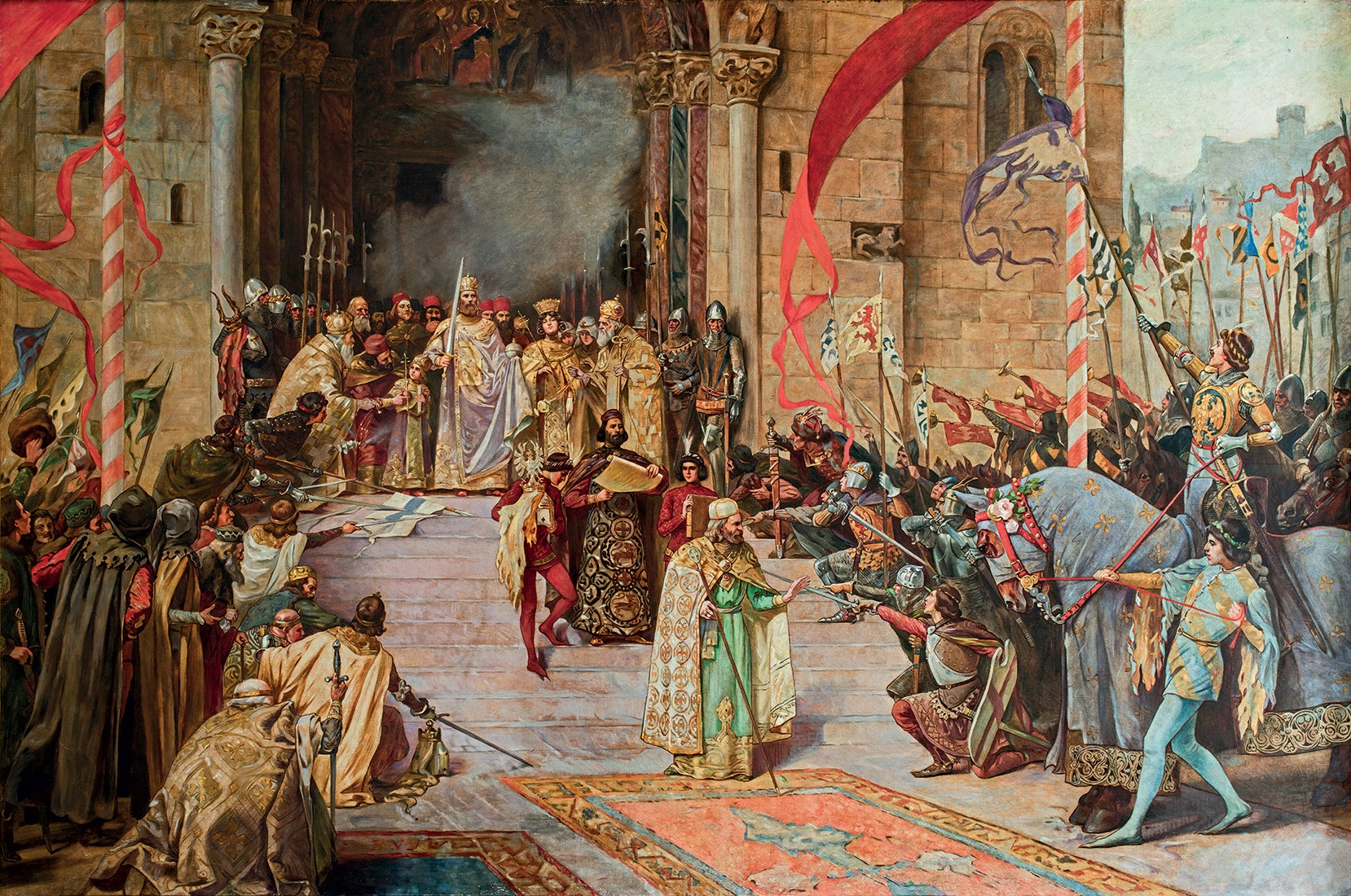
Coronation of Stefan Dušan as Emperor of the Serbs in 1346

At the end of the 11th century, Serbia re-emerged as the grand principality, which was consolidated under Stefan Nemanja, the founder of the Nemanjić dynasty. Under the Nemanjić dynasty, Serbia gradually expanded its territory, emerging from a regional principality into one of the major powers in Southeastern Europe. Its territorial growth culminated in the 13th and 14th centuries, when Serbia became a kingdom (in 1217) and later an empire (in 1346), extending its rule over large parts of the Balkans.

Following the fall of the Serbian Empire in 1371, the Serbian lands fragmented among several regional rulers as the Ottoman Empire expanded into the Balkans. The Battle of Kosovo in 1389, fought between Serbian forces and the Ottomans, was one of the most consequential events in Serbian history and became a central element of national mythology. The battle resulted in the establishment of Ottoman suzerainty over the Serbian lands, although Serbian statehood was subsequently revived in the form of the despotate. Caught between the Ottoman Empire and the Kingdom of Hungary, the Serbian Despotate alternated between Ottoman and Hungarian vassalage as political circumstances changed, until the fall of its capital, Smederevo, to the Ottomans in 1459 marked the end of the independent medieval Serbian state.

=== Ottoman and Habsburg rule ===
In all Serb lands conquered by the Ottomans, the native nobility was eliminated and the peasantry was enserfed to Ottoman nobles, including aghas and beys, while much of the clergy retreated to isolated monasteries. Under the Ottoman millet system, Christians were classified as rayah and subjected to heavy taxation, while a portion of the Serbian population underwent Islamization. The Patriarchate of Peć was abolished in 1463 and restored in 1557, allowing for the limited continuation of Serbian cultural traditions within the Ottoman Empire.

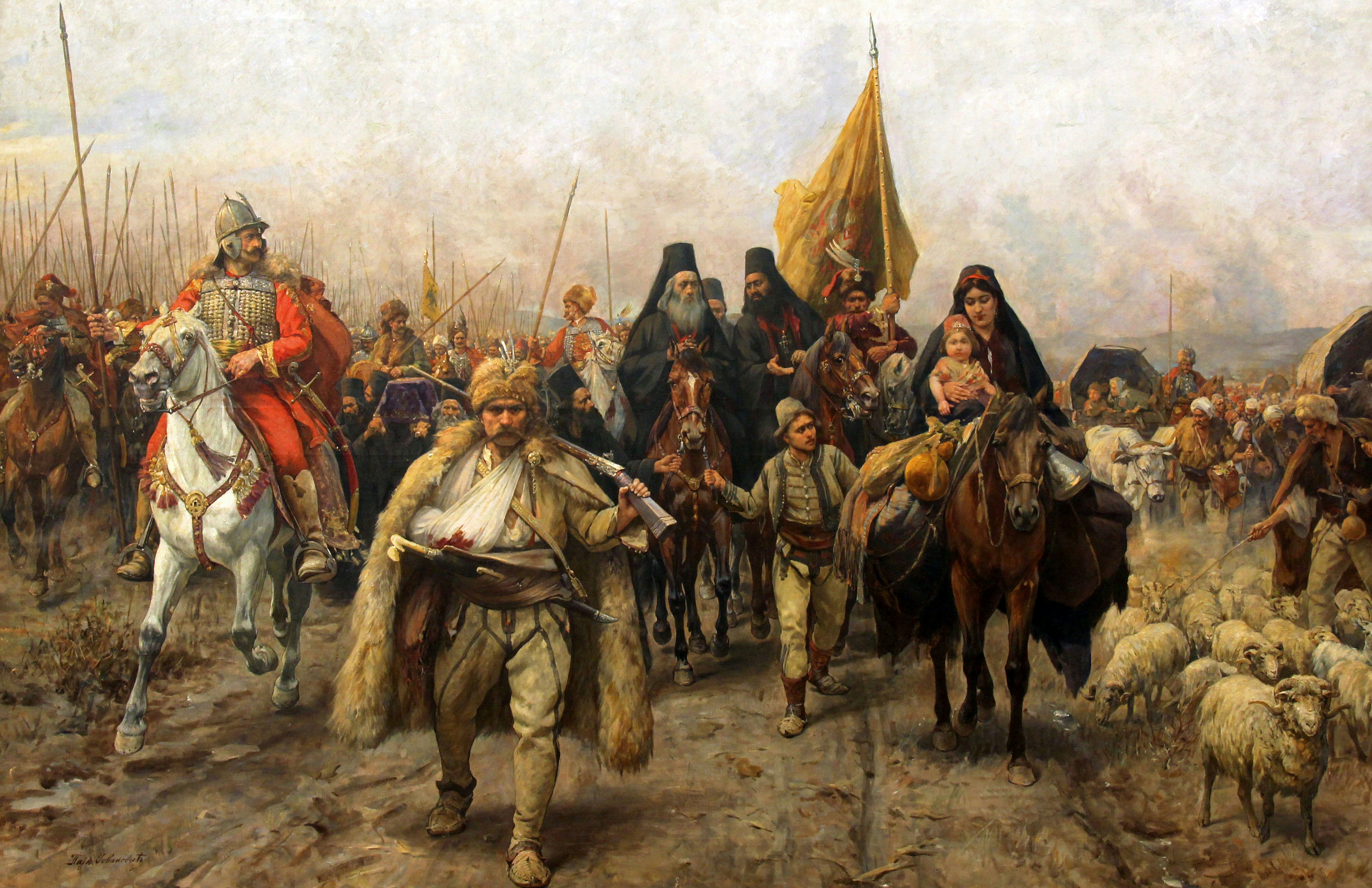
Great Migrations of the Serbs, a series of migrations from Ottoman- to Habsburg-ruled territories in the late 17th and early 18th centuries

After the loss of statehood to the Ottoman Empire, Serbian resistance continued in the northern regions. Between 1521 and 1552, the Ottomans conquered Belgrade and the regions of Syrmia, Bačka, and Banat. Wars and rebellions repeatedly challenged Ottoman rule, most notably the Banat Uprising of 1594–1595, which was part of the Long Turkish War between the Habsburg Empire and the Ottomans. The regions of Syrmia, Bačka, and Banat remained under Ottoman rule for about a century before being ceded to the Habsburgs, partially under the Treaty of Karlovci of 1699 and completely under the Treaty of Požarevac of 1718.

During the Great Turkish War, large parts of central and southern Serbia briefly came under Habsburg control. However, the Ottomans eventually reconquered the territory in 1689–1690, amid widespread violence and persecution of the civilian population. Tens of thousands of Serbs fled northwards to settle north of the Danube and Sava rivers towards present-day Vojvodina, Slavonia and the Military Frontier in a series of migrations known as the Great Migrations of the Serbs. The Habsburg Empire granted the settled Serbs a set of privileges, primarily guaranteeing them freedom of religion. As a consequence, the ecclesiastical centre of the Serbs also moved northwards to Karlovci with the establishment of the Metropolitanate of Karlovci, and the Patriarchate of Peć was once again abolished by the Ottomans in 1766. The Habsburgs occupied much of central Serbia from 1718 to 1739, establishing Serbia as a Habsburg crownland, before losing the territory under the Treaty of Belgrade in 1739, when the Ottomans retook the region.

=== Revolution and independence ===
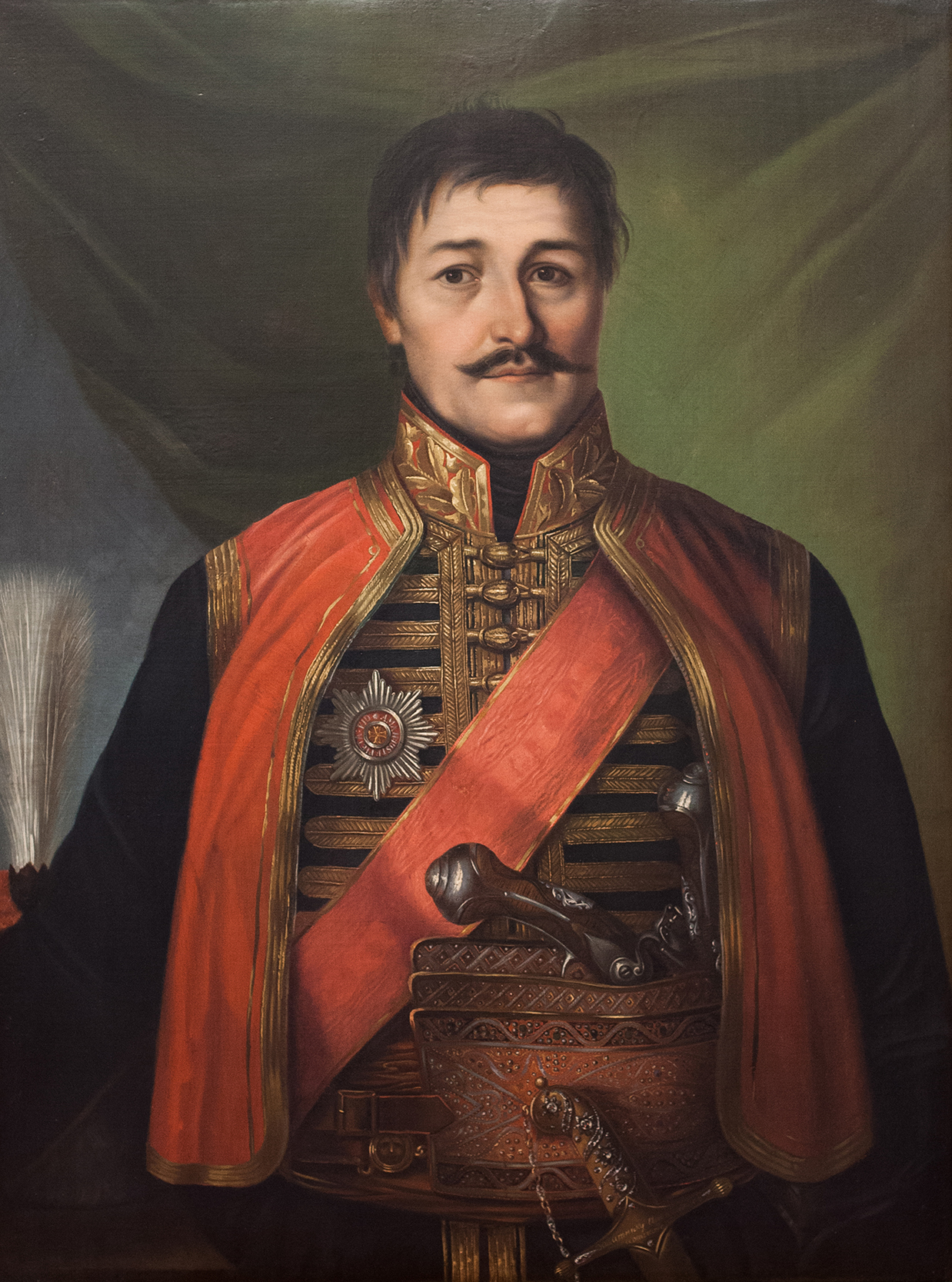
Karađorđe Petrović and Miloš Obrenović, leaders of the Serbian Revolution

The Serbian Revolution was a series of events spanning three decades, from 1804 to 1835, that resulted in the re-emergence of the Serbian state after centuries of Ottoman rule. The first part of the period, from 1804 to 1817, was marked by two armed uprisings. During the First Serbian Uprising, led by Karađorđe Petrović, insurrectionists established de facto independence for almost a decade before the Ottomans regained control of the territory. The Second Serbian Uprising began in 1815 under the leadership of Miloš Obrenović and eventually ended with a compromise that recognized Ottoman sovereignty while granting limited autonomy to the nascent Principality of Serbia. The later period saw the peaceful consolidation of Serbia's autonomy, culminating in the recognition of hereditary rule for the Serbian princes in 1830 and 1833 and the adoption of the first constitution in 1835 which formally prohibited serfdom, thus making Serbia the first nation in Eastern Europe to abolish feudalism.

The last Ottoman garrisons left in 1867, while a new constitution was enacted in 1869 without consulting the Ottoman government; taken together, these developments marked Serbia's de facto independence. In 1876, Serbia went to war with the Ottoman Empire, siding with the ongoing Herzegovina uprising, a revolt of ethnic Serbs in Bosnia and Herzegovina against Ottoman rule. The wars were militarily inconclusive and ended with the Congress of Berlin in 1878, which formally recognized Serbia's independence. The provisions of the treaty granted Serbia relatively modest territorial gains, while preventing the unification of Bosnia and Herzegovina with Serbia by placing the region under Austro-Hungarian administration while retaining nominal Ottoman sovereignty. Shortly after international recognition of its independence, in 1882, Serbia was proclaimed a kingdom under the rule of the House of Obrenović, which had ruled the principality for most of its existence. The rival House of Karađorđević, descendants of the revolutionary leader Karađorđe Petrović, assumed power in 1903 following the May Coup.

=== Balkan Wars and World War I ===
Serbia together with Greece, Montenegro and Bulgaria formed the Balkan League and went to war with the Ottoman Empire in 1912–13 in what became known as the First Balkan War. They defeated the Ottomans and captured most of its European territories, enabling Serbia to expand into the regions of Raška, Kosovo, and Vardar Macedonia. The Second Balkan War soon followed when Bulgaria, dissatisfied with the division of Macedonia, attacked its former allies Serbia and Greece but was defeated. Within two years, Serbia had enlarged its territory by 80% and its population by 50%.

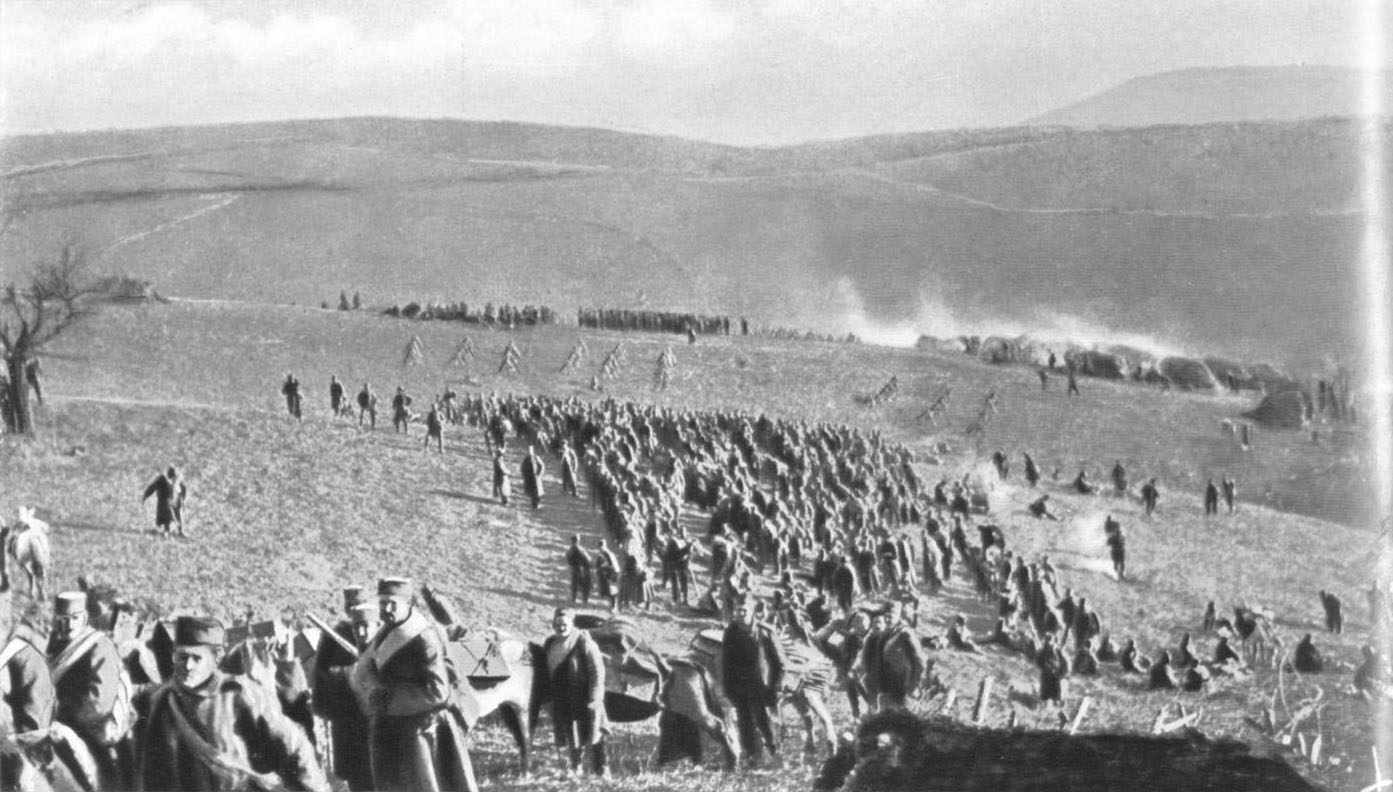
Battle of Cer in 1914, the first major Allied victory of World War I

Archduke Franz Ferdinand, heir presumptive to the Austro-Hungarian throne, was assassinated by Bosnian Serb student Gavrilo Princip in Sarajevo on 28 June 1914, in an act intended to end Austro-Hungarian rule in Bosnia and Herzegovina. The assassination ultimately led to Austria-Hungary declaring war on Serbia and the outbreak of World War I. The Serbian Army repelled two Austro-Hungarian invasion attempts in 1914, with the Austro-Hungarian Army's defeat described as one of the great upsets in modern military history. The third campaign was launched almost a year later under German command, when German, Austro-Hungarian, and Bulgarian forces invaded Serbia from three sides, occupying and dividing the country into two zones of occupation: an Austro-Hungarian zone west of the Great Morava and a Bulgarian zone to the east. Serbia, however, refused to capitulate, and the Serbian Army and state apparatus instead undertook the Great Retreat through Montenegro and Albania to the island of Corfu in Greece, suffering immense losses along the way. After recuperating there for several months, the Serbian Army was deployed in the summer of 1916 to the Macedonian Front and joined the Allied Army of the Orient. Alongside French, British, and Greek forces, it fought a two-year trench war against Bulgarian and German forces. In September 1918, Allied forces, spearheaded by Serbian troops, broke through the German and Bulgarian defences, forcing Bulgaria to withdraw from the war and German troops to fall back, resulting in the liberation of Serbia. The country suffered the highest casualty rate in World War I, accounting for 8% of total Allied military deaths, while approximately 58% of the Serbian military perished during the war. The total number of Serbian fatalities has been estimated at around 700,000, representing more than 16% of Serbia's prewar population.

=== Kingdom of Yugoslavia ===
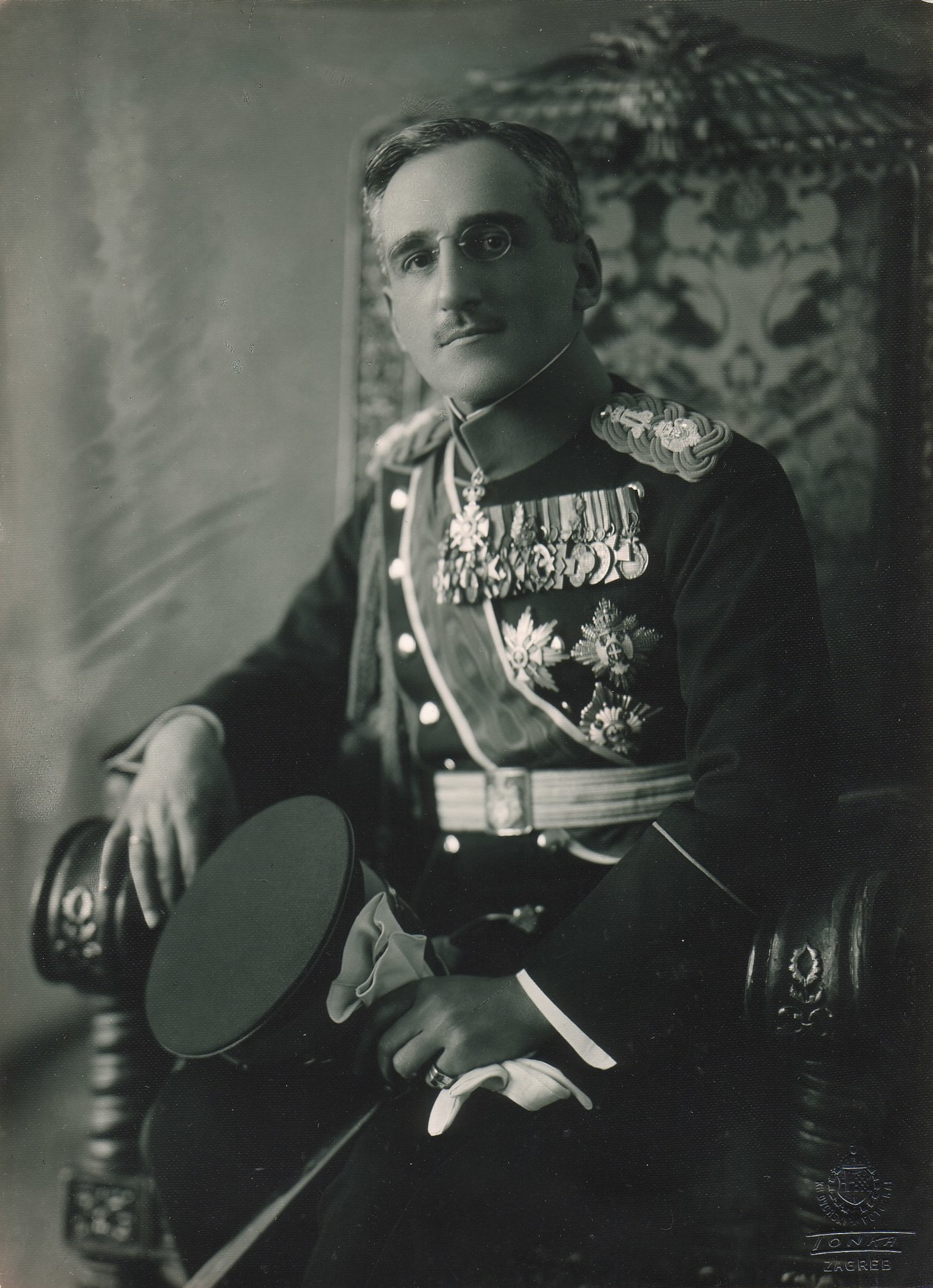
Alexander I, king of Yugoslavia from 1921 to 1934

During the war, Serbia declared the unification of the South Slavs into a common South Slavic, "Yugoslav", state as one of its war aims and negotiated the Corfu Declaration with the Yugoslav Committee, an ad hoc group representing the interests of South Slavs living in Austria-Hungary, which outlined the principles for establishing the future state.

The creation of Yugoslavia was preceded by a series of proclamations of unification with Serbia as Austria-Hungary collapsed in late 1918. First, Syrmia united with Serbia, followed by the declaration of the Great National Assembly in Novi Sad unifying Banat, Bačka and Baranya with Serbia. Finally, the Podgorica Assembly deposed the Montenegrin ruling house of Petrović-Njegoš and declared the unification of Montenegro with Serbia.

On 1 December 1918, the Kingdom of Serbs, Croats, and Slovenes was proclaimed in Belgrade under the rule of the House of Karađorđević and, two years later, constitutionally established as a unitary state. Serb unitarists and Croat autonomists clashed in parliament, while most governments were fragile and short-lived. In 1929, King Alexander I established a dictatorship aimed at creating a single Yugoslav nation and changed the country's name to Yugoslavia, but the dictatorship ultimately further alienated its non-Serb population from the idea of Yugoslav unity. King Alexander I was assassinated in 1934, after which the policy of integral Yugoslavism was gradually abandoned in favour of a compromise between Serbs and Croats, culminating in the Cvetković–Maček Agreement of 1939, which established the autonomous Banovina of Croatia in response to Croatian demands for greater autonomy.

=== World War II ===
Under pressure from Nazi Germany and following failed attempts to maintain neutrality, Yugoslavia acceded to the Tripartite Pact on 25 March 1941. The following day, mass protests broke out in Belgrade against the accession. Two days after the agreement had been signed, the Yugoslav government was overthrown in a military coup. In response to the coup, the Axis invaded Yugoslavia and swiftly conquered it.

Most of the territory of modern-day Serbia was placed under German military administration as the Territory of the Military Commander in Serbia. The remainder was divided between Hungary (Bačka), Bulgaria (southeastern Serbia), and Italy (Raška), as well as the Axis-puppet states of the Independent State of Croatia (Syrmia) and Albania (Kosovo). Appointed by the German Military Commander in Serbia, the collaborationist Government of National Salvation, led by General Milan Nedić, was responsible for domestic administration under German supervision.

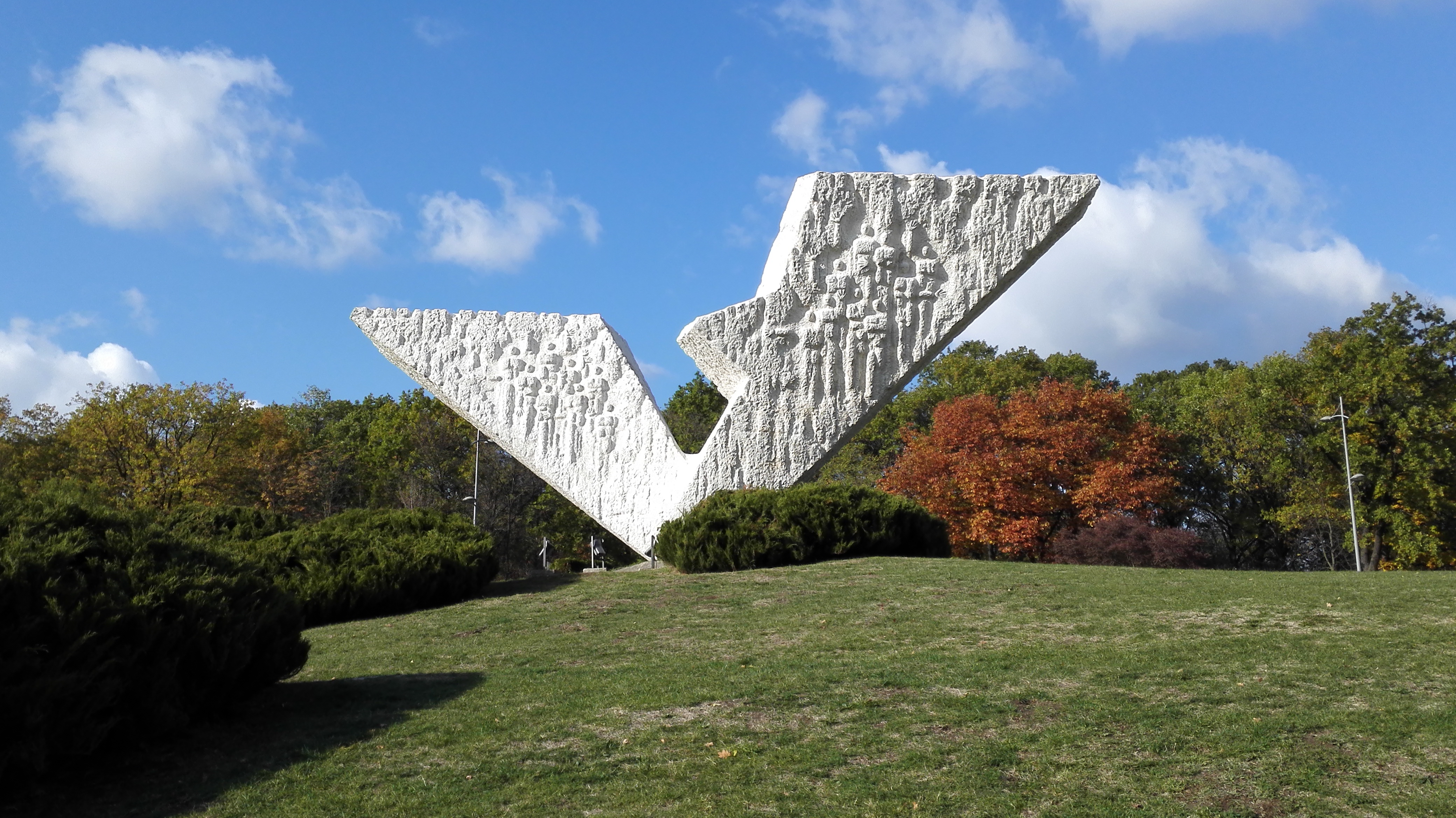
The Interrupted Flight monument, part of Šumarice Memorial Park, commemorating children killed by German forces during the Kragujevac massacre in 1941

The uprising in Serbia began in the summer of 1941, with two resistance movements emerging: the communist-led Partisans, led by Josip Broz Tito, and the royalist Chetniks, loyal to the government-in-exile and led by Colonel Draža Mihailović. The Partisans established the Republic of Užice, a short-lived military mini-state in western Serbia that constituted the largest liberated territory in German-occupied Europe at the time. The Germans responded in the autumn of 1941 with a series of mass reprisals against the civilian population, including the Kragujevac massacre, in which 2,794 people were killed; the Kraljevo massacre, with around 2,000 civilian victims; and the Draginac massacre (sr), in which 2,677 people were killed. Those actions led to the passivization of the Chetnik resistance in Serbia, while the Užice Republic was overrun by the German forces, forcing the majority of the Partisans to withdraw to the territories of the present-day Bosnia-Herzegovina and Croatia; the remaining Partisans confined their activities to small-scale attacks and sabotage.

Meanwhile, around 16,000 Jews were murdered, representing around 90% of the pre-war Jewish population. At the same time, tens of thousands of ethnic Serbs fled the Independent State of Croatia and sought refuge in German-occupied Serbia to escape the large-scale persecution and genocide perpetrated by the Ustaše regime. The number of ethnic Serb victims of the Ustaše regime has been estimated between 300,000 and 350,000.

After the tumultuous first year of the war, Serbia remained relatively calm until the autumn of 1944, when Soviet forces advanced into the Balkans from Romania. By late 1944, most of Serbia had been liberated in the Belgrade Offensive by the Soviet Red Army, supported by the Bulgarian Army and the Yugoslav Partisans. The offensive decisively shifted the balance in favour of the Partisans, who afterwards gained control of Yugoslavia. Serbia suffered heavy losses in World War II, although on a smaller scale than during World War I, with total war-related deaths estimated at 273,000.

=== Socialist Yugoslavia ===
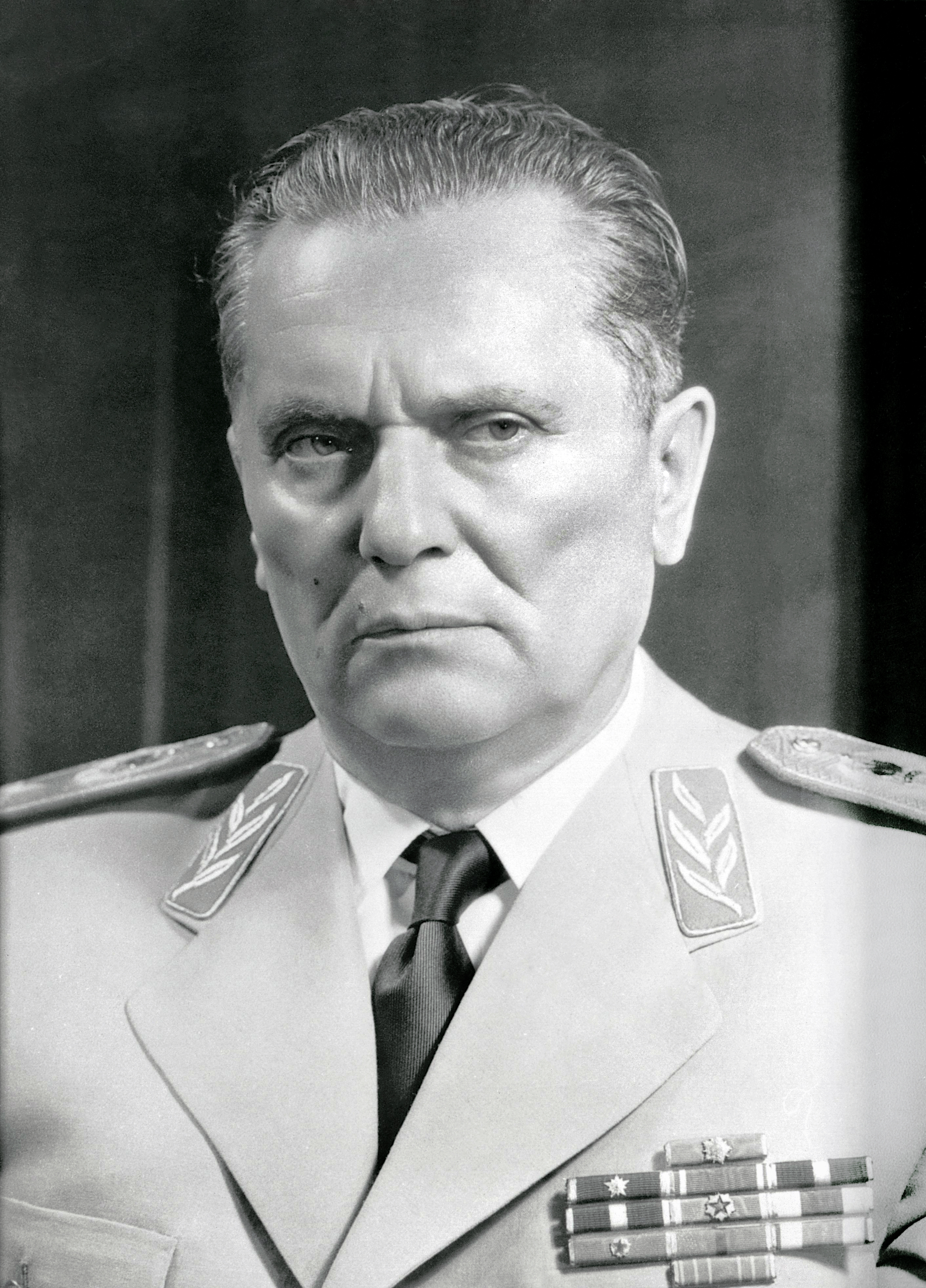
Josip Broz Tito, prime minister and president of Yugoslavia from 1945 to 1980

The liberation of Yugoslavia and victory of the Communist Partisans resulted in the abolition of the monarchy and the proclamation of the republic. A one-party state was established under the rule of the Communist Party of Yugoslavia, led by Josip Broz Tito, who ruled the country from 1944 until his death in 1980, first as prime minister and later as the president.

After ceasing to exist as a distinct political entity in the Kingdom of Yugoslavia, Serbia was re-established as one of the six constituent republics of the Yugoslav federation, known as the People's Republic of Serbia. Within Serbia two autonomous provinces were created, Kosovo and Vojvodina. In addition to the three constituent peoples of the monarchical era – Serbs, Croats, and Slovenes – the federal structure provided for the recognition of three new constituent peoples: Macedonians and Montenegrins in the late 1940s, and "Muslims" (predecessor to the modern Bosniak ethnicity) in the late 1960s. Each was associated with a respective constituent republic: Macedonia, Montenegro, and Bosnia and Herzegovina.

In foreign policy, socialist Yugoslavia sided with the Eastern Bloc at the beginning of the Cold War but pursued a policy of non-alignment following the Tito–Stalin split in 1948.

Domestically, two underlying tendencies prevailed throughout this period: centralization, which was dominant until the 1960s and generally supported by Serbia, and decentralization, advocated by Slovenia and Croatia, which gained prominence from the late 1960s and led to the adoption of the 1974 Yugoslav Constitution. The constitution strengthened the constituent republics and weakened the federal centre, transforming the country into a loose federation. It introduced extensive powers for the provinces, which acquired a status comparable to that of the republics while remaining constitutionally part of Serbia. In 1981, violent protests erupted in Kosovo, with Kosovo Albanians demanding that the province be granted the status of a constituent republic. This further intensified tensions over the constitutional position of Serbia, whose leadership had already criticized the 1974 Constitution for weakening the republic's authority over its autonomous provinces and called for its revision.

=== Breakup of Yugoslavia and political transition ===
Slobodan Milošević, who had taken control of the League of Communists of Serbia in 1987, became president of Serbia in 1989, promising to reduce the powers of the provinces of Kosovo and Vojvodina and to reform the ineffective system of consensus at the federal level, epitomized by the collective federal presidency established after Tito's death. A series of protests known as the Anti-bureaucratic revolution led to Milošević's allies coming to power in the provinces and Montenegro. This effectively gave Milošević and the Serbian leadership control over four of the eight members of the federal presidency, heightening tensions with the communist leaderships of the other republics, which feared renewed centralization. Serbia adopted a new constitution in 1990, which abolished the provinces' autonomy in all but name. In response, Kosovo Albanians, who constituted an overwhelming majority of the population of Kosovo, declared the Republic of Kosova, an unrecognized quasi-state, although Serbia retained full control and jurisdiction over the territory.

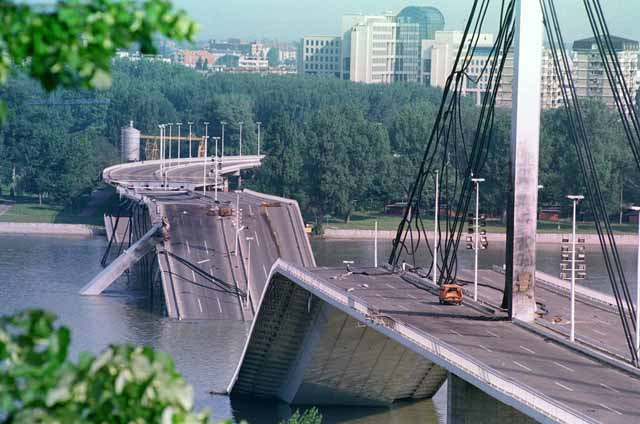
The Liberty Bridge in Novi Sad, damaged during the NATO bombing campaign in 1999

In parallel with the collapse of communism in Eastern Europe, the League of Communists of Yugoslavia disintegrated in early 1990, leading to the dismantling of the one-party system, with the first multiparty elections held at the level of the individual republics rather than at the federal level later that year. In Serbia, the League of Communists of Serbia, which merged with the Socialist Alliance of Working People of Serbia to form the Socialist Party of Serbia in 1990, won the first multiparty elections and remained in power throughout the 1990s. In all the other republics, with the exception of Montenegro, nationalist parties advocating independence won decisive victories and formed new non-communist leaderships that sought independence for their respective republics.

Yugoslavia subsequently broke up, with Slovenia, Croatia, and Macedonia declaring independence in 1991, Bosnia and Herzegovina following suit in 1992, while Serbia and Montenegro remained together as the Federal Republic of Yugoslavia, later renamed the State Union of Serbia and Montenegro. The Yugoslav Wars erupted, with the most severe conflicts taking place in Croatia and Bosnia-Herzegovina, where the large ethnic Serb communities opposed independence from Yugoslavia. Although avoiding direct full-scale involvement, Serbia supported the Serbs in Croatia by providing supplies and volunteers, while serving as a mobilization base for the Yugoslav People's Army and a rear base for its military operations in eastern Croatia. In Bosnia and Herzegovina, Serbia's involvement was more limited, although it provided logistical, military, and financial support to Bosnian Serbs.

In response to the country's involvement in the wars in Croatia and Bosnia, the UN imposed sanctions unprecedented in scale against Serbia and Montenegro in 1992, which isolated the country by banning international trade, air and sea travel, shipments to and from the country, scientific and technical cooperation, cultural exchanges, and the participation of sporting teams in international competitions. The sanctions had devastating effects on the economy, leading to its rapid collapse: GDP more than halved in just one year, while hyperinflation reached one of the highest rates ever recorded. Most of the sanctions were lifted in 1996 following the signing of the Dayton Agreement, which ended the conflict in Bosnia.

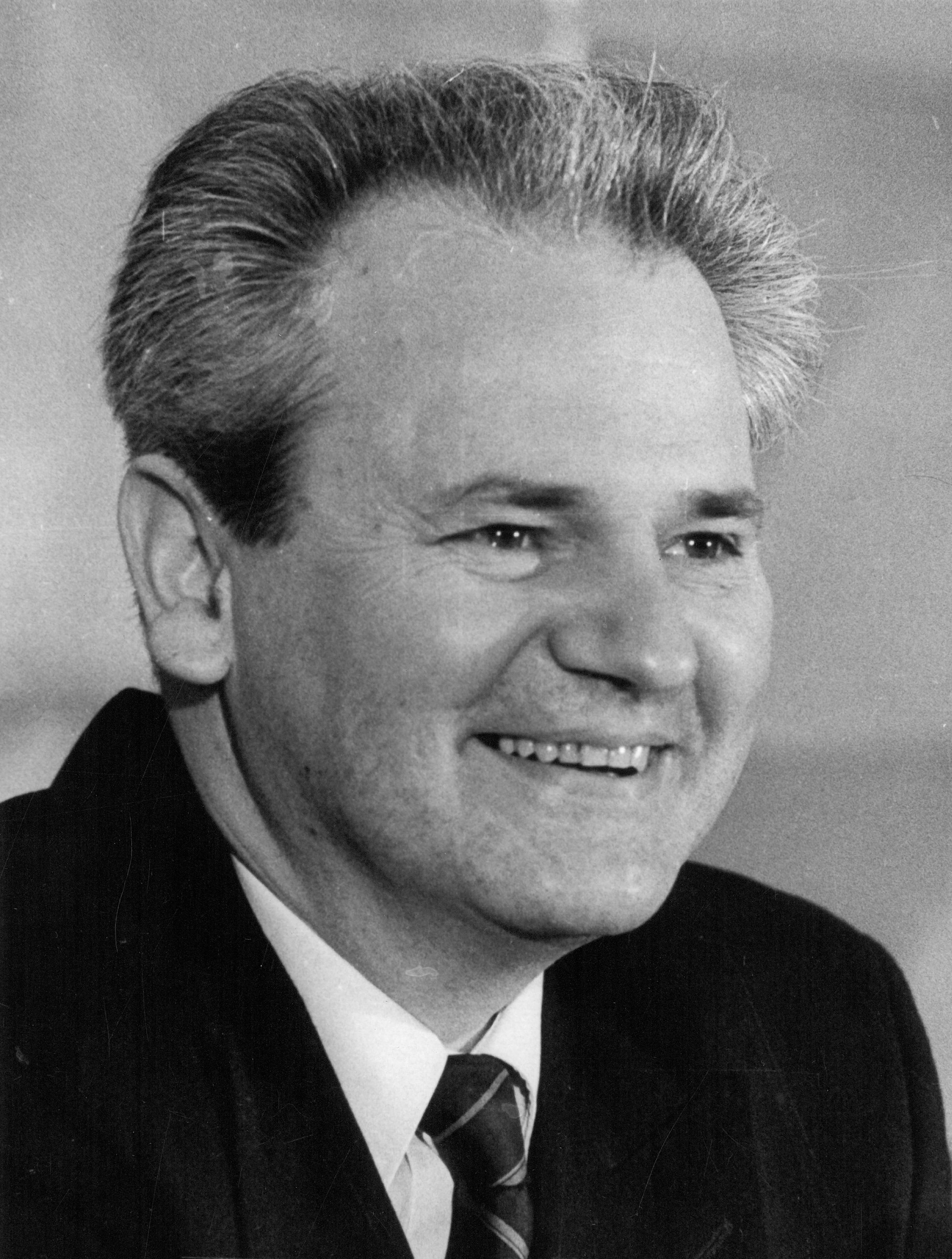
Slobodan Milošević, president of Serbia (1989–1997) and of FR Yugoslavia (1997–2000)

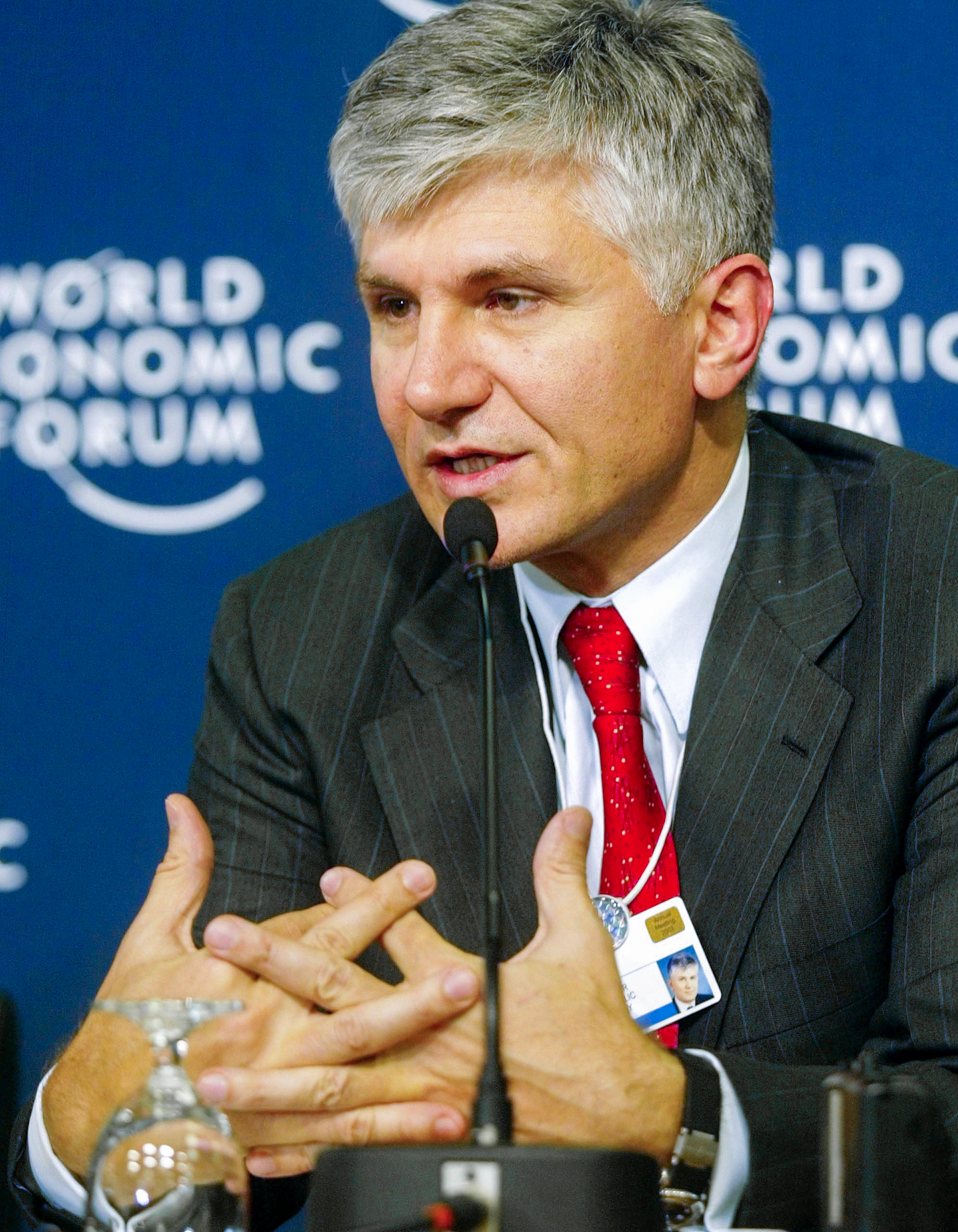
Zoran Đinđić, prime minister of Serbia (2001–2003)

The situation in Kosovo remained relatively calm throughout much of the decade, until continued clashes between the Albanian guerrilla Kosovo Liberation Army and Serbian security forces escalated into the Kosovo War, during which NATO intervened and conducted a 78-day aerial campaign that, in addition to targeting military sites and installations, caused extensive damage to the country's transport and energy infrastructure. It led to the withdrawal of the Serbian state institutions from the province and the establishment of a UN interim administration, accompanied by the displacement of much of the Kosovo Serb population.

The overthrow of Slobodan Milošević in 2000 ended Serbia and Montenegro's international isolation. The country embarked on democratic and economic reforms, accompanied by strong economic growth. The political climate, however, remained tense as it dealt with the legacy of the 1990s, including proceedings before the International Criminal Tribunal for the former Yugoslavia, to which much of the country's former political and military leadership, including Milošević, was extradited for trial. The reformist prime minister Zoran Đinđić was assassinated in 2003 as the result of a plot originating from organized crime and former security officials.

The State Union of Serbia and Montenegro was dissolved in 2006 following a referendum in Montenegro, in which 55% voted in favour of independence, resulting in the restoration of Serbia as an independent state. In 2008, Kosovo declared independence, ending the UN interim administration. Serbia opposed the move, considering it illegal and illegitimate, and continues to regard Kosovo as its province while pursuing a sustained diplomatic policy aimed at limiting Kosovo's international recognition and participation in international organizations.

=== Recent period ===
In 2012, the Serbian Progressive Party (SNS) of Aleksandar Vučić came to power. Under successive SNS-led governments, Serbia experienced democratic backsliding towards authoritarianism, accompanied by a decline in media freedom and civil liberties.

Serbia saw a series of mass nationwide protests in the 2020s, including the environmental protests in 2021 and 2022 against proposed lithium mine in western Serbia, the "Serbia Against Violence" protests in 2023 in response to the Belgrade school shooting and the Mladenovac and Smederevo mass shootings. Amid two years of anti-corruption protests, following the Novi Sad railway station canopy collapse in 2024, the National Assembly was dissolved, a snap parliamentary election was called and Vučić subsequently resigned as president. In the 2026 election, the opposition Student List, which emerged from the protest movement, defeated the ruling SNS, bringing an end to its fourteen-year rule.

== Geography ==
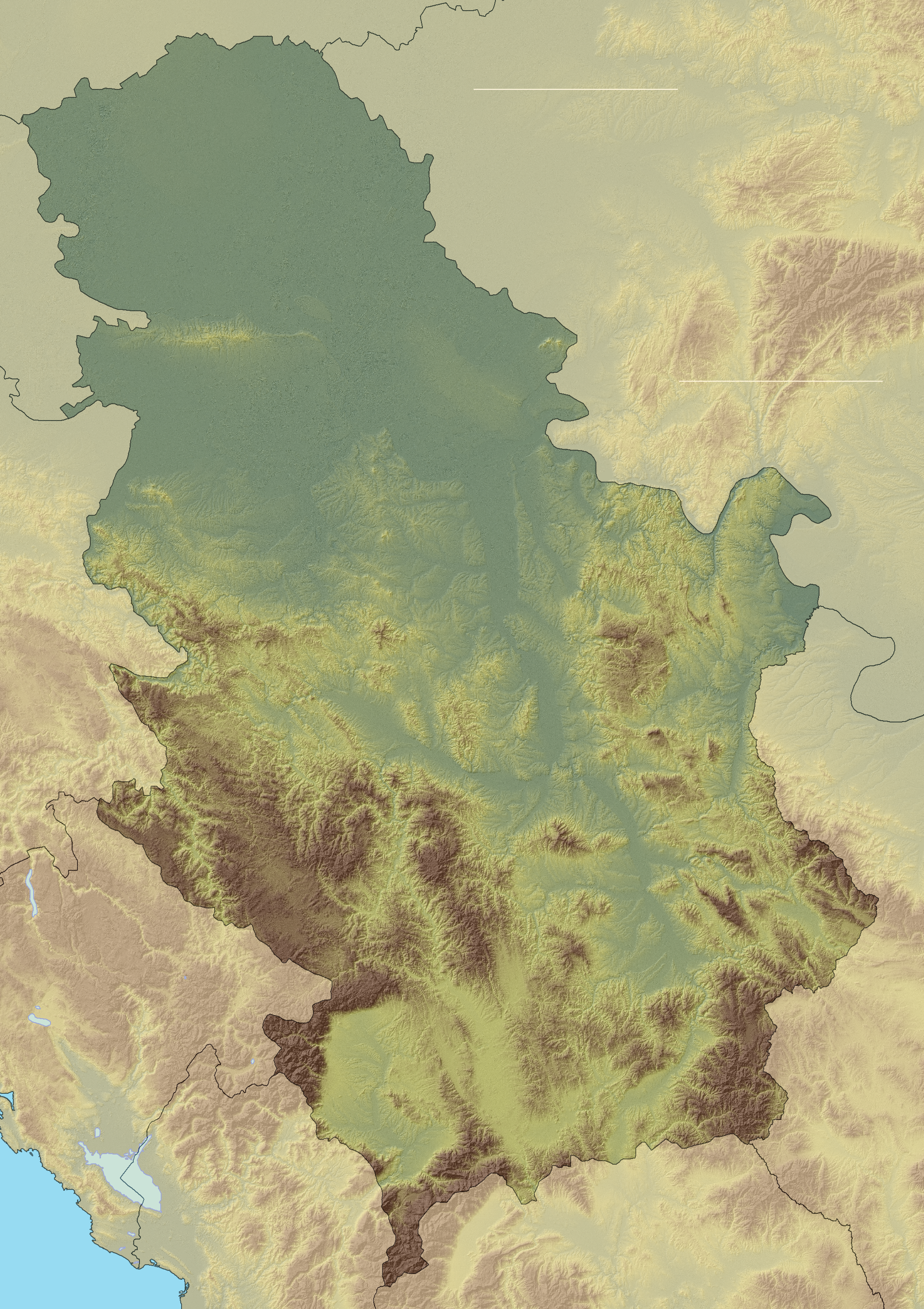
Topographic map of Serbia (Note: Including Kosovo)

Serbia is situated on the Balkans and in the Pannonian Basin, lying between latitudes 41° and 47° N, and longitudes 18° and 23° E. The country covers a total area of 88,499 km² (34,170 sq mi), including the disputed territory of Kosovo, or 77,589 km² (29,957 sq mi), excluding Kosovo.

With eight neighbouring countries, Serbia shares borders with more countries than any other European country except Germany, tying with Austria for second place. Its total border length is 2,027 km (1,260 mi), whether Kosovo is included or excluded: Albania 115 km (71 mi), Bosnia and Herzegovina 302 km (188 mi), Bulgaria 318 km (198 mi), Croatia 241 km (150 mi), Hungary 151 km (94 mi), North Macedonia 221 km (137 mi), Montenegro 203 km (126 mi) and Romania 476 km (296 mi). The border with Albania and parts of the borders with North Macedonia and Montenegro (159 km/99 mi and 78 km/49 mi, respectively) remain disputed, as following Kosovo's declaration of independence, many countries recognized these sections as part of Kosovo's international boundary. Consequently, the 352 km (219 mi) border between Serbia and Kosovo is treated either as an "administrative line" by Serbia and non-recognizing states, or as an international border by Kosovo and those that recognize its independence.

The Pannonian Plain covers the northern third of the country (the regions of Bačka, Banat, Syrmia and Mačva), while the easternmost part of Serbia, the Timok Valley, extends into the Wallachian Plain. The terrain of central Serbia consists chiefly of hills traversed by rivers. Mountains dominate the southern third of the country: the Dinaric Alps extend across the west and southwest, while the Carpathian and Balkan mountains extend in a north–south direction across the east, and the Rhodope Mountains cover the southeastern corner of the country. Elevation ranges from 2,169 metres (7,116 ft) at the Midžor peak in the Balkan Mountains to just 17 metres (56 ft) near Prahovo in the Timok Valley. Karst topography is prominent in the Dinaric Alps and Carpathian Mountains with the country hosting about 1,500 caves, ten of which are longer than 2,000 m (6,561 ft).

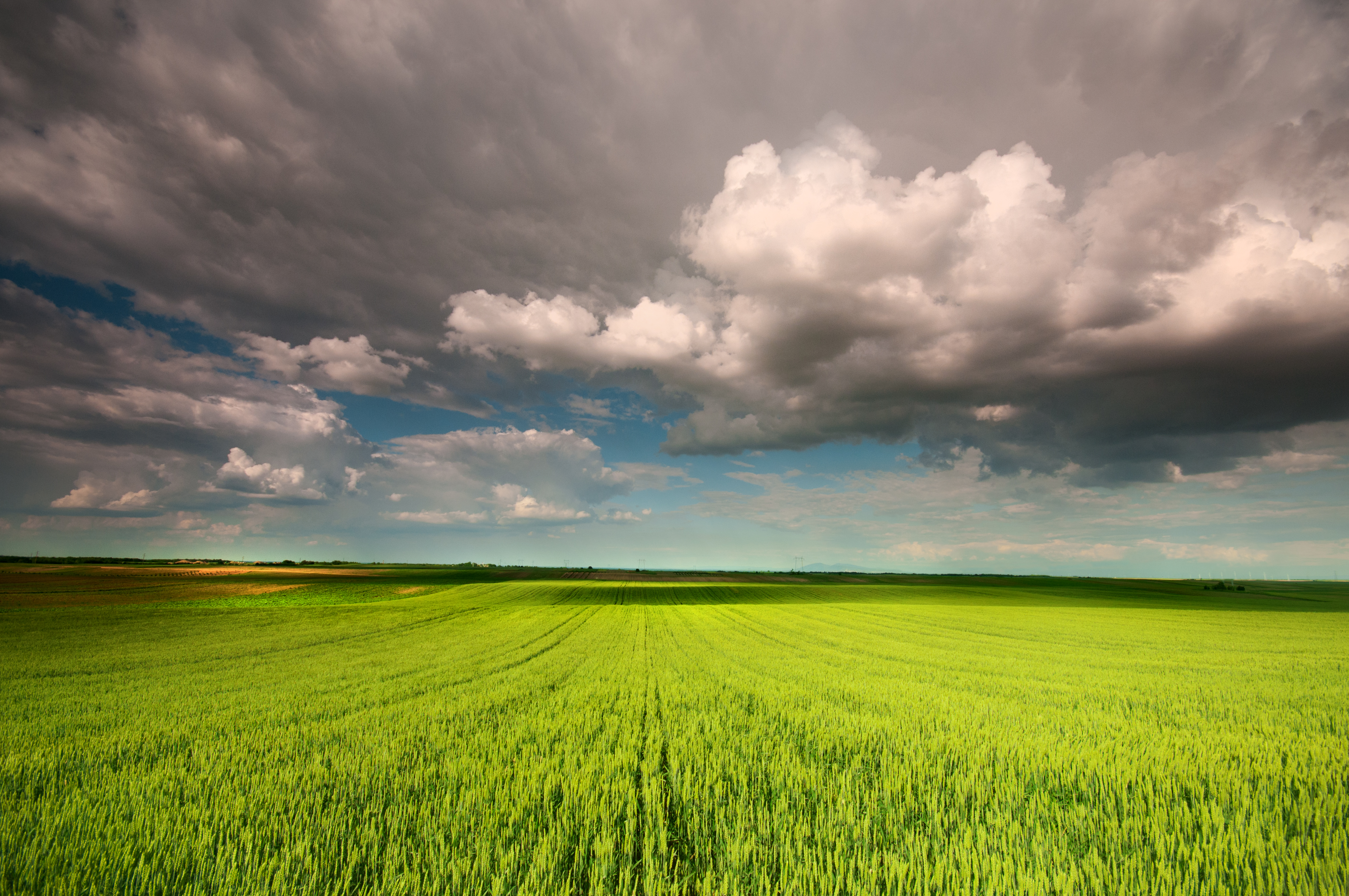
Pannonian Plain in Banat

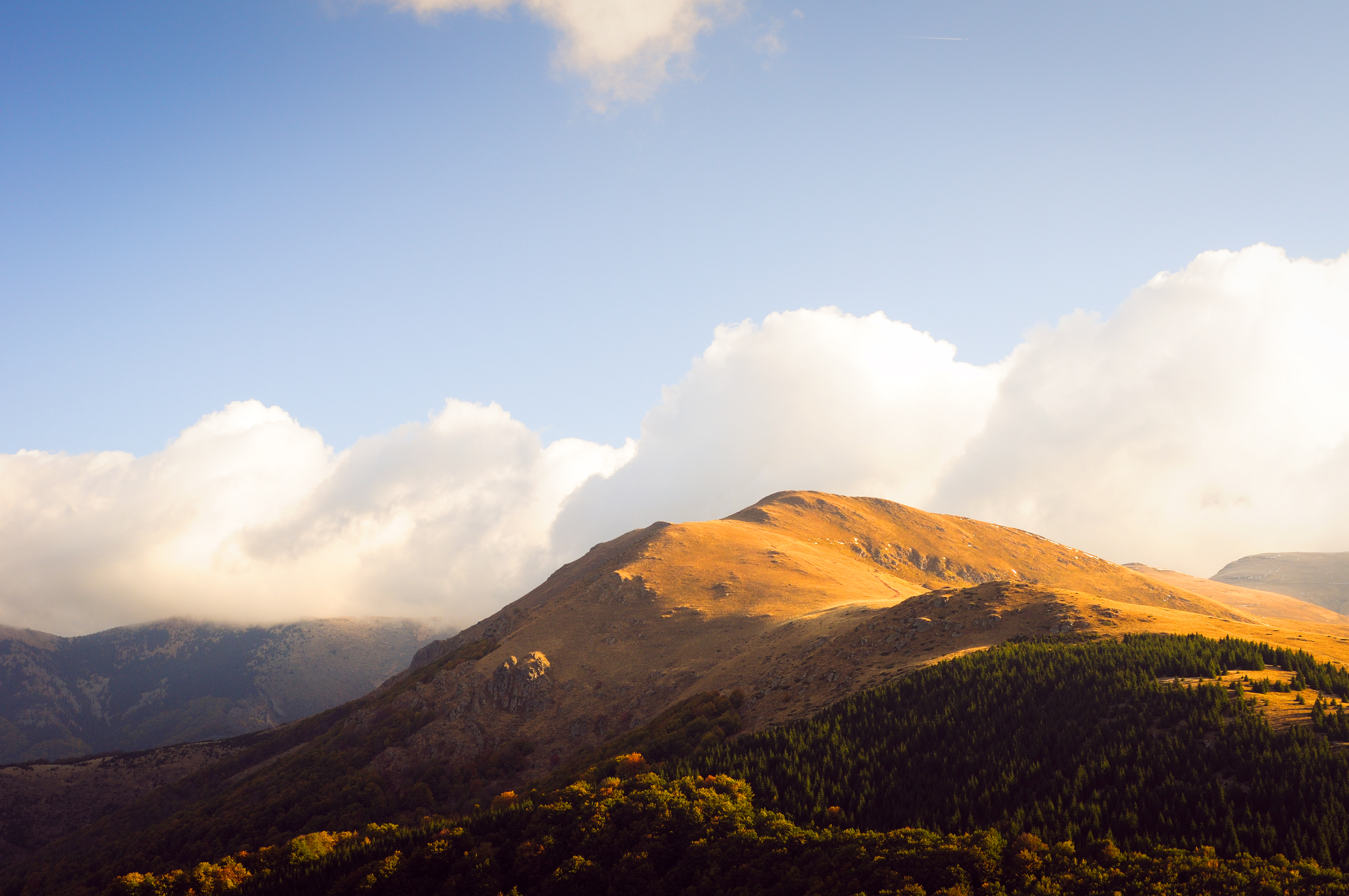
Midžor, the highest peak in the country (Note: Excluding Kosovo)

Almost the entire territory of Serbia belongs to the Black Sea drainage basin, except for the river Pčinja, which flows into the Aegean Sea. The Danube, the second-longest river in Europe, flows through Serbia for 588 kilometres, or about a fifth of its overall length, and represents the country's major source of fresh water. It is joined by its largest tributaries, the Great Morava (which, together with the West Morava, forms a 493 km (306 mi) river system, the longest entirely within Serbia), the Sava and the Tisza.

Due to the configuration of the terrain, natural lakes are sparse and small; most are located in the lowlands of the north of the country, such as the aeolian Lake Palić and numerous oxbow lakes along rivers. However, there are numerous artificial lakes, mostly dammed reservoirs, the largest being Đerdap Lake on the Danube, with an area of 163 km² (63 sq mi) on the Serbian side (a total area of 253 km² (98 sq mi) is shared with Romania), followed by Vlasina Lake in the southeast. The country has an abundance of mineral and hot springs, with more than a thousand sources.

=== Climate ===
Köppen climate classification map of Serbia (Note: Including Kosovo)

Serbia has a temperate climate, more precisely classified as a humid continental and humid subtropical climate. In the north, the climate is more continental, with cold winters and hot, humid summers, along with well-distributed rainfall. In the south, summers and autumns are drier, while winters are relatively cold, with heavy snowfall in the mountains and highlands. Differences in elevation, proximity to the large river basins, as well as exposure to winds, account for climate variations. The coldest part of the country is the Pešter plateau in the Dinaric Alps in the southwest, where winters are particularly harsh.

Mean monthly temperatures range between 0 °C (32 °F) in January and 22 °C (72 °F) in July. The lowest recorded temperature in Serbia was −39.5 °C (−39.1 °F), recorded on 13 January 1985 at Karajukića Bunari in Pešter, while the highest was 44.9 °C (112.8 °F), recorded on 24 July 2007 in Smederevska Palanka. One of the climatic features of Serbia is the Košava, a cold and very squally southeastern wind that originates in the Carpathian Mountains and follows the Danube northwest through the Iron Gates, where it gains a jet effect and continues to Belgrade, spreading as far south as Niš.

=== Biodiversity ===
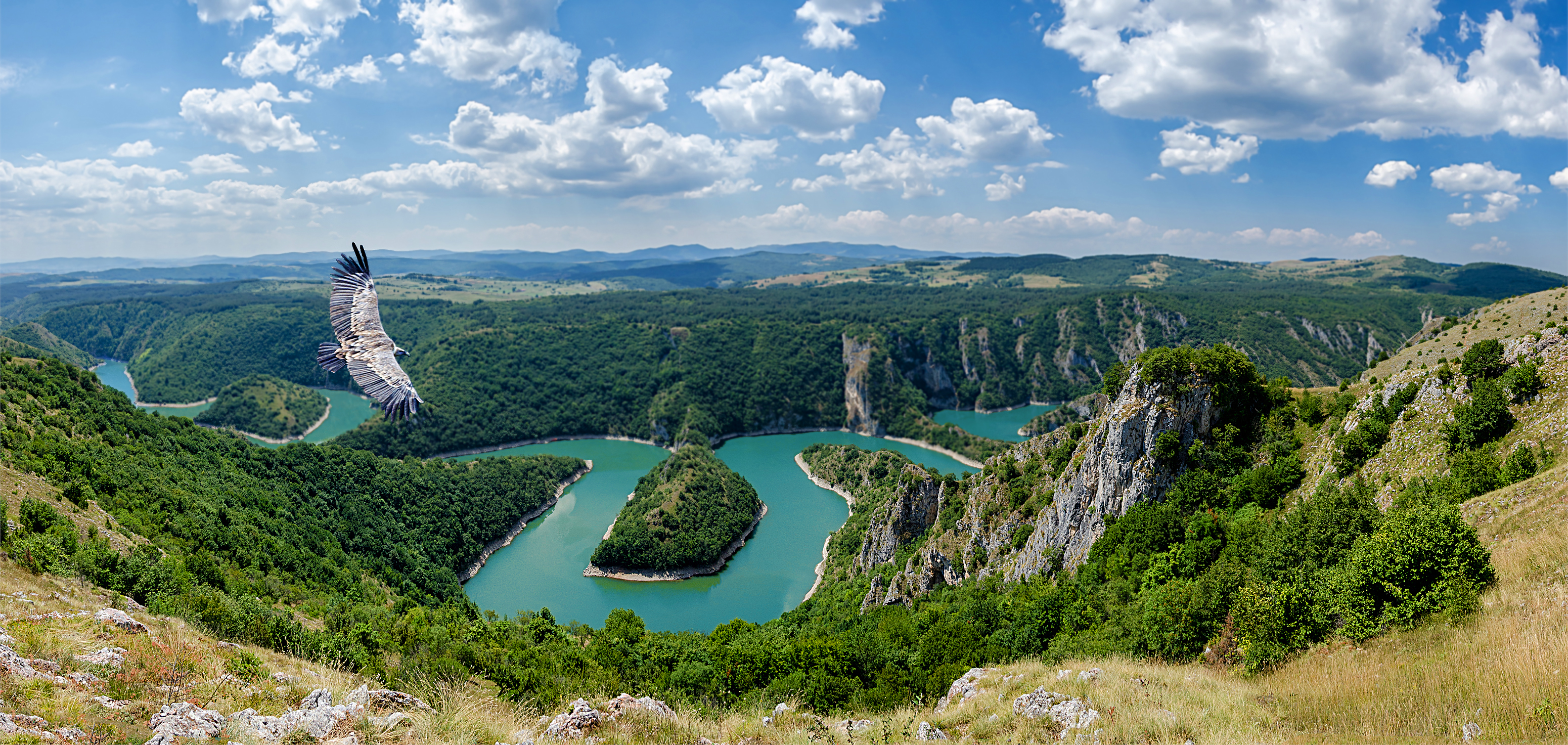
Uvac Nature Reserve, one of the last remaining habitats of the griffon vulture in Europe

Covering only 1.2% of Europe, (Note: Excluding Russia) Serbia is home to 39% of European vascular flora, 40% of reptile and amphibian fauna, 51% of fish fauna, 67% of mammal fauna, and 74% of European bird fauna. The area of Tara National Park is the last region in the country where brown bears can still roam free, while the Uvac Nature Reserve is considered one of the last habitats of the griffon vulture in Europe.

With 37% of its territory covered by forest, Serbia is considered a moderately forested country, compared with global forest coverage of 30% and the European average of 33%. The total forest area in Serbia is 2,854,596 hectares (7,053,860 acres), or about 0.4 hectares (1 acre) per inhabitant. The most common trees are beech, oak, pine, spruce, and fir. In addition to these, the country is also home to endemic species such as the Serbian spruce.

Serbia's biodiversity is conserved in 362 protected areas, encompassing 5,681 square kilometres (2,193 sq mi), or 7.3% of the country's territory. These include four national parks, 11 nature parks, 41 nature reserves, 10 "landscapes of outstanding features", 7 protected habitats, and 289 natural monuments.

== Government and politics ==
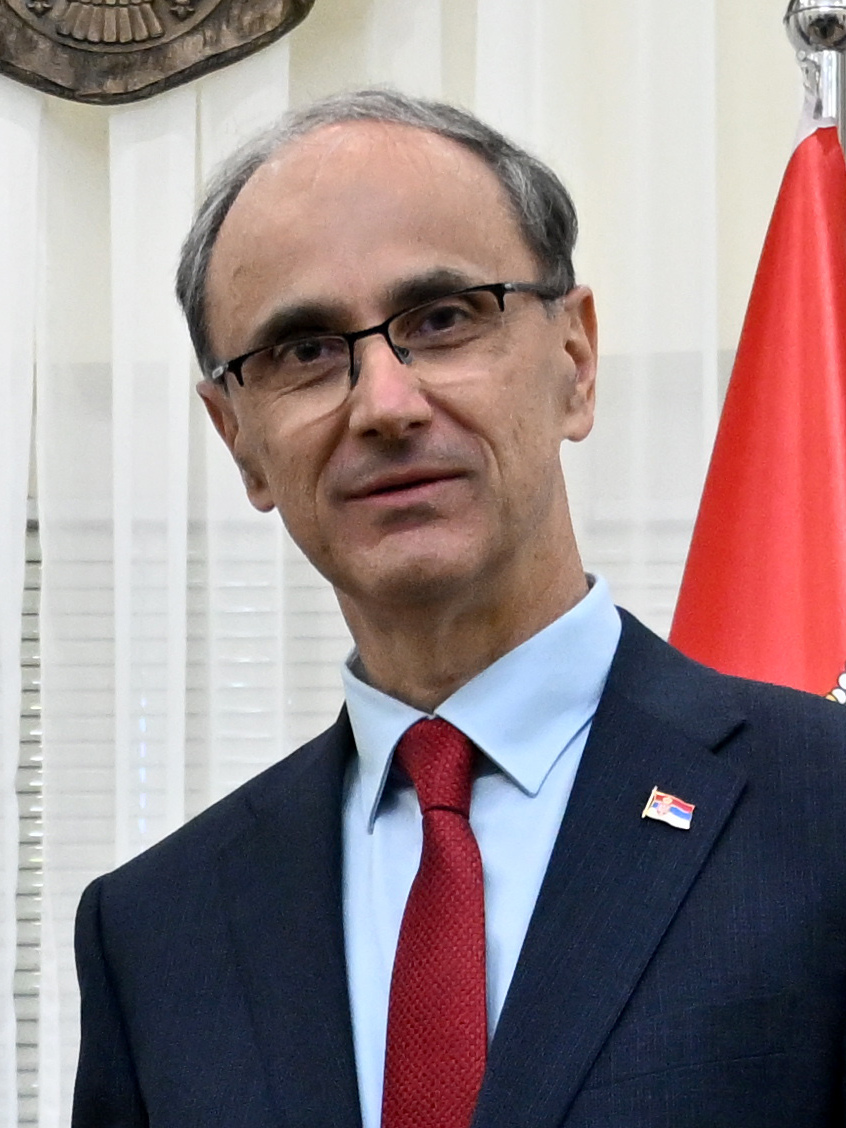
Đuro Macut, caretaker Prime Minister

Serbia is a parliamentary republic. The current constitution was adopted in 2006 following the dissolution of the State Union of Serbia and Montenegro. The Constitutional Court reviews the constitutionality of laws and other general acts.

The President is the head of state, elected by popular vote to a five-year term and limited to a maximum of two terms. In addition to being the commander-in-chief of the armed forces and representing the country in international affairs, the president has the procedural duty of proposing a candidate for prime minister to the parliament.

Executive power is primarily exercised by the Government, headed by the Prime Minister and composed of cabinet ministers. The government proposes legislation and the budget, executes laws, and determines and conducts domestic and foreign policy. Đuro Macut, prime minister since April 2025, continues to serve as head of government in a caretaker capacity following the 2026 election, pending the formation and swearing-in of a new government.

The National Assembly is a unicameral legislative body composed of 250 proportionally elected deputies who serve four-year terms. It has the power to enact laws, approve the budget, elect and dismiss the prime minister and other ministers, declare war, and ratify international treaties and agreements. Following the 2026 election, the Student List, an electoral list formed by the student protest movement, won an absolute majority with 53% of the vote and 140 seats in the National Assembly. The Serbian Progressive Party-led coalition finished second with 39% and 103 seats.

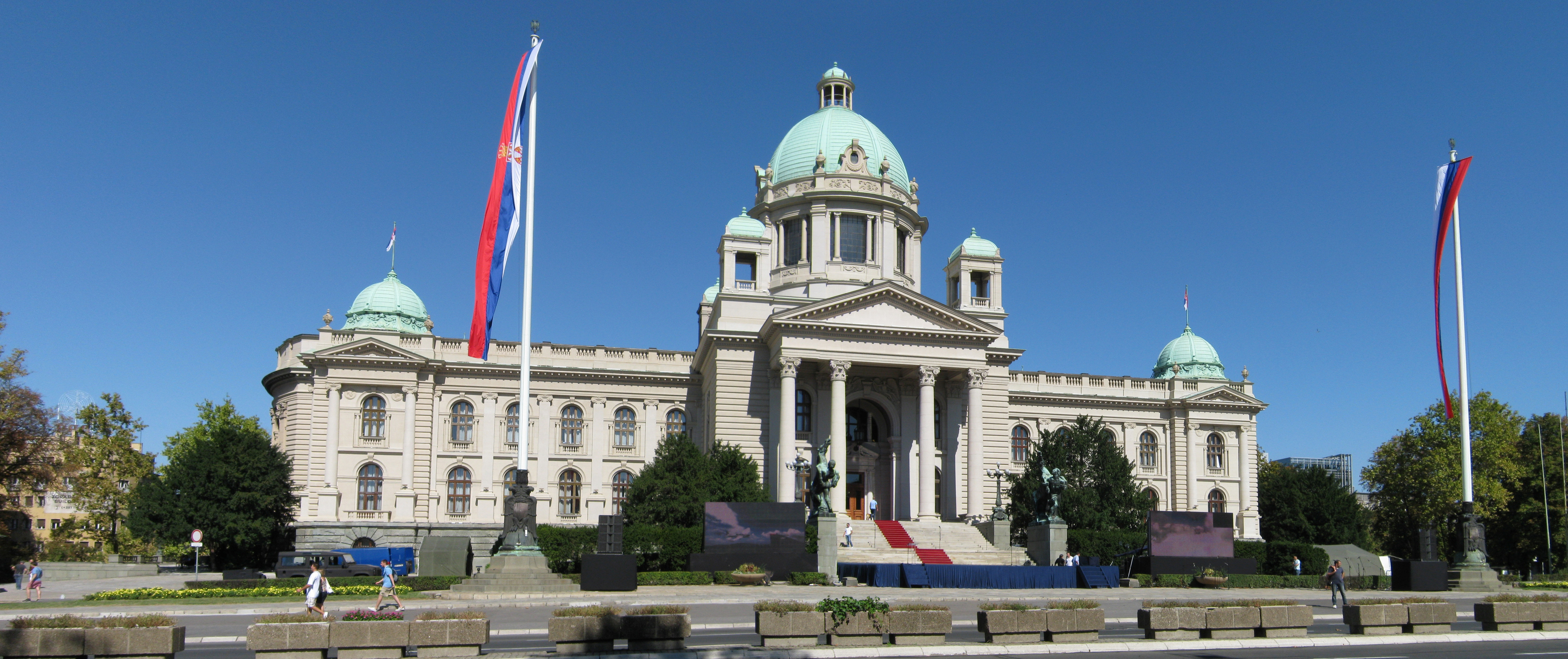
House of the National Assembly, seat of the legislature

The first political parties were established in the 1880s. The Progressive Party and People's Radical Party dominated political life in the Kingdom of Serbia, with the latter continuing its political influence in the Kingdom of Yugoslavia. After World War II, Serbia was re-established as a one-party state and a constituent republic of socialist Yugoslavia, governed by the League of Communists of Serbia. With the fall of communism in 1990, a multi-party system was restored. From 2012 until 2026, Serbian politics was dominated by the populist Serbian Progressive Party.

The country was classified as a "flawed democracy" and ranked 64th in the world in the 2024 Democracy Index.

=== Law and judicial system ===
Serbia has a typical civil law legal system. In the process of its accession to the European Union, the legal system is being progressively harmonized with the community acquis, which constitutes the body of European Union law.

The judiciary is organized as a three-tiered system comprising the Supreme Court as the court of last resort, appellate courts as courts at second instance, and basic and high courts at first instance. Courts of special jurisdiction include the Administrative Court, business courts (including the Business Appellate Court at second instance), and misdemeanour courts (including the Misdemeanour Appellate Court at second instance). The High Magistrate Council appoints all judges and oversees their disciplinary proceedings, while the High Prosecutorial Council appoints all public prosecutors and handles disciplinary proceedings concerning prosecutors.

Law enforcement is the responsibility of the Serbian Police. It performs general police duties, including criminal investigation, patrol activities, traffic policing, and border control.

=== Administrative divisions ===
Serbia is a unitary state comprising municipalities and cities, districts, and provinces.

There are 29 cities and 145 municipalities, (Note: Excluding Kosovo) which constitute the local government level. Cities, generally having more than 50,000 inhabitants, have their own assemblies, elected every four years in local elections, as well as a mayor, a budget and property. Municipalities usually have between 5,000 and 50,000 inhabitants, but are otherwise similar to cities, each having its own assembly, municipal president, budget and property.

There are 24 administrative districts, (Note: Excluding Kosovo) which serve as regional centres of state authority but have no powers of their own. They are purely administrative divisions of the state, with various local branches of state administration traditionally organized at the district level, including education districts, police territorial directorates, and high courts.

No.	District	Seat
1	Bor	Bor
2	Braničevo	Požarevac
3	City of Belgrade	Belgrade
4	Zaječar	Zaječar
5	West Bačka	Sombor
6	Zlatibor	Užice
7	Jablanica	Leskovac
8	South Banat	Pančevo
9	South Bačka	Novi Sad
10	Kolubara	Valjevo
11	Kosovo	Pristina
12	Kosovska Mitrovica	Kosovska Mitrovica
13	Kosovo-Pomoravlje	Gnjilane
14	Mačva	Šabac
15	Moravica	Čačak

No.	District	Seat
16	Nišava	Niš
17	Peć	Peć
18	Pirot	Pirot
19	Podunavlje	Smederevo
20	Pomoravlje	Jagodina
21	Prizren	Prizren
22	Pčinja	Vranje
23	Rasina	Kruševac
24	Raška	Kraljevo
25	North Banat	Kikinda
26	North Bačka	Subotica
27	Central Banat	Zrenjanin
28	Srem	Sremska Mitrovica
29	Toplica	Prokuplje
30	Šumadija	Kragujevac

The Constitution of Serbia recognizes two autonomous provinces: Vojvodina in the north and the disputed territory of Kosovo in the south, while the remaining area of Central Serbia has never had its own regional authority. Vojvodina has its own assembly and government, but with limited competencies, focused primarily on executive power, without substantive legislative jurisdiction. Following the Kosovo War, the Serbian state apparatus, including its military and police forces, was withdrawn from Kosovo, leading to the establishment of the UN interim administration. In 2008, Kosovo declared independence, a move strongly opposed by Serbia, which considers the declaration illegal and illegitimate and continues to claim the territory as its province, officially known as Kosovo and Metohija. The declaration received a mixed response from the international community, with 110 out of 193 UN member states recognizing its independence.

=== Foreign relations ===
Serbia has established diplomatic relations with 189 UN member states and two non-member observer states. It maintains a network of 78 embassies abroad and seven diplomatic missions to multilateral organizations, while hosting the embassies of 72 countries. Serbia is a member of the United Nations, the Council of Europe, the Organization for Security and Co-operation in Europe, and the International Monetary Fund, among other international organizations.

The country has pursued a multi-vector policy, balancing its relations with the European Union, Russia, the United States, and China.

Serbia's strategic goal remains eventual membership in the European Union, and the country has been negotiating its EU accession since 2014. Its accession process has been slow, with 22 of 35 negotiation chapters opened and only a few provisionally closed. Key obstacles include the "normalization" of relations with Kosovo, alignment of its foreign policy with that of the EU regarding Russia, and rule of law reforms. After initially enjoying strong public support, Serbia's EU accession has faced declining domestic approval over the past decade. Support for Serbia's accession among individual EU member states is similarly mixed, with concerns over Serbia's claim to Kosovo and its foreign policy non-alignment with regard to Russia.

States that have not recognized Kosovo as independent States that have recognized Kosovo as independent States that have recognized Kosovo as independent and later withdrawn recognition

Relations with Russia are often described as a "centuries-old religious, ethnic and political alliance". Russia has consistently provided diplomatic support to Serbia over the issue of Kosovo. Following the 2022 Russian invasion of Ukraine, Serbia drew international scrutiny for not joining international sanctions against Russia, citing its own past suffering with sanctions. It is the only European country, apart from Belarus, not to impose sanctions on Russia. However, Serbia voted to condemn the invasion, supporting the adoption of the UN resolution demanding that Russia withdraw its military forces from Ukraine, as well as supporting the suspension of Russia from the UN Human Rights Council.

The country maintains close diplomatic ties with China, with the two countries having developed a comprehensive strategic partnership. China has become a major creditor for infrastructure projects through the Belt and Road Initiative, while Chinese companies have invested heavily in Serbia, using the country as one of several springboards for expansion into European markets. Serbia follows the One China principle and considers Taiwan an "inalienable part" of China. Similarly, China provides strong diplomatic support to Serbia on the issue of Kosovo.

Relations with the United States have improved significantly from the low point of 1999 and the NATO bombing, although Serbia's refusal to recognize Kosovo's independence remains a point of contention, as does its balancing act between Western and non-Western powers, particularly Russia and China.

Serbia's relations with neighbouring countries are generally friendly, although ties with some of the former Yugoslav republics, particularly Croatia and Bosnia-Herzegovina, remain burdened by the legacy of the breakup of Yugoslavia and subsequent wars, as well as differing historical interpretations of those events. Bilateral ties with Croatia are frequently strained by unresolved legacy issues from the war in Croatia. Relations with Bosnia and Herzegovina are complex and centre around questions of Bosnia and Herzegovina's internal sovereignty, owing to Serbia's close ties with Republika Srpska, the Serb-majority entity within Bosnia and Herzegovina with which Serbia maintains institutionalized special relations. Relations with Montenegro are complicated by the status of the Serbian language, which, despite being the mother tongue of a relative majority of the population, is not recognized as an official language.

=== Military ===
The Serbian Armed Forces are the military of Serbia and are composed of the Army and the Air Force. The Army consists of four mixed (mechanized infantry and armored) brigades, an artillery brigade and River Flotilla, which patrols the Danube, Sava and Tisza rivers; the Air Force consists of two air brigades, an air defence brigade, and an air surveillance brigade. In addition, there are units attached to the General Staff, including two special forces brigades, a signal brigade, and a logistics brigade.

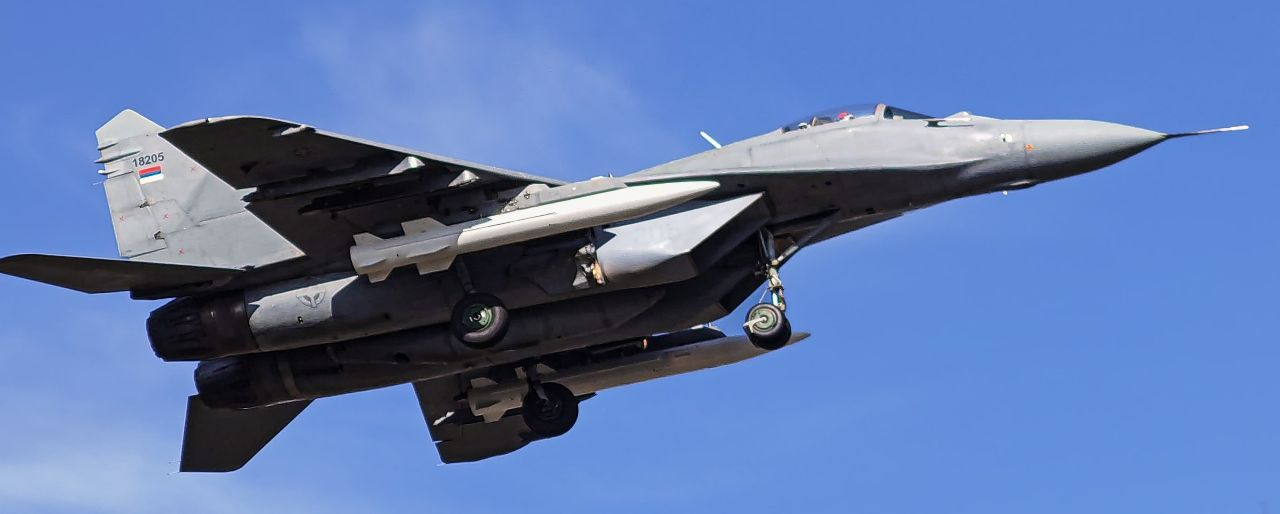
MiG-29 of Serbian Air Force carrying CM-400 supersonic ballistic missiles

The armed forces consist of about 22,500 active military personnel: 13,200 in the Army, 3,000 in the Air Force, and 6,300 in units attached to the General Staff. They are supplemented by the "active" reserve, with about 2,000 members who are generally required to perform 45 days of military service per year, and the "passive" reserve, which totals about 600,000 citizens with past military training and is activated only in the event of war. Conscription with six months of mandatory military service was abolished in 2011 when Serbia switched to all-volunteer professional armed forces.

The 2026 defence budget amounted to $2.7 billion, equivalent to 2.5% of the country's GDP. That same year, the Serbian Armed Forces ranked 63rd out of 145 militaries assessed in the annual Global Firepower Military Strength Ranking.

The President serves as commander-in-chief and appoints the Chief of the General Staff, who exercises operational command over the armed forces through the General Staff. The Government, through the Minister of Defence, is responsible for defence policy and spending, ensuring civil control of the military.

Within its self-declared status of permanent military neutrality, Serbia has no intention of joining a military alliance, including NATO, of which most neighbouring countries are members, due to strong popular opposition, largely a legacy of the NATO bombing of Yugoslavia in 1999. It has a tradition of taking part in UN peacekeeping missions, with past and present deployments including Lebanon, Cyprus, Ivory Coast and Liberia.

== Economy ==
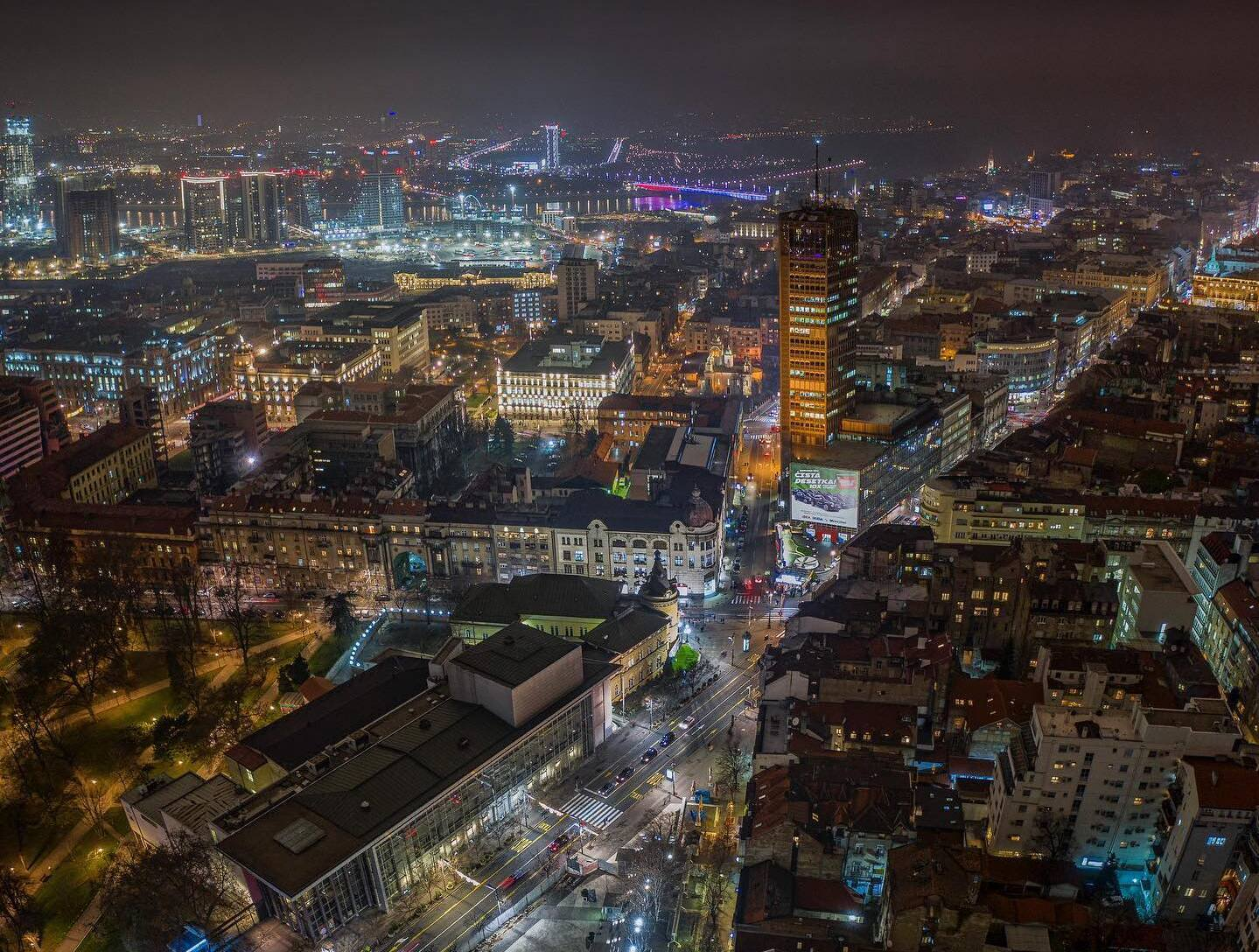
Belgrade, the economic and financial centre of Serbia

Serbia is an upper-middle-income developing mixed economy. It is predominantly a service economy, with the tertiary sector accounting for 58.8% of GDP, followed by the secondary sector with 26.1% and the primary sector with 3.2%. The country has a very high level of human development and moderate levels of income inequality. The official currency is the Serbian dinar, and the central bank is the National Bank of Serbia.

The labour force stands at 3.1 million. The employment rate was 50.9% in 2025; the employment structure shows the characteristics of post-industrial economies, with 60.1% employed in tertiary sector, 28.6% in secondary sector and 11.3% in the primary sector. Unemployment remains a problem, with a rate of 7.2% as of 2026. The average monthly net salary in March 2026 stood at 121,805 dinars ($1,185), while the minimum wage for 2027 is set at 70,450 dinars ($690).

Serbia has an unfavourable balance of trade: imports exceed exports by 26.6%. Exports of goods have nevertheless grown steadily, reaching $37.3 billion in 2025. The country is a member of the CEFTA, a free-trade area covering the Western Balkans and Moldova. It has a preferential trade regime with the European Union and EFTA, and individual free trade agreements with China, Russia, Turkey, Kazakhstan, and Belarus.

Economic development across Serbia varies significantly, with Belgrade, a beta- global city, acting as the country's primary economic hub. Its metropolitan area accounts for 41.7% of the national income, with a gross metropolitan product of $46.8 billion in 2024, making the Belgrade region one of the largest regional economies in the Balkans.

=== Industry ===
The manufacturing and mining sectors account for 12.7% and 3% of GDP, respectively. The country's industrial sector has a strong presence of foreign-owned companies, including numerous major multinational corporations.

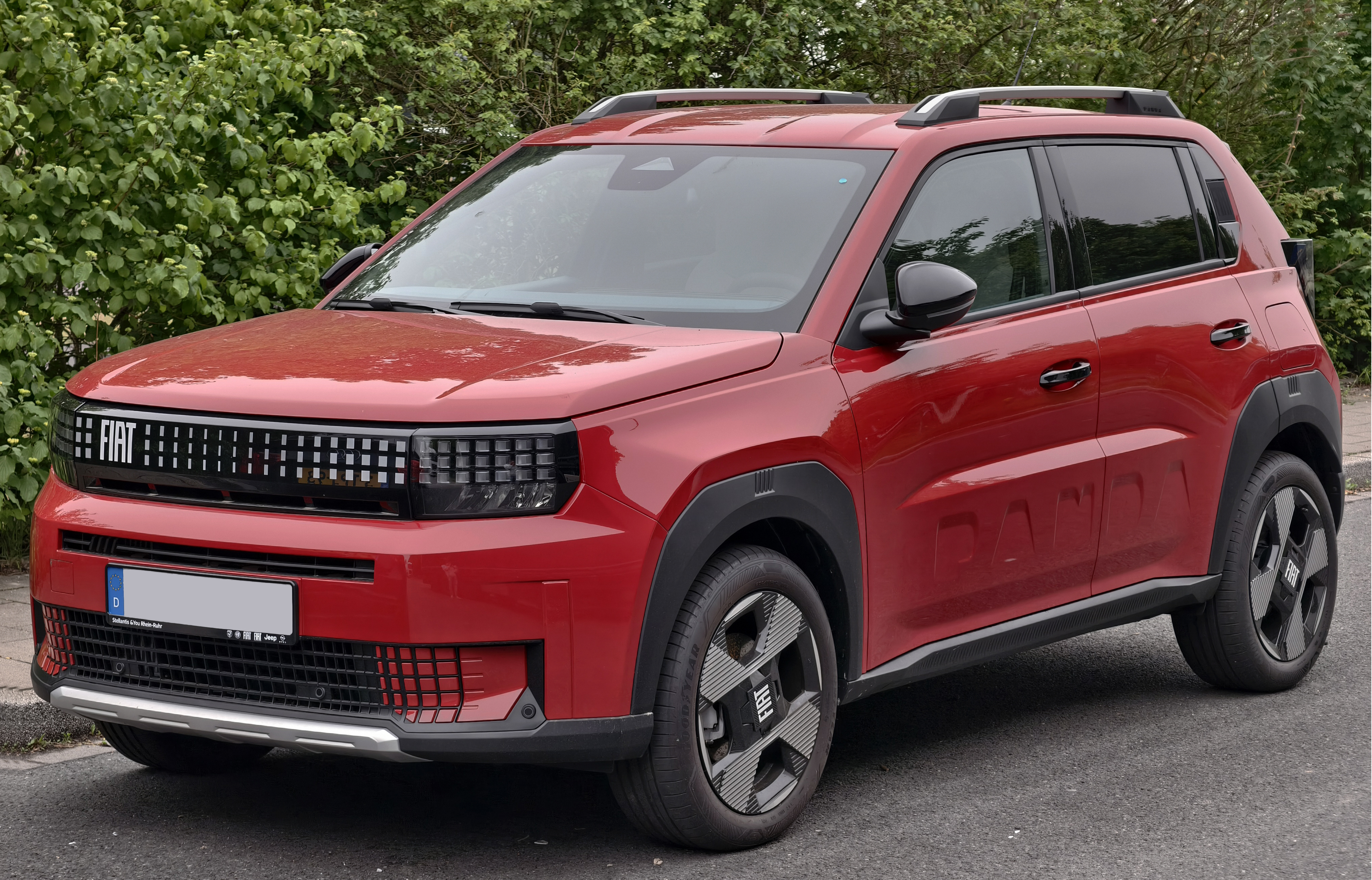
Fiat Grande Panda manufactured at the Stellantis plant in Kragujevac

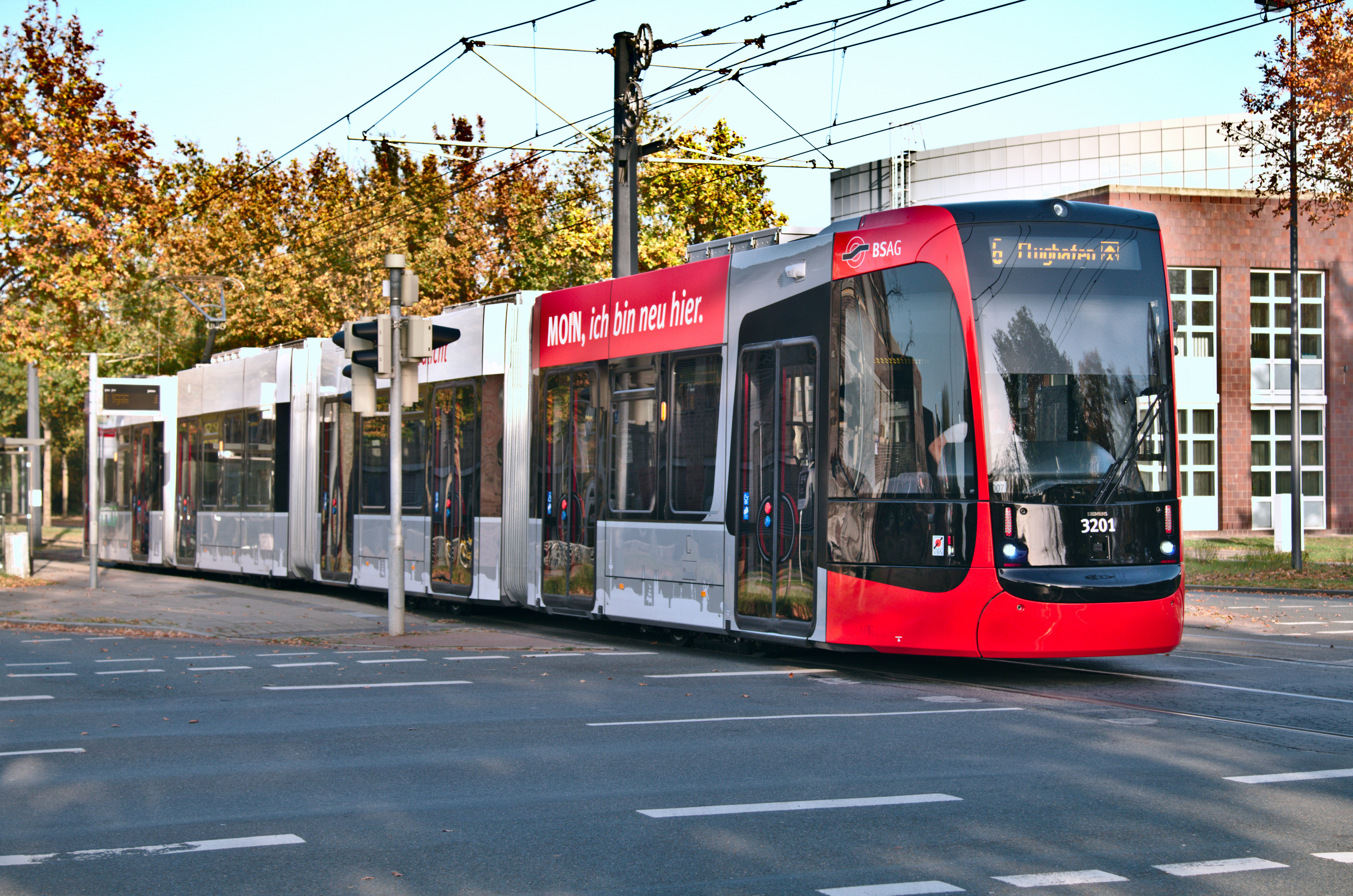
Avenio tram manufactured at the Siemens Mobility plant in Kragujevac

The automotive industry is anchored by the Stellantis automobile assembly plant in Kragujevac, which produces the Fiat Grande Panda and Citroën C3. The country is also home to dozens of manufacturers of automotive components, including ZF (electric drives, power electronics and switches), Aumovio (digital instrument clusters and infotainment screens), Bosch (windscreen wiper systems), Continental (cooling and heating hoses), Nidec (brushless DC motors and electric power steering motors) and Yazaki (electrical wiring), as well as major global tyre manufacturers such as Michelin, Toyo Tires and Linglong.

Serbia's mining sector is comparatively strong: the country is the 16th-largest producer of coal (third in Europe) and the 23rd-largest producer of copper (third in Europe). Its proven reserves of coal lignite are the fifth-largest in the world (second in Europe). Coal is extracted by the national utility company EPS from two large deposits, Kolubara and Kostolac. Copper is extracted, refined and smelted at the Bor mining complex by the Chinese company Zijin Mining. Significant gold extraction is carried out around Majdanpek. The Jadar Basin in western Serbia contains one of Europe's largest lithium deposits, with mining rights held by Rio Tinto; however, exploitation has not begun amid large protests over its potential environmental impact, and the future of the proposed mine remains uncertain.

Serbia is a leading steel producer in Southeast Europe, with 1.4 million tonnes of crude steel produced in 2025, all at the Hesteel steel mill in Smederevo.

The arms industry is well-developed, with Serbia ranked 25th worldwide in arms exports, surpassing $1.6 billion in 2023. The sector is dominated by domestic companies such as Yugoimport–SDPR (self-propelled howitzers, infantry fighting vehicles and armored vehicles), Sloboda (artillery ammunition), Krušik (large-caliber ammunition), Milan Blagojević (gunpowder), Zastava Arms (firearms), and Prvi Partizan (small-caliber ammunition), as well as SDS Technologies (short-range combat drones), a joint venture between Israeli Elbit Systems and Yugoimport–SDPR.

Some global brand names in the food and beverage sectors have established production in Serbia. Nestlé manufactures plant-based meat products, PepsiCo snack foods, and Dr. Oetker powdered food products, while Barry Callebaut processes cocoa and manufactures chocolate. Coca-Cola HBC is the anchor bottler of Coca-Cola for the region. Serbia ranked 43rd globally in beer production in 2023, with three major multinational corporations, Heineken, Carlsberg and Molson Coors, operating breweries in the country. Major global tobacco producers Philip Morris, British American Tobacco and Japan Tobacco have factories in Serbia.

The chemical industry has a diverse industrial footprint. Petrohemija is the country's only petrochemical complex, producing polymers alongside basic feedstocks such as ethylene and propylene. Henkel is a major producer of household chemicals, manufacturing laundry detergents. Messer and Linde are major suppliers of industrial gases. Mineral fertilizers are produced by the domestic company Elixir. Hemofarm, owned by German Stada, is one of the largest pharmaceutical manufacturers in the region, producing almost 8 billion units of both prescription and over-the-counter medicines per year.

The machine industry covers a range of products. Siemens Mobility manufactures Avenio trams, while Grundfos produces pumps. Flender (de) manufactures generators for wind turbines, while Bizerba produces retail scales and Hansgrohe manufactures faucets. Hisense produces refrigerators and freezers.

The building materials industry is centred on cement, roofing materials, and floor coverings. Holcim, CRH and Titan are major cement producers, while Wienerberger manufactures roof tiles and Tarkett produces a broad range of floor coverings.

Serbia's packaging industry brings together major international manufacturers across several segments. Ball produces more than 1.5 billion aluminium beverage cans annually, while Vaider Group manufactures glass bottles for beverages. DS Smith and Smurfit Westrock manufacture corrugated cardboard shipping and retail containers, while Tetra Pak produces aseptic cartons for liquid food.

=== Science and technology ===
In 2024, Serbia's expenditure on research and development (R&D) amounted to 1% of GDP, below the European average of over 2%. Serbia was ranked 54th in the Global Innovation Index in 2025.

The information and communications technology sector contributes roughly 8.5% of GDP and has grown into the country's largest export category, with ICT services exports reaching $5.3 billion in 2025.

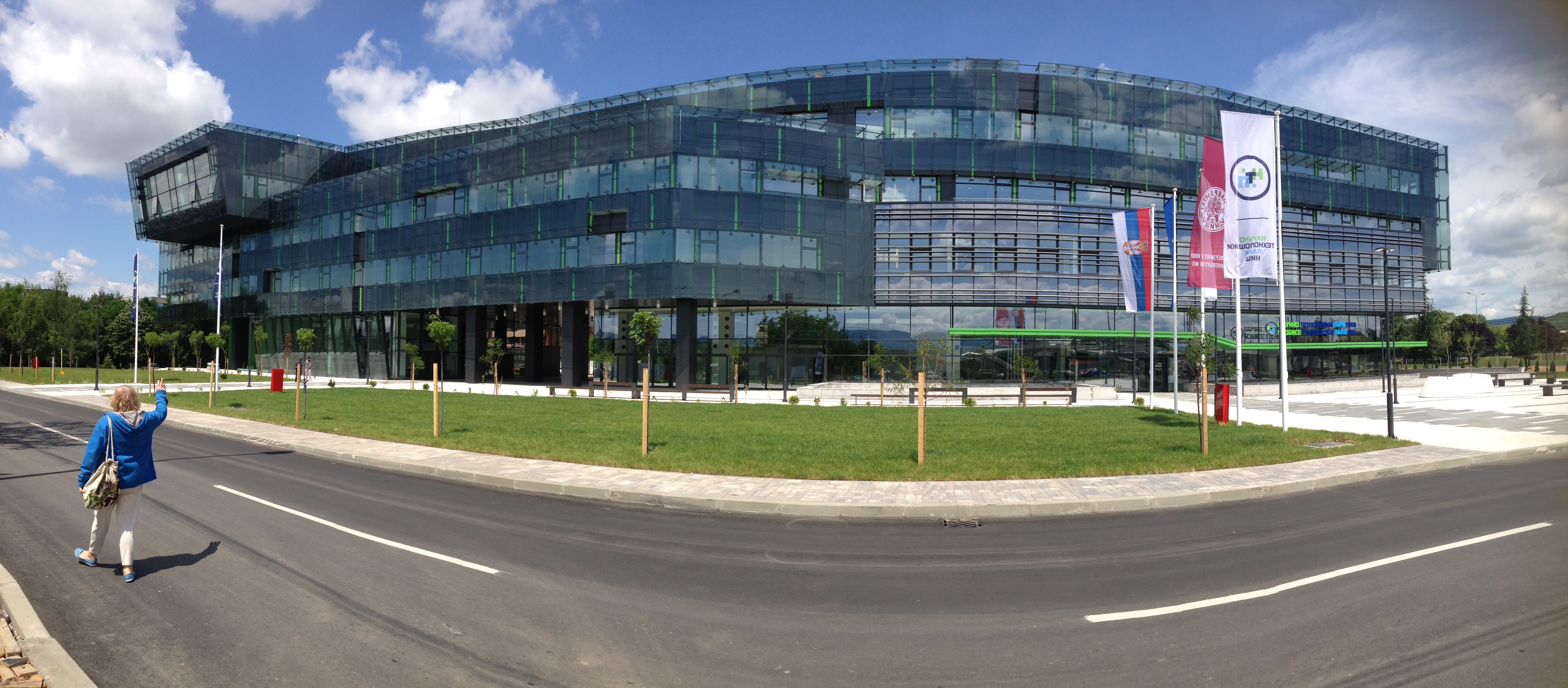
Science Technology Park in Niš, one of six such centres in Serbia supporting technology startups

Serbia has begun to develop hyperscale computing infrastructure, with one tier IV data center in Kragujevac, which, with a capacity of 14 MW and planned expansion to 54 MW by 2030, is currently the largest supercomputer cluster in Southeastern Europe.

Large investments by global technology companies have contributed significantly to the growth of Serbia's technology sector. Microsoft opened its development centre in Belgrade in 2005, the fifth such centre in the world at the time, which has since become one of the company's largest software engineering centres in Europe. Schneider Electric and Aumovio also operate global development and software engineering centres in the country, specializing respectively in energy management and electrical systems and in digital display solutions for automobiles. Oracle, Cisco, and NCR Voyix have also established outsourcing and service centres in Serbia.

Serbia also has a sizeable video game industry, headed by Nordeus, a subsidiary of Take-Two Interactive and the developer of Top Eleven Football Manager, one of the most widely played mobile sports games, with over 300 million registered users worldwide, as well as Trilateral Studio, owned by Epic Games, which specializes in creating realistic 3D characters and facial animations for video games.

Over the last decade, a growing number of domestic startups have obtained funding from international investors. Ominimo, an AI-driven car insurance startup, became Serbia's first unicorn in 2026, when a funding round valued it at $1.6 billion.

=== Agriculture ===
Serbia has very favourable natural conditions, including its land and climate, for diverse agricultural production. It has 3,373,034 hectares of utilized agricultural land, of which 3,294,000 hectares is arable land (0.5 hectares per capita). Agriculture accounts for 3.2% of the country's GDP. In 2024, exports of agricultural and food products stood at $5.8 billion, with an export-import ratio of 178%.

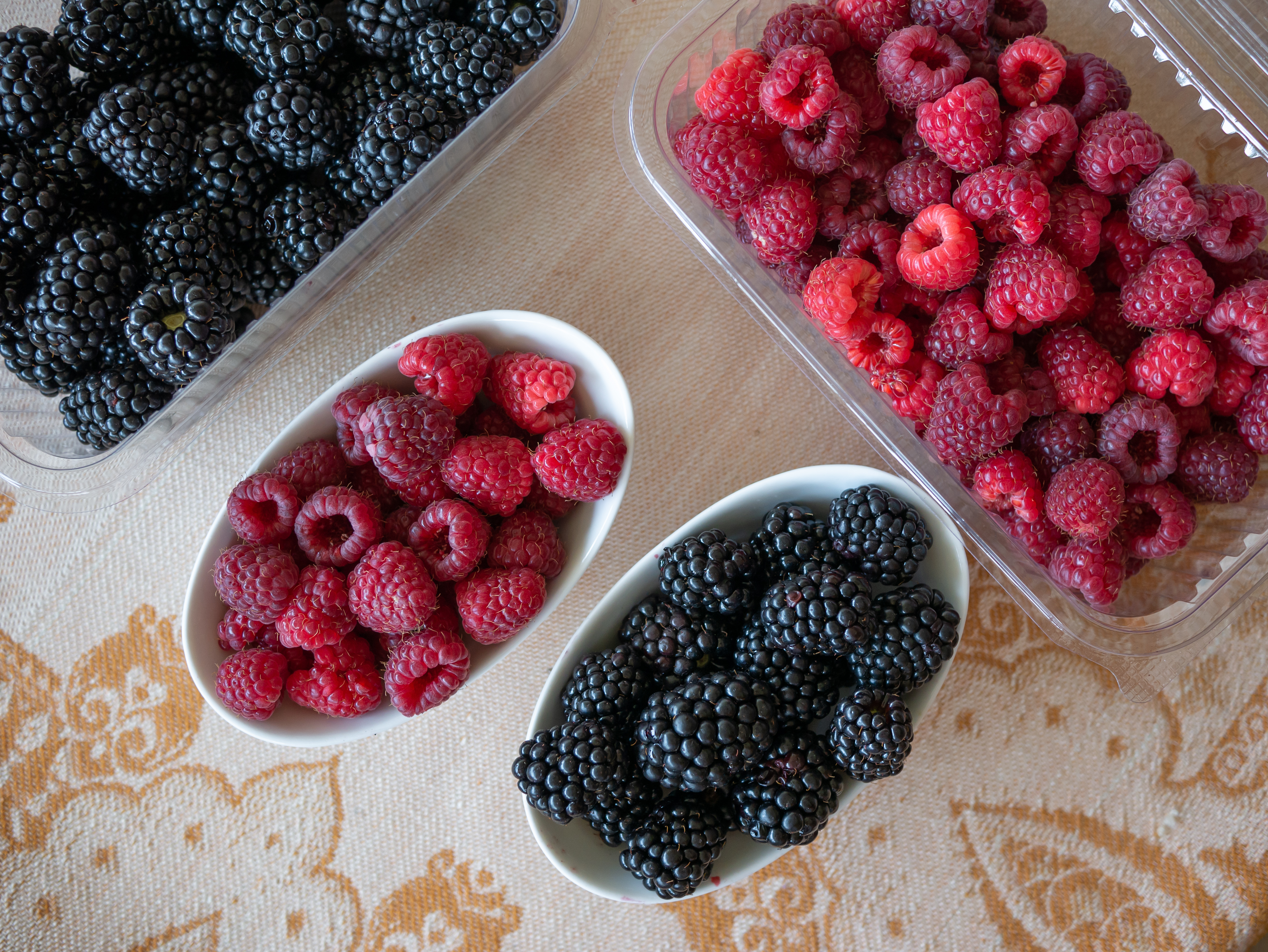
Serbia is one of the largest producers of raspberries and blackberries

Large-scale and more industrialized agricultural production is concentrated in the northern part of the country, in the regions of Bačka, Banat, Syrmia and Mačva, which account for the bulk of the country's agricultural output. Agriculture in these areas is characterized by larger farms and extensive cultivation of cereals, oilseeds and other field crops. The rest of the country relies predominantly on smaller-scale farming, with production focused more on fruits and vegetables.

The country is a significant producer of cereals, particularly maize (6,630,984 tonnes in 2023, ranked 22nd globally) and wheat (3,448,700 tonnes, 33rd globally), root crops such as sugar beet (2,040,624 tonnes, 21st globally), as well as oilseeds such as sunflower (686,628 tonnes, 16th globally) and soybean (599,878 tonnes, 16th globally).

Serbia has significant fruit production: in 2023, it was the world's third-largest producer of raspberries (98,674 tonnes), the fourth-largest producer of plums (362,713 tonnes), and the fifth-largest producer of sour cherries (144,849 tonnes). It also has sizeable production of cherries (15,575 tonnes, 28th worldwide), apples (486,215 tonnes, 29th globally), pears (59,711 tonnes, 29th globally), watermelons (60,959 tonnes, 46th worldwide), and grapes (131,525 tonnes, 47th globally). The most widely produced vegetable is the potato (599,574 tonnes, 53rd globally). The country also produces significant quantities of sunflower oil (204,308 tonnes, 16th globally) and soybean oil (64,270 tonnes, 38th globally).

It has a long tradition of winemaking, with several autochthonous grape varieties still cultivated today. There are 17,437 hectares of vineyards in Serbia, with wine production reaching 23,370 tonnes in 2023, ranking 38th worldwide.

=== Tourism ===
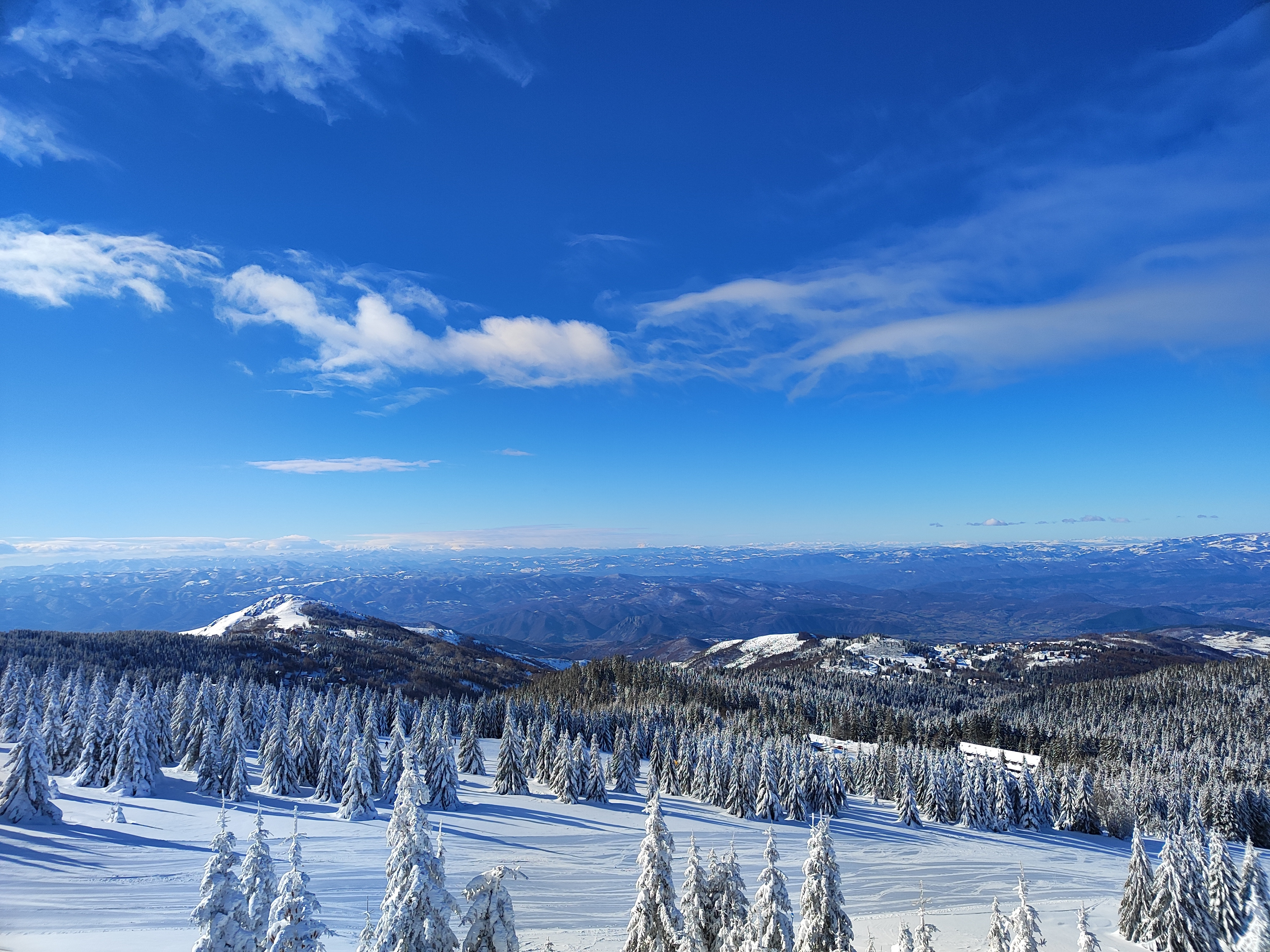
Kopaonik ski resort

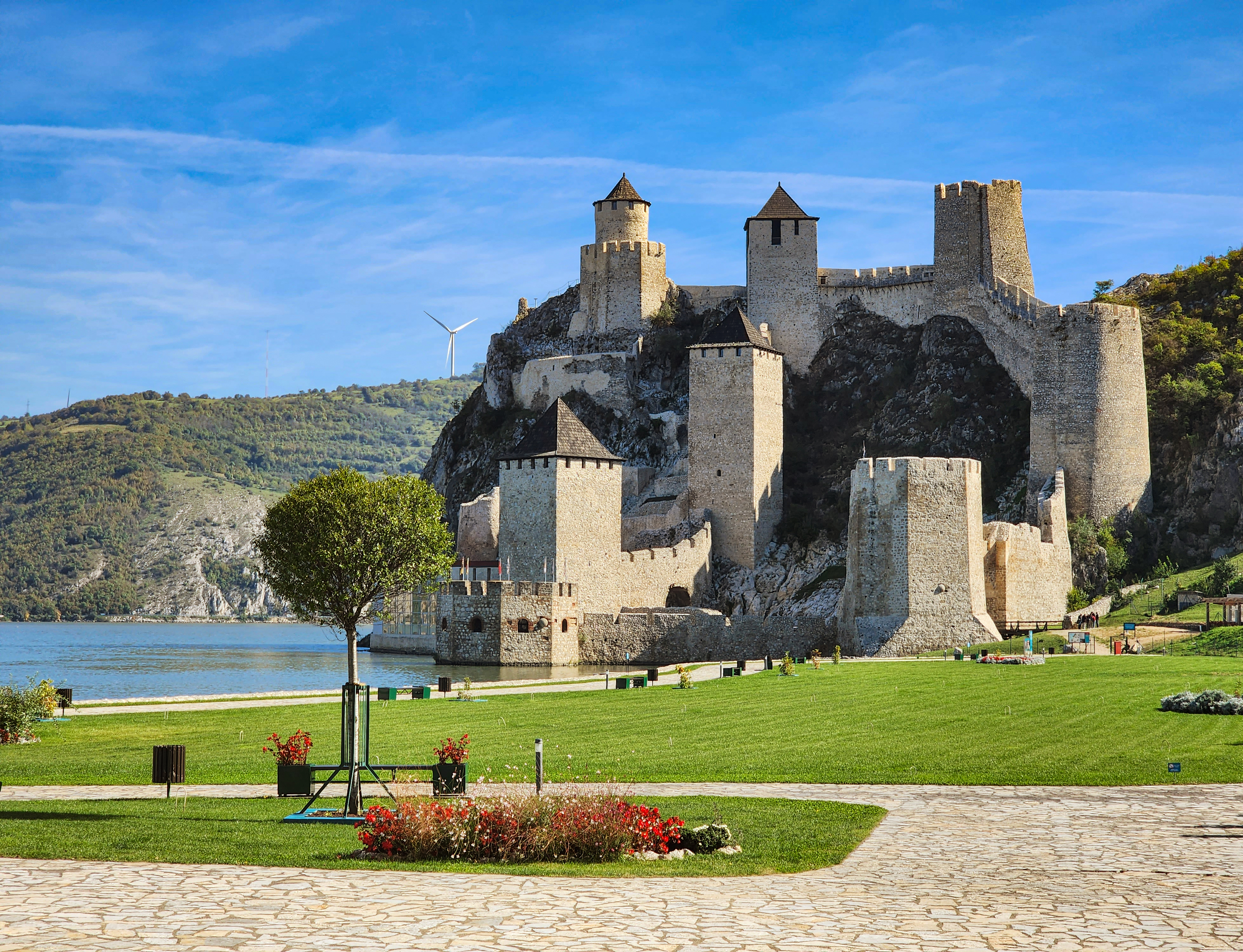
Golubac Fortress

Serbia is not a mass-tourism destination, with tourism accounting for 3% of the country's GDP. In 2024, 4.4 million tourist arrivals were recorded at accommodations, of which 2.3 million were foreign visitors. Foreign exchange earnings from tourism were estimated at about $3 billion. Tourism is mainly focused on the country's mountain and spa resorts, which are predominantly visited by domestic tourists, while Belgrade is the preferred destination for foreign visitors, accounting for almost two-thirds of all foreign tourist arrivals.

Mountain tourism is centred on resorts such as Kopaonik, Zlatibor and Stara Planina, which offer skiing and other winter sports, as well as hiking and nature-based activities during the warmer months. Spa tourism is well developed, with spa resort towns such as Vrnjačka Banja, Palić and Banja Koviljača combining thermal and mineral waters with wellness and health-related services.

City-break tourism is concentrated primarily in Belgrade, which offers a combination of cultural attractions, gastronomy and nightlife, while also serving as a destination for conference and business tourism.

River cruising is a growing tourism product, with the Danube forming one of Europe's major river-cruise routes. Itineraries connecting Serbia with cities such as Budapest and Vienna typically stop in Belgrade and Novi Sad, as well as at historic fortifications such as Golubac and Ram along the riverbanks.

Festival tourism has developed as a distinct niche, with major music and food festivals attracting visitors from Serbia and abroad. Several internationally renowned music festivals are held in Serbia, including Exit and the Guča Trumpet Festival, alongside numerous food festivals, most notably the Leskovac Grill Festival.

Heritage tourism is another tourism product, centred on the country's Orthodox monasteries, Roman archaeological sites, and numerous medieval fortresses.

=== Energy ===
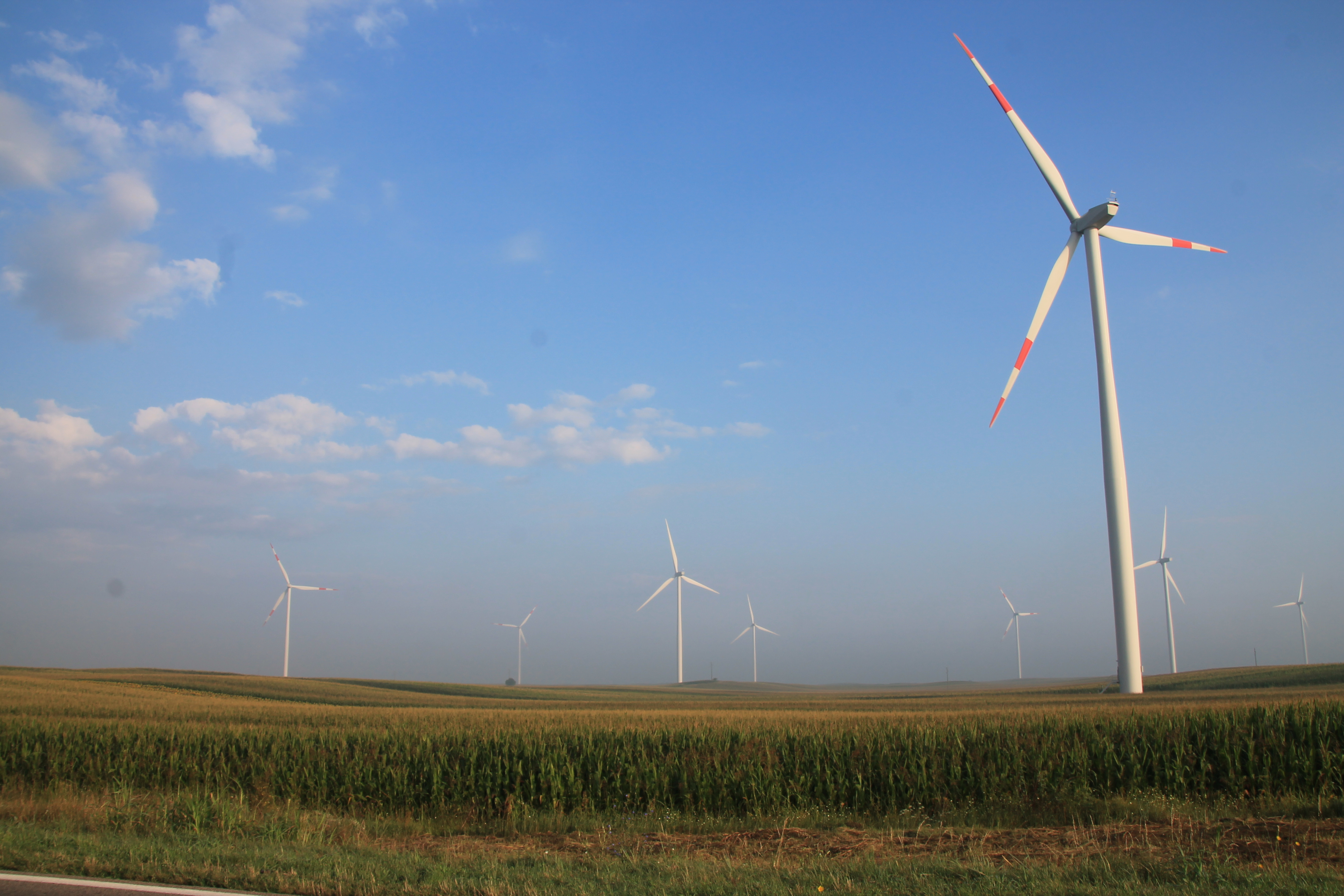
Wind farm near Alibunar

Serbia is a net exporter of electrical energy: in 2025, electricity production reached 34.3 TWh, compared with final consumption of 31.5 TWh. Some 69% of electricity generation comes from fossil fuels, while 31% comes from renewable sources. In 2025, total installed capacity stood at 8,868 MW, comprising six coal-fired thermal power stations with a combined capacity of 4,153 MW, fourteen hydroelectric power stations with 2,948 MW, nine wind farms with 828 MW, four natural gas- and mazut-fired thermal power stations with 552 MW, and photovoltaic power stations with a combined capacity of 195 MW. Over 90% of electricity production is concentrated in EPS, the national electric utility.

The country is heavily dependent on foreign sources for oil and natural gas. Domestic oil and gas production meets only 20% and 10% of the country's needs, respectively. In 2025, the national oil company, NIS, produced 0.77 million tonnes of oil as well as around 300 million cubic metres of natural gas. The company operates the country's sole oil refinery in Pančevo, with a capacity of 4.8 million tonnes per year. A branch of the Adria pipeline connects the Pančevo oil refinery to oil terminals on the Adriatic Sea. A separate Serbia–Hungary oil pipeline, to be connected to the Druzhba pipeline, is designed to provide an alternative route and is scheduled to become operational in 2027. The Balkan Stream, a natural gas pipeline with a capacity of 13.9 billion cubic metres annually, runs through Serbia and carries most of the country's imported natural gas. There is an underground natural gas storage facility at Banatski Dvor, with a capacity of 750 million cubic metres, equivalent to approximately one-quarter of the country's annual consumption. The natural gas system comprises 3,217 km of trunk pipelines and 25,707 km of distribution pipelines. Around 13% of households are directly heated by natural gas, while a further 22% are supplied with district heating generated by gas-fired heating plants.

=== Transport ===
The Serbian road network carries the bulk of traffic in the country. The total length of paved roads is 31,463 km (19,550 mi), consisting of 13,638 km (8,474 mi) of national road network ("state roads") and 17,825 km (11,076 mi) of local roads ("municipal roads"). There are 1,092 km (679 mi) of motorways and 222 km (138 mi) of expressways. As of 2025, there were 2,573,843 registered passenger cars or 392 per 1,000 persons. Coach transport is extensive, with almost every part of the country connected by bus services, from major cities to villages. More than a hundred coach services operate both domestic and international routes, mainly to Western European countries with large Serb diaspora communities.

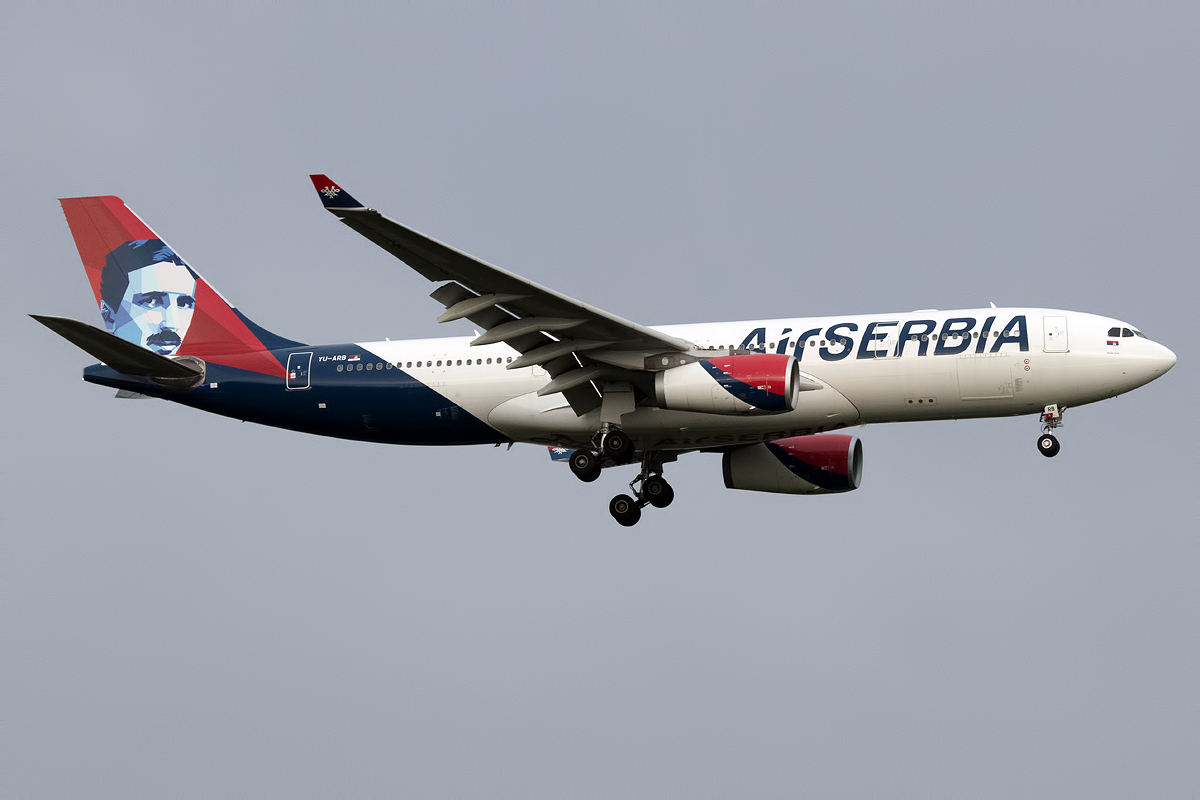
Air Serbia wide-body aircraft featuring Nikola Tesla on its tail

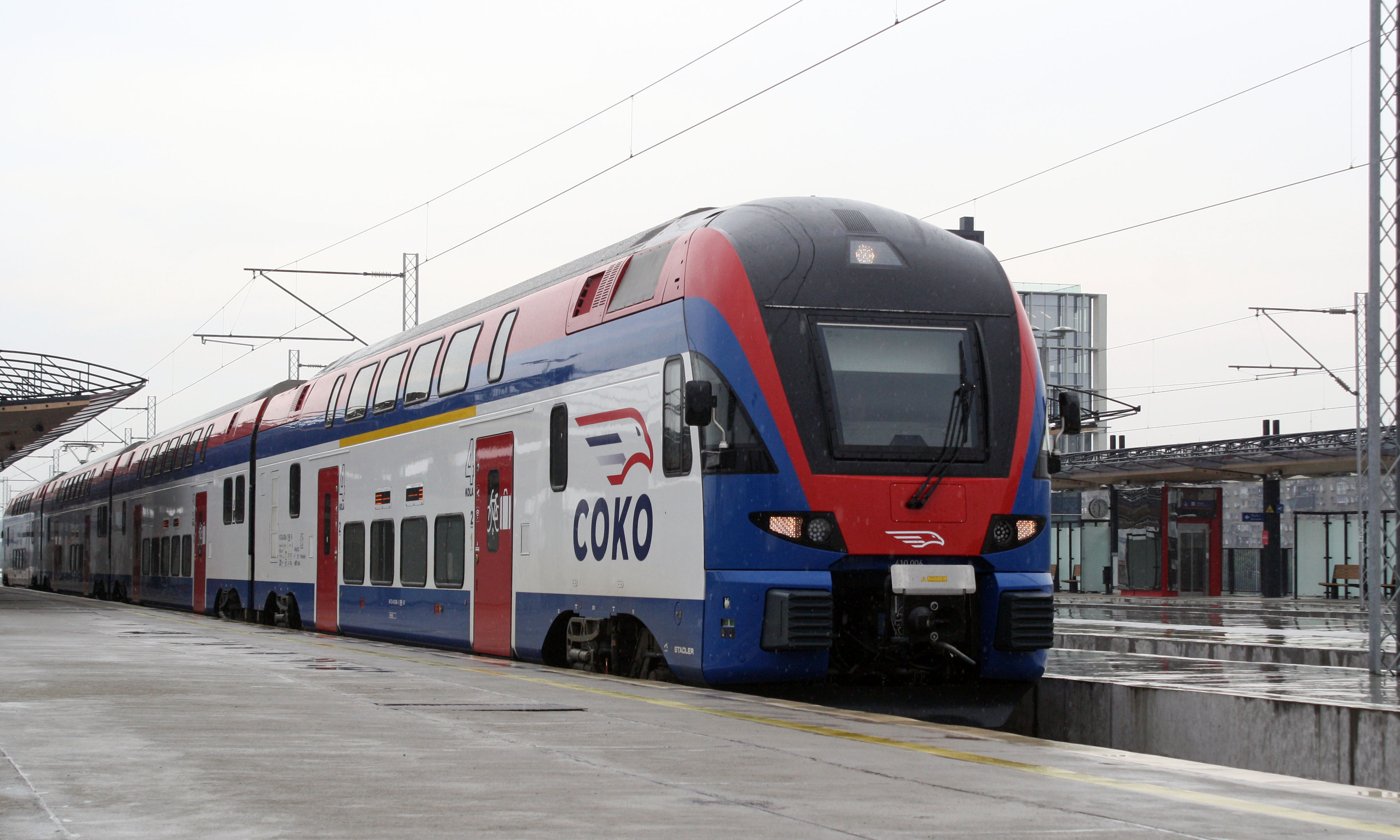
Srbijavoz Soko high-speed train

Serbia has 3,357 km (2,086 mi) of railway tracks, of which 1,313 km (816 mi) are electrified and 349 km (217 mi) are double-track. There are currently 183 km (114 mi) of high-speed rail connecting three of the country's five largest cities: Belgrade, Novi Sad and Subotica. Construction of a 212 km (132 mi) extension of the high-speed railway to the southern city of Niš is set to begin in 2027. Passenger rail services are operated by Srbijavoz, which carried around 7.7 million passengers on intercity routes in 2025.

A total of 9.3 million passengers passed through the country's three international airports in 2025, with Belgrade Nikola Tesla Airport serving the vast majority of them. The airport offers connections to 118 destinations across more than 40 countries, eight of which are intercontinental routes to North America, the Far East and the Middle East. It is the hub of the national flag carrier Air Serbia, which operates flights to 90 destinations in 34 countries and carried 4.5 million passengers in 2025.

Serbia has well-developed inland water transport, with 1,716 km (1,066 mi) of navigable inland waterways, of which 963 km (598 mi) are rivers and 673 km (418 mi) canals, all located in the northern third of the country. The most important inland waterway is the Danube, which connects the country with the North Sea and Atlantic Ocean through the Rhine–Main–Danube Canal as well as to the Black Sea through the Danube–Black Sea Canal. Other navigable rivers include Sava and Tisza. Serbian river ports handled 15 million tonnes of cargo in 2024, the largest of which are: Novi Sad, Pančevo, Smederevo, and Prahovo.

A total of 37.3 million tonnes of freight was transported in 2025, of which 22.7 million tonnes by road, 9.3 million tonnes by rail, 5.3 million tonnes by inland waterways, and 6,233 tonnes by air.

== Demographics ==
According to the 2022 census, Serbia (excluding Kosovo) had a total population of 6,647,003, ranking 107th in the world. It has a moderate population density of 85.7 inhabitants per square kilometre.

Serbia completed its demographic transition by the 1970s and since the 1990s has experienced a demographic crisis characterized by below-replacement fertility, negative natural increase, population ageing, and net emigration. In 2025, the crude birth rate was 9.1 per 1,000 inhabitants, while the crude death rate was 14.9 per 1,000, among the highest in the world. Although the total fertility rate of 1.6 children per woman is one of the highest in Europe, it remains well below the replacement level of 2.1. Serbia has a comparatively old population, with a median age of 44.0 years and 22.6% of inhabitants aged 65 or older. About 30% of all households consist of a single person, while only 20% consist of four or more people. Over the past decade, Serbia has recorded an average annual net migration loss of approximately 12,000 people.

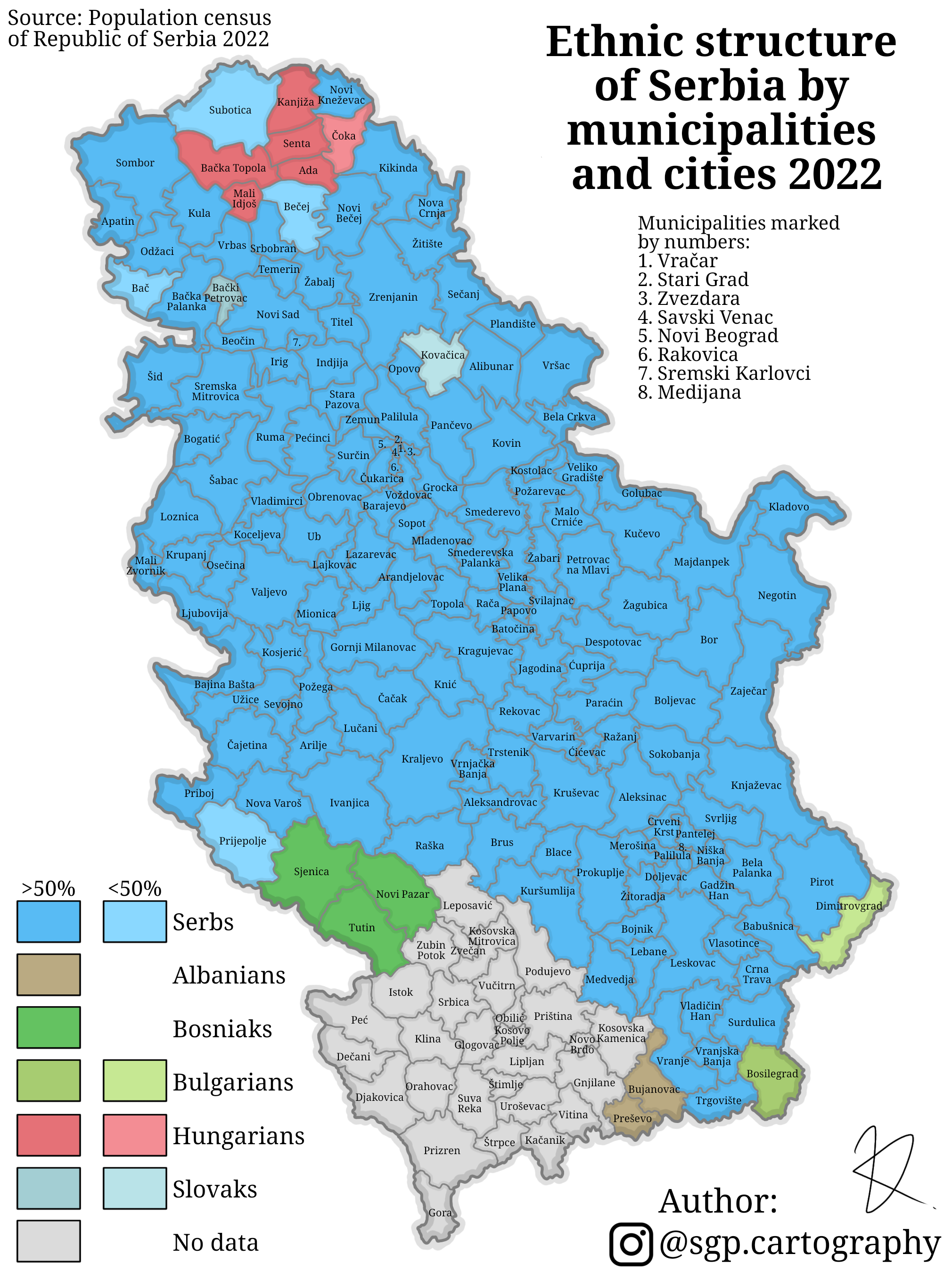
Ethnic map of Serbia (Note: Including Kosovo)

The country is home to many ethnic groups. The Serbs are the largest ethnic group, numbering 5,360,239 people and accounting for 80.6% of the population. They are the titular ethnic group of Serbia, which is constitutionally recognized as their nation-state. Despite a decline in recent decades, Hungarians remain the largest ethnic minority, with a population of 184,442, accounting for 2.8% of the country's population and concentrated predominantly in northern Bačka. Bosniaks, numbering 153,801 and representing 2.3% of the population, are the second-largest ethnic minority, mainly inhabiting the Sandžak region in the southwest of the country. The Roma population stood at 131,936, constituting 2% of the total population. All other ethnic groups individually account for less than 1% of the population, including Albanians (0.9%); Slovaks and Croats (0.6% each); Yugoslavs (0.4%); Romanians, Vlachs, and Montenegrins (0.3% each); Macedonians and Bulgarians (0.2% each); and Rusyns and Bunjevci (0.1% each).

Compared to other Eastern European countries, Serbia saw relatively low levels of emigration until the latter half of the 20th century. The country saw mass labour emigration in the late 1960s and throughout the 1970s and 1980s, during which hundreds of thousands emigrated as "guest workers" to Western Europe, driven by unemployment and bilateral labour agreements between Yugoslavia and the respective destination countries. This was followed in the 1990s by another wave of mass emigration, caused by political instability resulting from the breakup of Yugoslavia as well as by the economic collapse caused by international sanctions against Serbia. According to recent estimates, around 800,000 Serbian citizens and Serbia-born persons live abroad, predominantly in Europe and, to a much lesser extent, overseas, primarily in North America and Oceania.

Parallel to the process of emigration, the country experienced immigration, primarily involving ethnic Serbs from neighbouring regions and countries. Throughout the 19th century, Serbia experienced substantial immigration of ethnic Serbs from areas under Ottoman and Habsburg rule, contributing significantly to population growth. During and after World War II, tens of thousands of Serb refugees from the Independent State of Croatia arrived in Serbia, while more than 200,000 predominantly Serb settlers from Croatia and Bosnia-Herzegovina were resettled in Vojvodina under a postwar colonization programme; migration of ethnic Serbs from other Yugoslav republics to Serbia continued throughout the era of socialist Yugoslavia. In the 1990s, the dissolution of Yugoslavia and ensuing wars led to a massive influx of ethnic Serb refugees from Croatia, Bosnia-Herzegovina, and Kosovo, with around half a million people arriving in Serbia and making it host to Europe's largest refugee population at the time. In recent years, the country has seen a significant wave of immigration from Russia following the Russian invasion of Ukraine in 2022. Some 53,000 Russian nationals have settled in the country after being issued residence permits. Additionally, 12,000 Chinese people live in the country, mainly linked to economic activities and investments by Chinese companies in mining and manufacturing. There has also been a sizeable influx of South Asian migrants, primarily Indians, who have arrived as labour migrants working on large-scale infrastructure projects and in transportation and courier services.

The share of the population living in areas classified as urban stood at 62% in 2024. Belgrade is the only city with more than one million inhabitants and is disproportionately larger than any other city in the country, serving as an example of a primate city; it is four times as populous as the second-largest city, Novi Sad. Consequently, Serbia has a comparatively high level of metropolization, with almost one-fifth of the country's population living in the Belgrade urban area alone.

Largest cities or towns in Serbia Statistical Office of Serbia – 2022 Census
Rank	Name	District	Pop.	Rank	Name	District	Pop.
1	Belgrade	City of Belgrade	1,298,661 (Note: Population of the contiguous urban area of Belgrade (including adjacent settlements of Borča, Kaluđerica, and Surčin). Population of Belgrade proper stood at 1,197,714.)	11	Kraljevo	Raška	57,432
2	Novi Sad	South Bačka	325,511 (Note: Population of the contiguous urban area of Novi Sad (including adjacent settlements of Petrovaradin, Sremska Kamenica, Veternik, and Futog). Population of Novi Sad proper stood at 260,438.)	12	Valjevo	Kolubara	56,059
3	Niš	Nišava	178,976	13	Leskovac	Jablanica	54,091
4	Kragujevac	Šumadija	146,315	14	Kruševac	Rasina	53,746
5	Subotica	North Bačka	88,752	15	Šabac	Mačva	51,163
6	Pančevo	South Banat	73,401	16	Vranje	Pčinja	50,954
7	Novi Pazar	Raška	71,462	17	Užice	Zlatibor	48,539
8	Čačak	Moravica	69,598	18	Požarevac	Braničevo	42,530
9	Zrenjanin	Central Banat	67,129	19	Sombor	West Bačka	41,814
10	Smederevo	Podunavlje	59,261	20	Sremska Mitrovica	Srem	36,764

=== Language ===
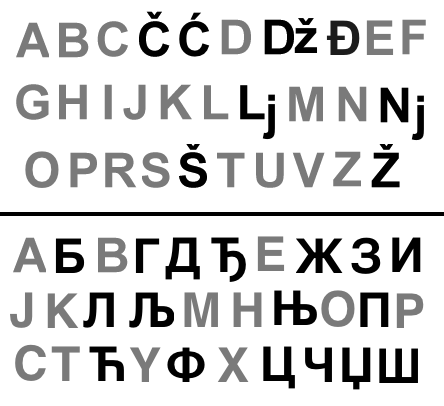
Serbian is a rare example of active digraphia, with both Cyrillic (bottom) and Latin (top) alphabets in regular use

The official language is Serbian, spoken as a mother tongue by 5,607,558 people, or 84.4% of the population, and predominant throughout most of the country. It is the most widely spoken South Slavic language and is mutually intelligible with other standard varieties of Serbo-Croatian. Serbian is one of the few European languages with active digraphia, with both Cyrillic and Latin alphabets in regular use. Serbian Cyrillic was standardized in the early 19th century according to strict phonemic principles, with each sound represented by a single consistent letter. The Latin alphabet used for Serbian is based on Czech orthography and maintains a one-to-one correspondence with Serbian Cyrillic, creating a parallel orthographic system. The Constitution designates Serbian Cyrillic as the official script and mandates its use in legal and administrative domains. However, legislation does not regulate script usage in standard language, leaving the choice of script in everyday life to personal preference, including in publishing, media, trade, and commerce. According to a 2014 poll, 47% of the population uses the Latin alphabet more frequently, 36% primarily uses Cyrillic, while 16% uses both alphabets equally.

There are 14 recognized minority languages in Serbia, mainly spoken by the country's ethnic minorities: Hungarian (native to 2.5% of the population), Bosnian (2.2%), Romani (1.2%), Albanian (1%), Slovak (0.6%), Romanian (0.3%), Vlach (0.3%), Croatian (0.2%), Rusyn (0.1%), Macedonian (0.1%), Bulgarian (0.1%), Montenegrin, Bunjevac, and Czech. Bosnian, Croatian, Montenegrin, and Bunjevac are mutually intelligible with Serbian and share the same linguistic base. Recognized minority languages are granted official use in municipalities and cities where the share of the respective ethnic minority population exceeds 15%. As of 2025, around 6% of students attend classes in recognized minority languages at all levels of education, from preschool to university.

Other languages have no official status and are largely spoken by immigrant communities. Russian is the most widely spoken among these, while there is also a certain presence of Chinese and Arabic.

=== Religion ===
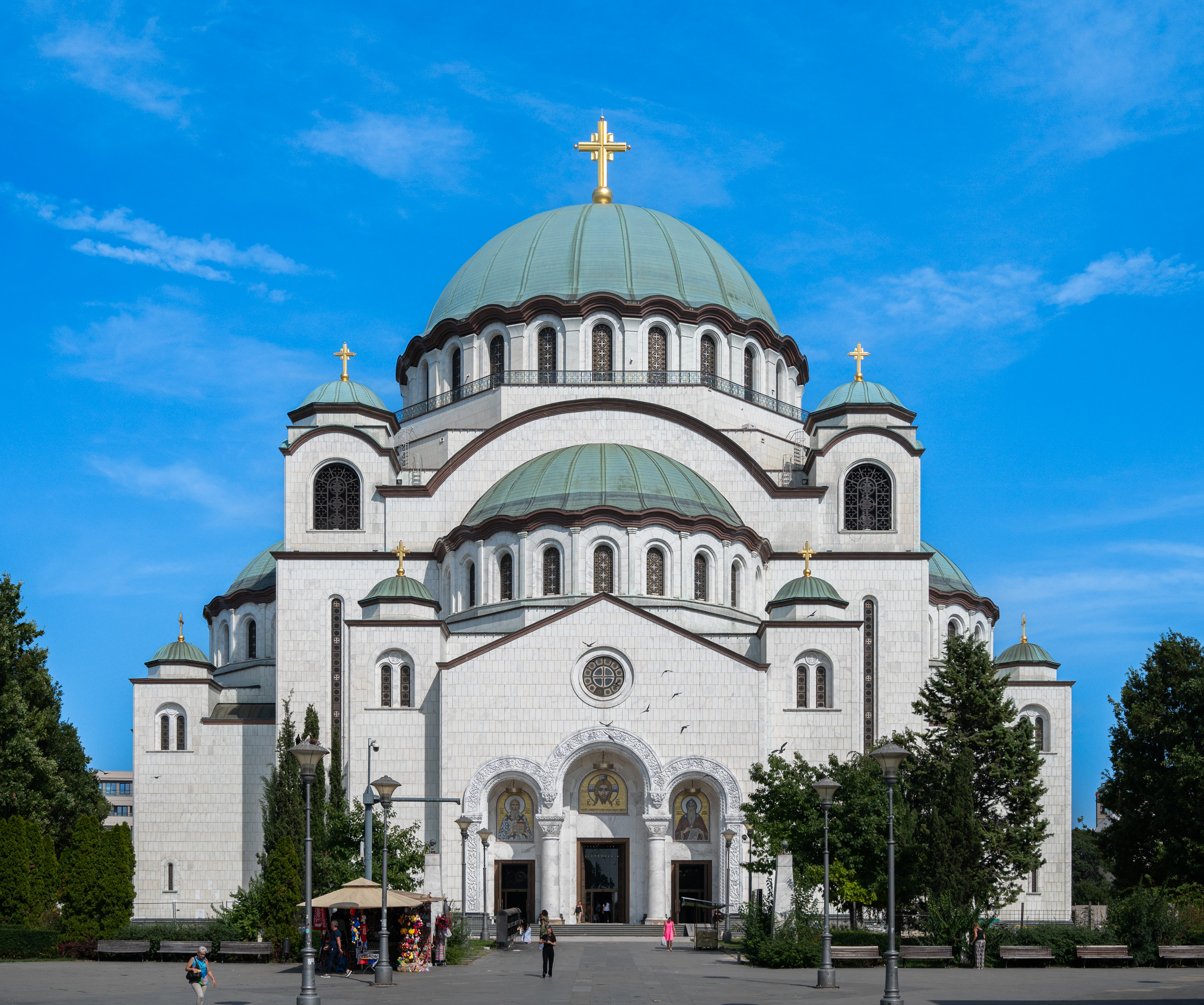
Church of Saint Sava in Belgrade, one of the largest Orthodox churches in the world

Serbia is a secular state with no state religion, and freedom of religion is guaranteed as a constitutional right.

Christianity is the most widely professed religion in Serbia, which has been predominantly Christian since the Christianization of the Serbs in the 9th century.

Eastern Orthodoxy is by far the largest Christian denomination and is prevalent throughout most of the country. According to the 2022 census, there were 5,387,426 adherents of Eastern Orthodoxy, accounting for 81.1% of the total population. They are overwhelmingly ethnic Serbs, who constitute the world's westernmost predominantly Orthodox ethnic group. The Serbian Orthodox Church is the traditional church of the country and is the sole jurisdiction for Orthodox Christians not only in the territory of Serbia but also in Bosnia-Herzegovina, Montenegro, Croatia, and Slovenia, which together constitute its canonical territory.

Catholicism is a minority Christian denomination in Serbia, with 257,269 adherents, representing 3.9% of the population. It is primarily present among ethnic Hungarians and Croats, but also among Rusyns, who are traditionally Greek Catholic.

Protestantism is another minority Christian denomination in Serbia, with 54,678 adherents accounting for 0.8% of the country's population. Historically, Protestants in Serbia have consisted primarily of Magisterial Reformation traditions, particularly Lutheranism and Calvinism. Protestantism is prevalent among ethnic Slovaks, who are predominantly Lutheran and constitute the majority of the country's Protestant population. It is also present among ethnic Hungarians, a minority of whom are Protestant, predominantly belonging to the Reformed (Calvinist) tradition.

Islam is the second-largest religion in Serbia, with nearly all of the country's Muslims belonging to Sunni Islam. There were 278,212 Muslims in the country, accounting for 4.2% of the population. Islam is particularly prevalent among ethnic Bosniaks and Albanians; in addition, approximately one-quarter of the country's Roma population is Muslim.

A comparatively small portion of the population is non-religious or sceptical, with 1.1% identifying as atheist and an additional 0.1% as agnostic.

=== Education ===
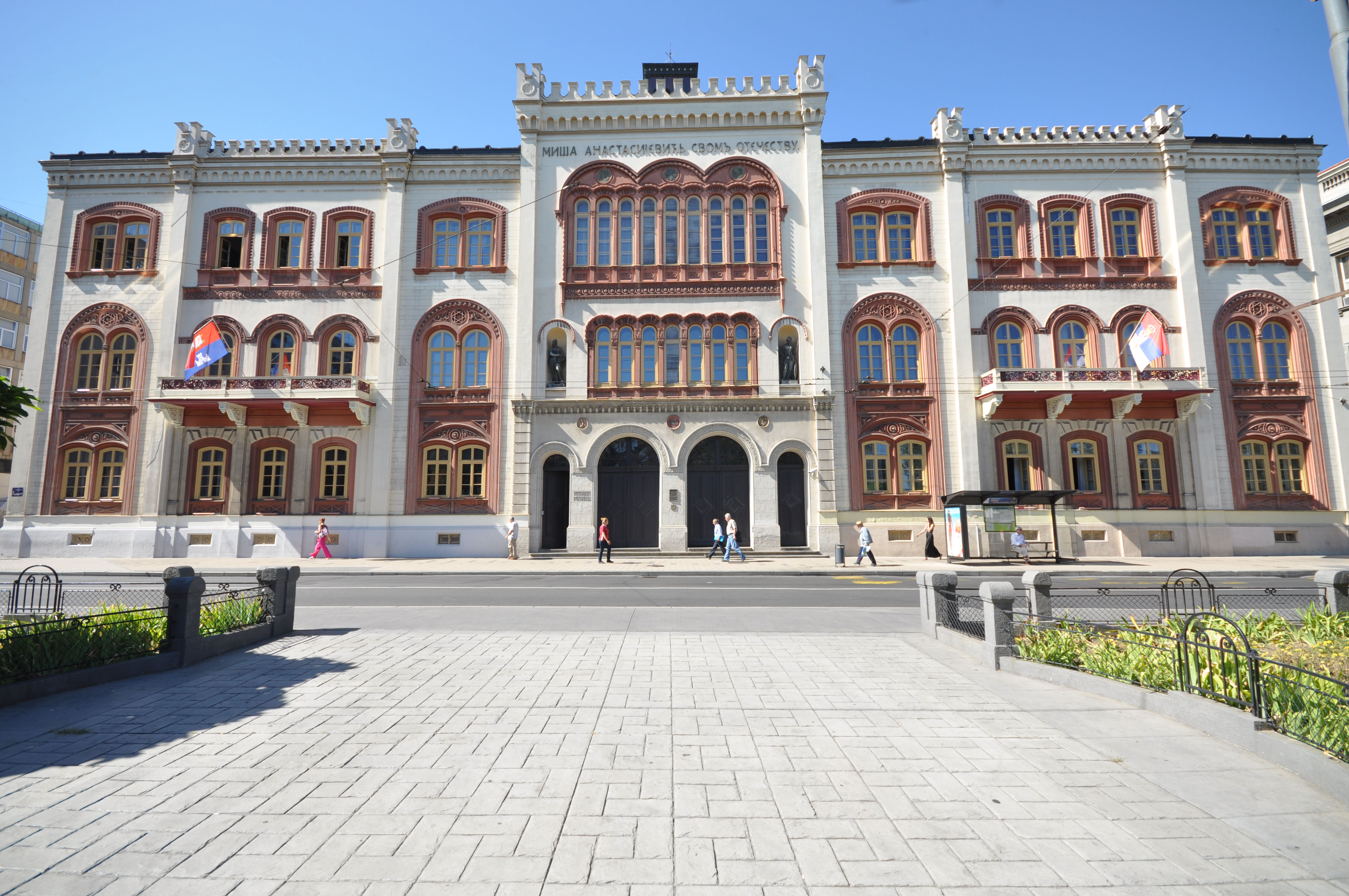
Rectorate building of the University of Belgrade, country's oldest university, founded in 1808

According to the 2022 census, the literacy rate in Serbia was 99.3% while computer literacy stood at 75.3% (complete computer literacy was 45.7% while 29.6% of persons had partial computer skills). (Note: In the 2022 Census, computer literacy was defined as the "ability of a person aged 15 and over to use basic computer applications in performing everyday tasks (at work, at school, and at home)". Accordingly, data were collected on whether respondents were able to perform word processing and create spreadsheets, search for information on the Internet, and whether they possessed electronic communication skills (such as sending and receiving email and using instant messaging applications).) The same census showed the following levels of educational attainment: 22.4% of inhabitants have higher education (16.4% have bachelor's degree or higher, 6% have an associate degree), 53% have a secondary education, 17.8% have an elementary education, 5.2% have not completed elementary education and 1% were without educational attainment.

Compulsory education comprises one year of preschool and eight grades of primary education. Preschool is attended at the age of six, after which children enrol in primary school, which they attend until the age of fourteen. Secondary education includes two types of schools, gymnasiums and vocational schools. Gymnasiums provide a general education, while vocational schools offer either four-year programmes preparing students for a particular profession or three-year programmes focused on crafts. In the 2022 PISA international study evaluating educational systems, Serbia ranked 40th, 41st, and 42nd out of 81 countries in the mathematics, science, and reading performance of 15-year-old students, respectively, with scores below the OECD average. Reflecting the performance of its high-achieving students, Serbia ranks 29th in the all-time medal table of the International Mathematical Olympiad with 96 medals, despite participating only since 1995.

Following the completion of gymnasiums or four-year vocational schools, students may pursue tertiary education, admission to which generally requires passing the Matura, the secondary school leaving examination. There are 17 universities in Serbia, eight public and nine private. The University of Belgrade is the country's largest and generally regarded as its leading institution of higher education, ranking in the 401–500 band of the 2024 Academic Ranking of World Universities. In addition, there are 71 "higher schools" (colleges) offering undergraduate education leading to an associate degree.

=== Health ===
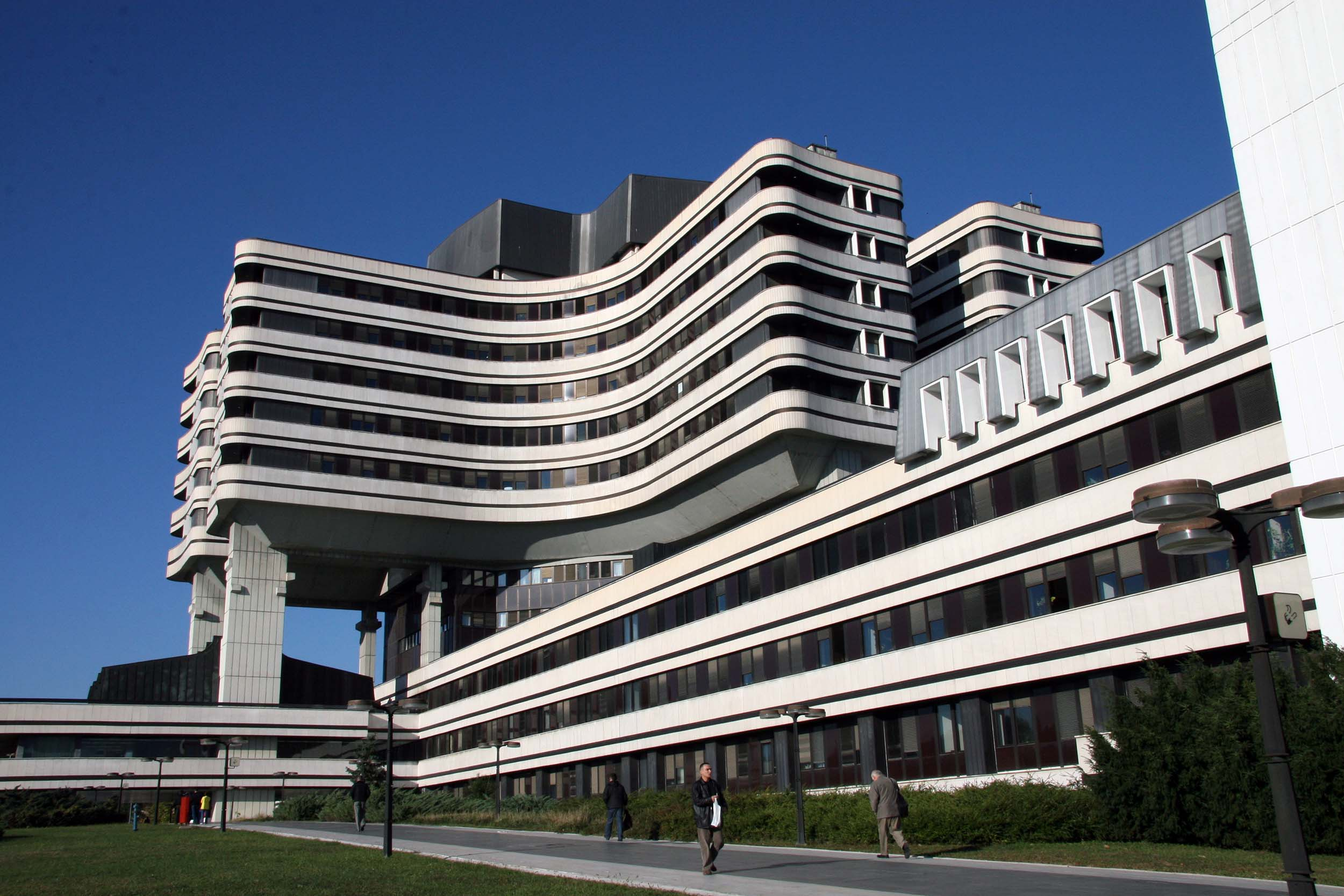
Military Medical Academy, one of major medical centres in the country

Serbia has a universal health care system largely financed by public health insurance. In 2023, Serbia spent 8% of its GDP on healthcare, amounting to $6.5 billion, or $983 per capita. As of 2024, the country had 21,248 medical doctors (310 per 100,000 inhabitants) and 41,137 hospital beds (600 per 100,000 inhabitants). The public healthcare network comprises 306 institutions, including five major medical centres, 47 general hospitals, 54 specialized hospitals as well as 151 community health centres providing primary healthcare. Alongside the public system, Serbia has a growing private healthcare sector comprising clinics and community healthcare centres, mostly operated by healthcare providers, as well as small private practices, primarily in dentistry and ophthalmology. Having emerged in the 1990s through the establishment of small private practices, the sector expanded rapidly over the past two decades with the development of clinics and community healthcare centres run by healthcare providers such as Acibadem, MediGroup, and Euromedik.

In 2023, Serbia had an average life expectancy of 76.7 years, ranking 68th worldwide, and a low infant mortality rate of 4.6 deaths per 1,000 live births. The principal cause of death in 2024 was cardiovascular disease, accounting for 47.7% of all deaths, followed by cancer at 21.7%. According to 2024 data, 33% of the adult population was overweight, while 24% was obese. In 2023, an estimated 39% of people aged 15 and over were smokers, the highest proportion of any European country. Although smoking is prohibited in most enclosed public spaces, cafés and restaurants remain exempt from the ban, making Serbia one of the few European countries where indoor smoking is still permitted. Serbia has a long-standing tradition of spa-based rehabilitation, with medical spas playing an important role in the treatment of chronic conditions and post-operative recovery. Rehabilitation in many medical spas is covered by the public health insurance system, contributing to their widespread use, particularly among the older population.

== Culture ==
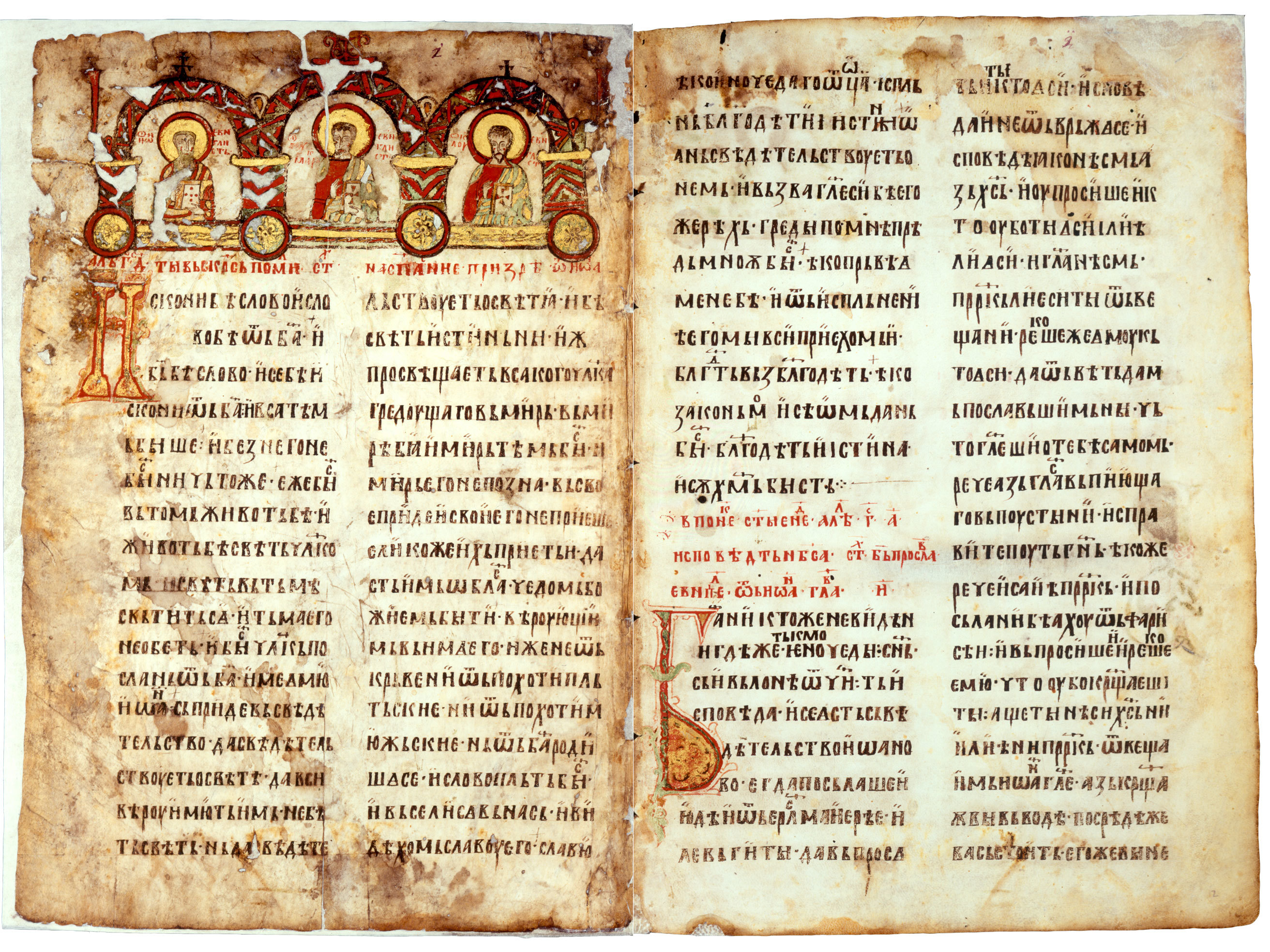
The Miroslav Gospel (1180), a 362-page illuminated manuscript

The cultural identity of Serbia was shaped by centuries of historical divisions and overlapping influences as its territory successively formed the frontier between the Byzantine Empire and Western Christendom, and later the Ottoman and Habsburg empires. These influences have produced a diverse cultural heritage, combining Byzantine, Central European and Balkan traditions in art, architecture, literature, music, with regional differences particularly evident between northern Serbia (Vojvodina), which has a more Central European character, and central and southern Serbia, which are predominantly Balkan in character.

Serbia has five World Heritage sites: the early medieval capital of Stari Ras (including the nearby 9th-century Church of Saints Peter and Paul and monasteries of Sopoćani and Đurđevi Stupovi), the 12th-century Studenica Monastery, the 3rd-century Roman palace complex of Felix Romuliana, late medieval stećak necropolises at three sites in southwestern Serbia, and the Medieval Monuments in Kosovo (comprising the Serbian Orthodox monasteries of Visoki Dečani, Gračanica and the Patriarchate of Peć as well as Serbian Orthodox church of Our Lady of Ljeviš). Six Serbian cultural traditions are inscribed on UNESCO's Intangible Cultural Heritage lists: slava (family patron saint veneration), kolo folk dance, traditional singing accompanied by the gusle, Zlakusa pottery, slivovitz-making and associated social practices, and the naïve painting practices of Kovačica. Four items from Serbia are inscribed on the Memory of the World Register: the 12th-century Miroslav Gospel manuscript, the 1914 telegram of Austria-Hungary's declaration of war on Serbia, the archives of Nikola Tesla, and the archives of the First Summit of the Non-Aligned Movement held in Belgrade in 1961.

=== Art and architecture ===
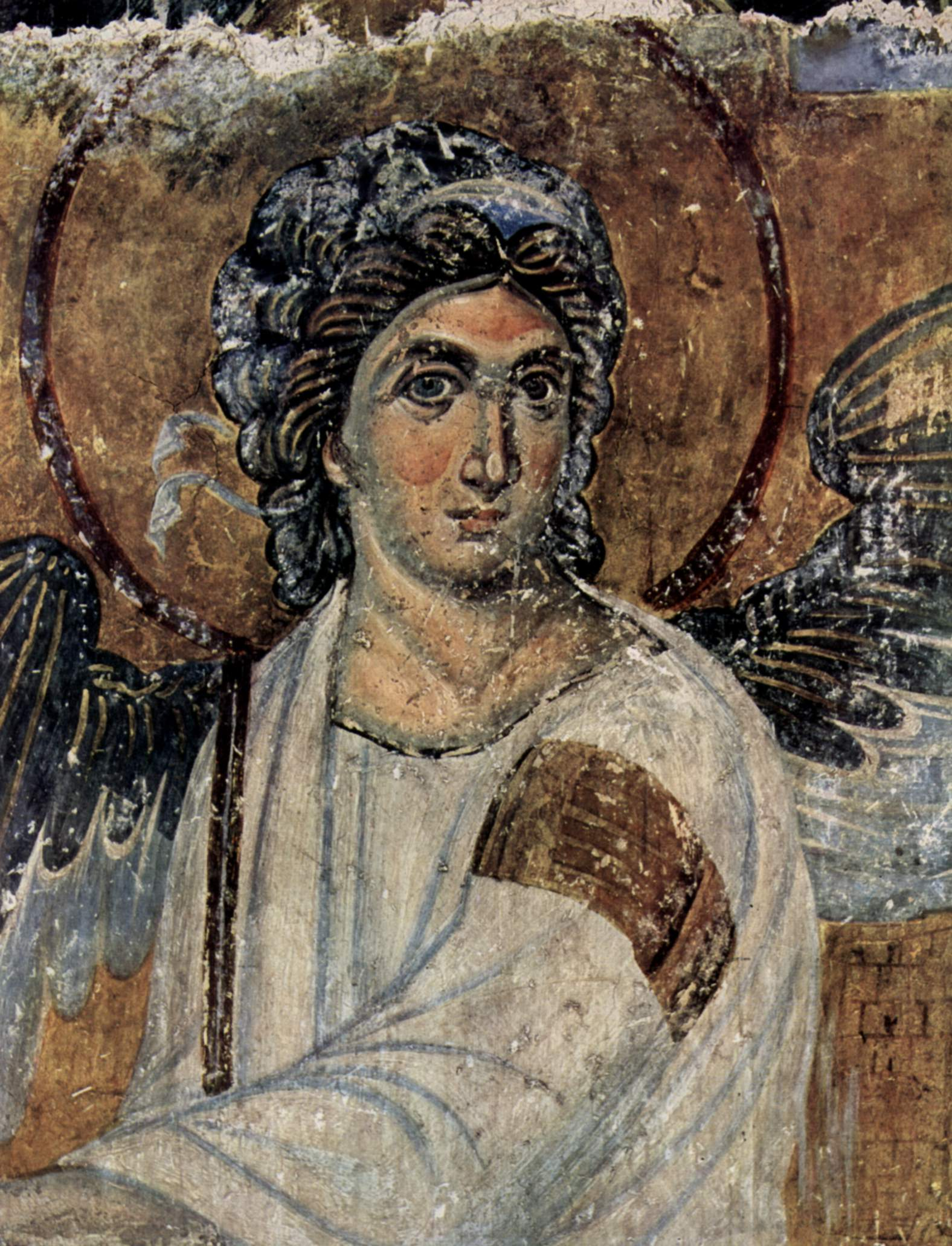
The White Angel (1235), fresco at Mileševa Monastery

The history of Serbian painting originates with medieval fresco painting of the Orthodox monasteries and churches, with the most notable frescoes such as the White Angel at Mileševa, the Crucifixion at Studenica, and the Dormition of the Virgin at Sopoćani, regarded among the finest achievements of Byzantine art. During Ottoman rule, artistic production was virtually non-existent and largely continued in the Habsburg-ruled regions inhabited by Serbs (present-day Vojvodina province), where baroque painters such as Nikola Nešković, Teodor Kračun and Jakov Orfelin emerged in the 18th century. The 19th century saw the development of Serbian academic painting. Neoclassicism and biedermeier gained prominence through painters such as Konstantin Danil, followed by romanticism of Đura Jakšić and Katarina Ivanović. By the late 19th and early 20th centuries, realism was dominated by Paja Jovanović and Uroš Predić. Modern art in the 20th century saw Serbian artists actively participating in major European modern movements. Impressionism and fauvism were introduced by Nadežda Petrović, while cubism and expressionism were embraced by artists such as Sava Šumanović, Milan Konjović, and Milena Pavlović-Barili. In the contemporary period, the art scene expanded into modern abstraction, surrealism, and figurative art, led by Petar Lubarda, Marko Čelebonović, and Vladimir Veličković. Serbia is also known for the tradition of naïve art centred in the small town of Kovačica, whose distinctive painting school has gained international recognition.

The applied arts are deeply tied to Serbian traditional craftsmanship. The best-known examples include the Pirot carpet (Pirotski ćilim), a flat-woven tapestry renowned for its geometric patterns, and the distinctive Zlakusa pottery, a specialized style of unglazed hand-wheel ceramics mixed with ground calcite. Other traditional crafts such as embroidery and woodworking are also an integral part of the country's decorative arts tradition.

In contemporary performance art, Serbia is best known internationally through Marina Abramović, one of the world's most influential performance artists, known for her pioneering body art and endurance pieces.

Serbia's architectural heritage spans from the Roman period, represented by sites such as Felix Romuliana, to the medieval monasteries and fortifications that rank among the country's most important cultural monuments. Medieval Serbian architecture developed under strong Byzantine influence, exemplified by the monasteries of Visoki Dečani, Gračanica, Studenica, and Mileševa. It later evolved into the distinct, decorative Morava style of the late 14th and 15th centuries, characterized by richly ornamented church façades; examples include Kalenić, Ravanica, and Ljubostinja monasteries. The country has many well-preserved medieval fortifications and castles such as Smederevo Fortress (largest lowland fortress in Europe), Manasija, and Golubac as well as early modern sprawling fortifications of Belgrade and Petrovaradin fortresses. The rapid urban development of the late 19th and early 20th centuries left a rich architectural legacy, particularly in the towns of Vojvodina, where cities such as Novi Sad, Subotica, Sombor and Zrenjanin are noted for their well-preserved historic centres featuring prominent examples of art nouveau, renaissance revival, and baroque revival architecture. During the same period, Belgrade acquired many of its landmark public buildings in neoclassical style, while the 20th century saw the emergence of notable modern and brutalist architecture, the latter most notably displayed in the planned socialist-era urbanism of New Belgrade.

There are 31 art museums in Serbia, including the National Museum of Serbia, founded in 1844, which houses one of the largest art collections in Southeast Europe. Other art museums with internationally significant collections include the Museum of Contemporary Art in Belgrade and the Gallery of Matica srpska in Novi Sad.

=== Literature ===
Serbian literature originated in the medieval period and was predominantly religious in character, consisting of gospels, hagiographies, psalters, sermons, and theological writings. Saint Sava and Jefimija laid the foundations of Serbian literary tradition. During the centuries of Ottoman rule, oral literature and epic poetry became central to preserving historical memory and cultural identity. The oldest known, entirely fictional poems make up the "Non-historic cycle", which is followed by the "Kosovo cycles" (poems inspired by events before, during, and after the Battle of Kosovo) forming the most significant body of South Slavic oral literature.

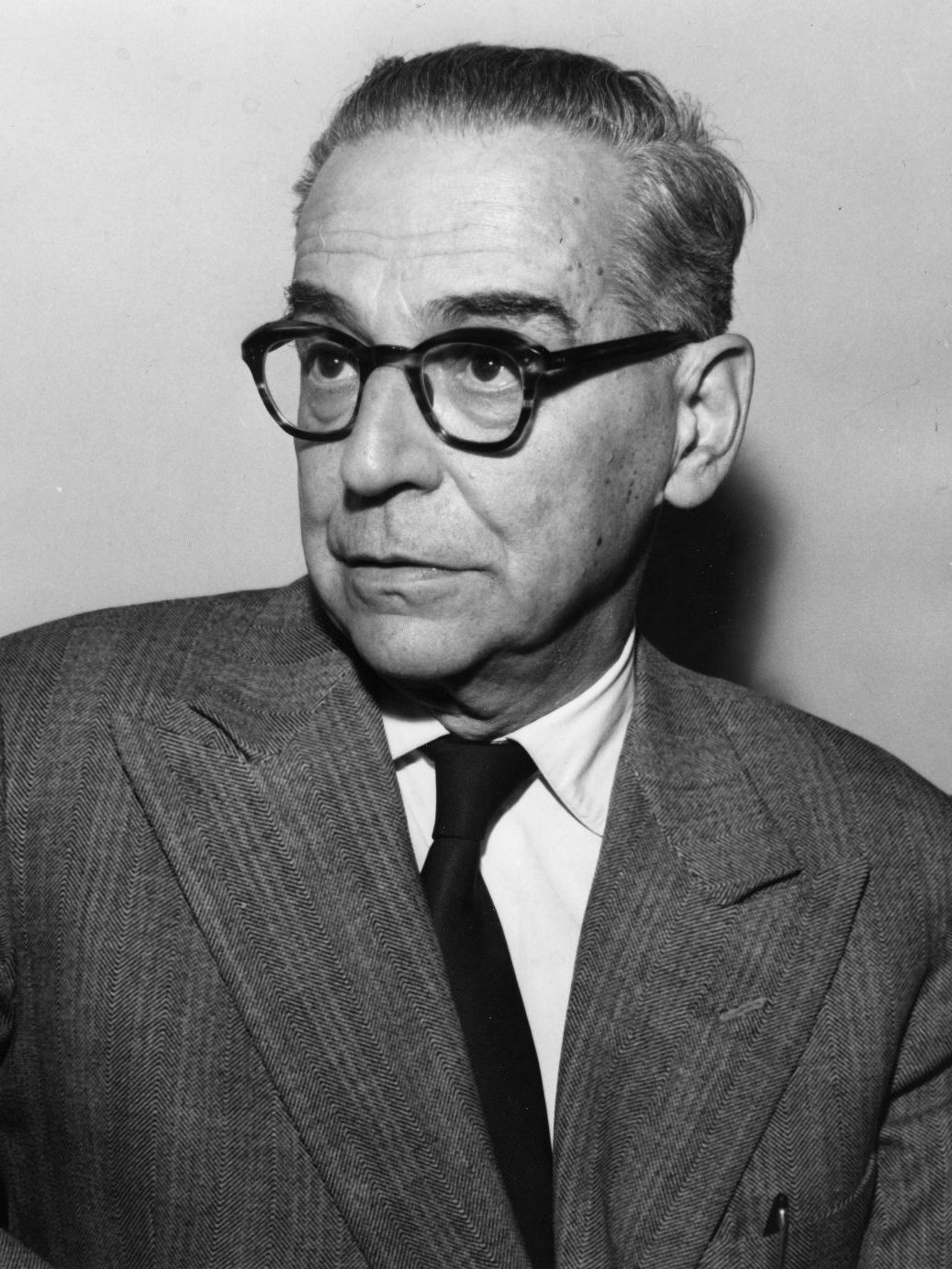
Ivo Andrić, winner of the 1961 Nobel Prize in Literature

Modern Serbian literature emerged during the 19th-century national revival through the language reforms of Vuk Karadžić, whose standardization of the Serbian literary language and collection of folk poetry profoundly shaped national culture. Romanticism flourished through poets such as Branko Radičević and Laza Kostić, giving way in the later 19th century to a strong realist movement featuring prose writers like Borisav Stanković and Stevan Sremac.

In the early 20th century, modernist and symbolist poetry was represented by Jovan Dučić, Milan Rakić, and Vladislav Petković Dis. During the interwar period, Serbian literature became increasingly experimental, with the avant-garde movement producing influential writers such as Miloš Crnjanski and Rastko Petrović. In the second half of the 20th century, Serbian literature gained global recognition, marked by Ivo Andrić winning the Nobel Prize in 1961 for works such as The Bridge on the Drina. Other major postwar figures include Borislav Pekić, Meša Selimović, Danilo Kiš, and Dobrica Ćosić.

Among contemporary writers, Milorad Pavić is the most critically acclaimed and internationally recognized. His Dictionary of the Khazars is widely regarded as one of the defining works of postmodern literature, became an international bestseller during the late 1980s and 1990s, and has been translated into 40 languages. Today, Serbian literature remains internationally visible through novelists Svetislav Basara, David Albahari, and Zoran Živković, whose science fiction works have been published in 20 languages.

Serbia has a dense network of public libraries, with more than 535 institutions nationwide. The largest are the National Library of Serbia in Belgrade, with 6.5 million items, and Library of Matica srpska in Novi Sad, founded in 1826 and the oldest Serbian cultural institution, with around 4 million items. Book publishing remains active and the annual Belgrade Book Fair, attracting more than 200,000 visitors, is the country's largest cultural event. The most prestigious literary award is the NIN Award, given annually since 1954 for the best newly published novel in Serbian.

=== Music ===
Music in Serbia encompasses medieval traditions, classical composition, folk music and a diverse popular music scene.

Traditional Serbian music includes a variety of vocal and instrumental forms. The gusle, a one-string bowed instrument, has accompanied the singing of epic poetry since the Middle Ages, with records of its use at the Serbian royal court in the early 13th century. Performed by guslari, these poems preserve historical events and mythology and remain among the best-known expressions of Serbian oral tradition.

Composer and musicologist Stevan Mokranjac is regarded as the founder of modern Serbian art music, having played a key role in the development of Serbian national musical expression in the late 19th and early 20th centuries. The first generation of Serbian composers, including Petar Konjović, Stevan Hristić and Miloje Milojević, continued the national tradition while introducing modern influences, particularly from Impressionism. Among contemporary composers, Isidora Žebeljan is the most internationally performed Serbian composer of the 21st century, acclaimed for her operas, orchestral works, and chamber music that combine Balkan folk elements with contemporary compositional techniques. Among recognized performers are violinists Stefan Milenković and Nemanja Radulović, both known for their successful international careers. Serbia's classical music institutions include three opera houses and four symphony orchestras, while the Belgrade Music Festival is among the leading classical music festivals in Southeastern Europe.

Balkan brass, or truba ("trumpet"), emerged in central Serbia during the late nineteenth century following the introduction of military brass orchestras, eventually developing into a distinctive musical tradition associated with celebrations. The genre gained international recognition through performers such as Boban Marković, while the work of Belgrade-based composer and musician Goran Bregović, whose compositions frequently incorporate Balkan brass traditions, has further popularized the genre among international audiences.

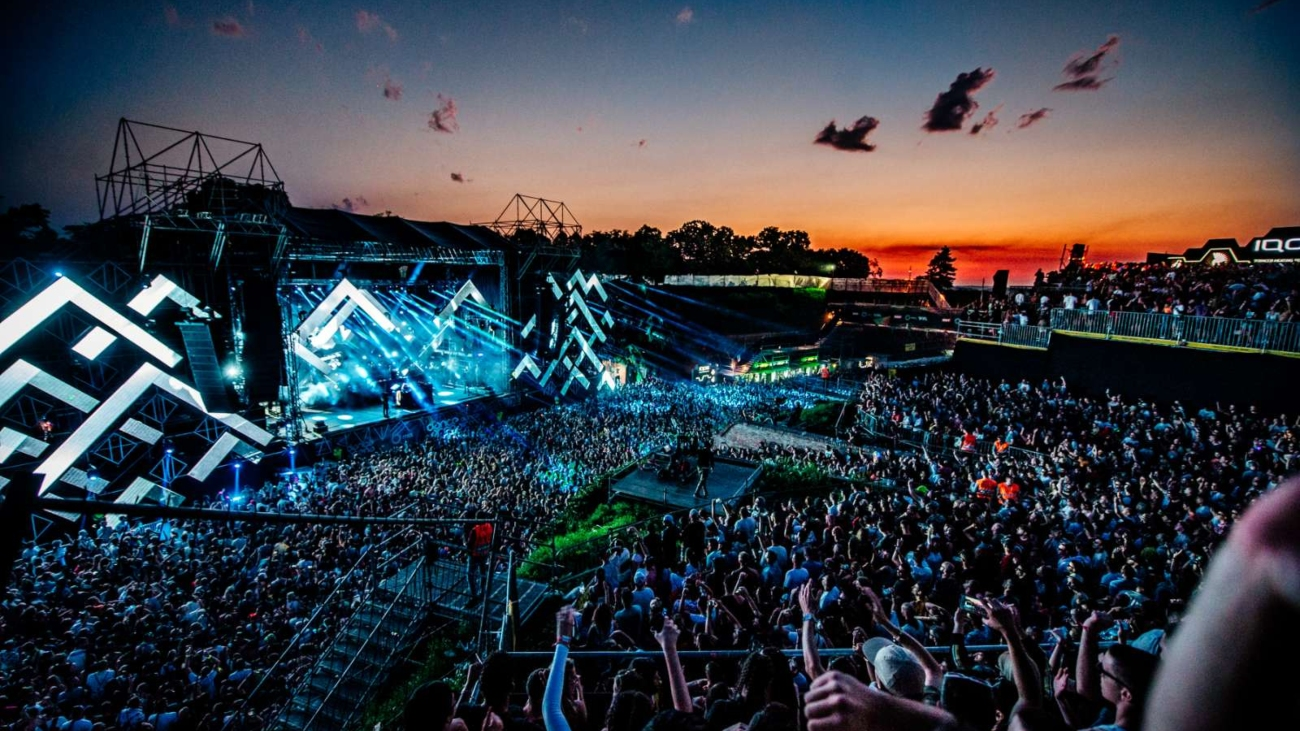
Main stage at Exit music festival in Novi Sad

Serbian folk music has remained the country's most popular musical genre, evolving from traditional rural music into commercially successful popular folk. The genre gained wider popularity during the interwar period through performers such as Sofka Nikolić, the earliest major star of popular music in Serbia, and was later continued by prominent singers including Predrag Živković Tozovac, Toma Zdravković, Lepa Lukić, and Miroslav Ilić.

Turbo-folk, a genre combining traditional folk music with pop, dance and electronic influences, emerged in Serbia during the late 1980s and early 1990s. Despite frequent cultural and political controversy, it became the most commercially successful genre of Serbian popular music, enjoying immense popularity throughout the former Yugoslavia as well as in Bulgaria. Notable performers include Ceca, Lepa Brena, Aca Lukas, Saša Matić, and recent acts such as Aleksandra Prijović and Tea Tairović.

Serbian pop music has achieved certain international recognition through the Eurovision Song Contest. Željko Joksimović finished second at the 2004 contest, while Marija Šerifović won the 2007 contest, securing Serbia's first Eurovision victory. The most prominent and enduring figures of Serbian pop music are singer Zdravko Čolić and singer-songwriter Đorđe Balašević, both of whom have remained popular across multiple generations.

Serbian rock music developed within the broader Yugoslav cultural space and formed an important part of the Yugoslav rock scene from the 1960s onwards, producing influential bands including Riblja Čorba, Bajaga i Instruktori, Ekatarina Velika, Smak and Električni Orgazam. Although several major acts have remained popular, the genre's mainstream popularity has declined in recent decades.

Serbian hip-hop replaced rock as the country's most popular urban music genre, with new generations of artists achieving significant popularity through digital platforms. It emerged during the late 1980s and gained wider popularity from the 1990s onwards, producing influential performers across underground and commercial styles, including Gru, Bad Copy, and Beogradski Sindikat. In recent years, trap has become particularly popular among younger audiences with acts such as Rasta, Devito, and Voyage.

Serbia hosts numerous internationally recognized music festivals. The Guča Trumpet Festival in the small town of Guča is the world's largest celebration of brass band music, with attendance figures reaching around 300,000 visitors in peak years. Exit in Novi Sad is one of Europe's best-known contemporary music festivals and has attracted over 200,000 visitors in some editions. Other major events include the Nišville jazz festival in Niš and Gitarijada in Zaječar, one of Europe's longest-running rock festivals. Following Serbia's victory at the 2007 contest, Belgrade hosted the 2008 Eurovision Song Contest.

=== Cinema and theatre ===
Serbia has a rich cinematic tradition dating back to 1911, when the first Serbian feature film, The Life and Deeds of Karađorđe, was released, making it one of the earliest feature films produced in Central and Eastern Europe. The Yugoslav Film Archives, with more than 100,000 film prints, is among the five largest film archives in the world.

The country has one of Europe's most dynamic smaller film industries. In 2025, 36 feature films were produced, with domestic productions attracting a comparatively large audience and accounting for around one-fifth of the more than 4 million cinema admissions recorded. The film industry is heavily subsidized by the state, mainly through the Film Centre of Serbia, which provides grants for film production.

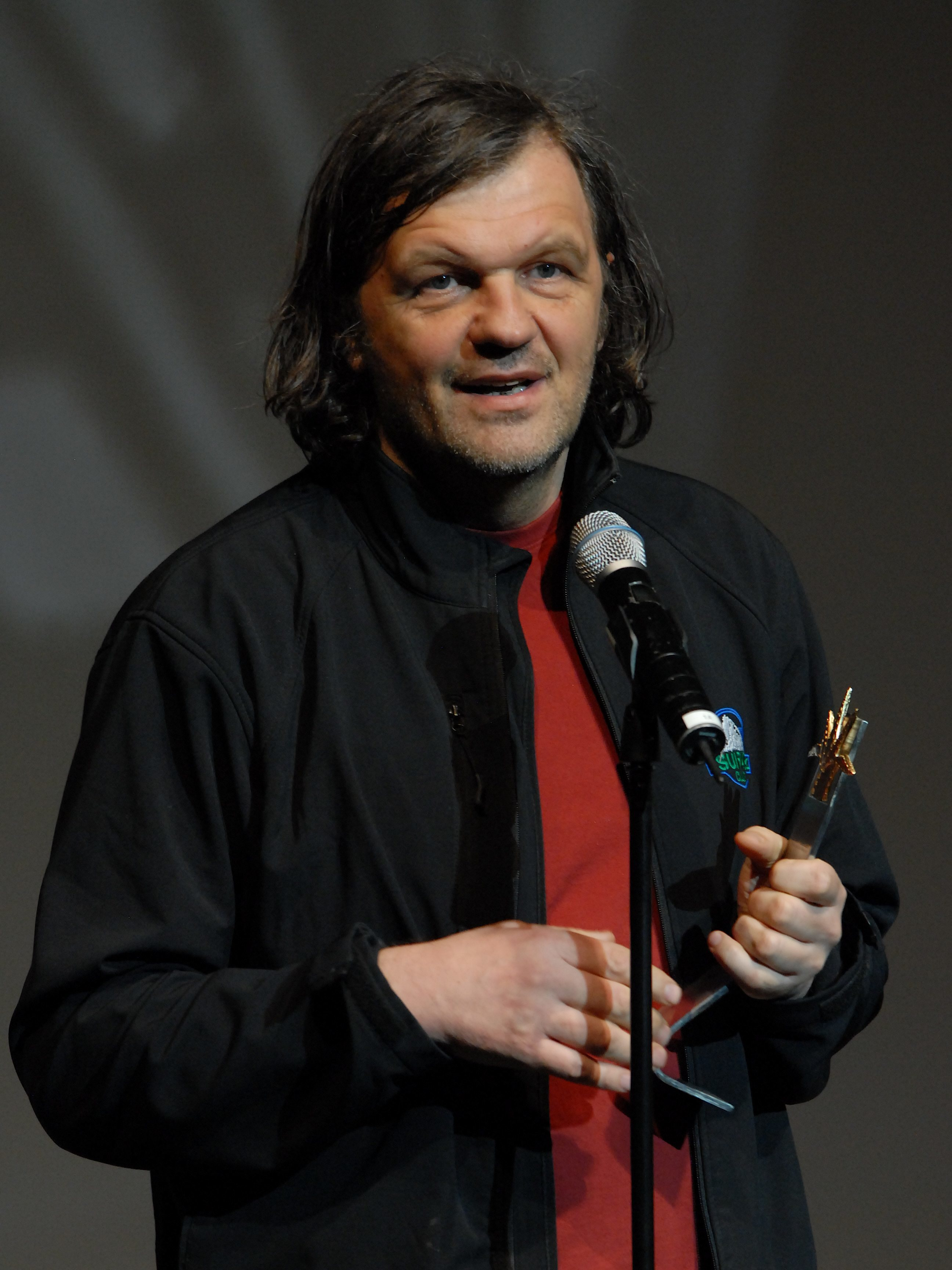
Film director Emir Kusturica, two-time winner of the Palme d'Or at the Cannes Film Festival

Serbian filmmakers have received widespread international recognition across feature, short, and documentary filmmaking. In feature films, Emir Kusturica is one of the few directors to have won two Palmes d'Or at the Cannes Film Festival, while Želimir Žilnik won the Golden Bear at the Berlin International Film Festival. Stefan Arsenijević received the Golden Bear for Best Short Film, while Mila Turajlić won the top award at the International Documentary Film Festival Amsterdam. Serbian-American screenwriter Steve Tesich won the Academy Award for Best Original Screenplay in 1979 for Breaking Away. Among Serbia's most acclaimed screen actors are Miki Manojlović, whose career has included numerous internationally recognized productions, and Milena Dravić, one of the country's most celebrated actresses, who received the Cannes Film Festival Award for Best Actress in 1980.

The FEST was a prominent film festival during the 1970s and 1980s, presenting major international films and filmmakers. Although its international profile has largely declined since the 1990s, it remains an important cultural event in Serbia.

The country has a significant theatrical tradition dating to the early 19th century. Joakim Vujić is regarded as the founder of modern Serbian theatre, while the Princely Serbian Theatre in Kragujevac, established in 1835, is the country's oldest continuously operating theatre. Serbian theatre has been shaped by playwrights such as Jovan Sterija Popović and Branislav Nušić, while contemporary theatre is represented by acclaimed writers such as Dušan Kovačević and Biljana Srbljanović. The Belgrade International Theatre Festival – BITEF, founded in 1967, is prominent for presenting contemporary and experimental international theatre. The Sterijino pozorje festival, established in 1956, is dedicated to Serbian drama and the promotion of domestic theatrical production.

=== Media ===
Freedom of the media is guaranteed by the Constitution of Serbia. However, the country was ranked 104th out of 180 countries in the 2026 World Press Freedom Index. The report noted that media outlets and journalists continue to face partisan and government pressure over editorial policies.

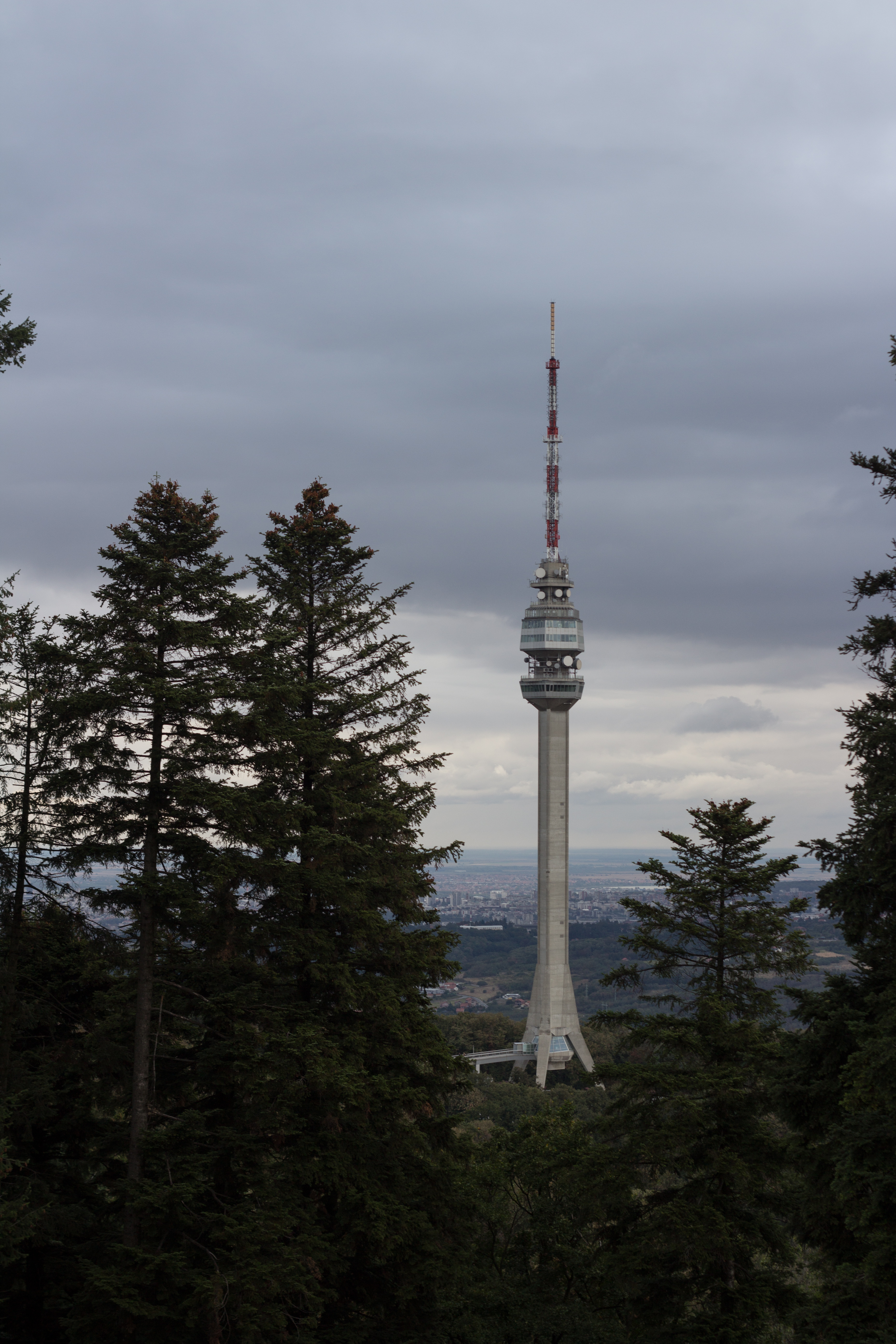
Avala Tower, a 204-metre-high television and radio transmission tower

Television remains a traditional source of news and entertainment. Digital terrestrial broadcasting accounts for only a marginal share of television reception, as approximately 94% of households receive television through subscription-based platforms (cable television, IPTV, and direct-to-home satellite services), making Serbia one of the world's most highly penetrated pay television markets. In addition to carrying three channels of the public broadcaster, Radio Television of Serbia (RTS), as well as free-to-air nationwide commercial, regional, and local channels, these platforms distribute dozens of additional domestic commercial channels, ranging from general-interest networks to specialized services devoted to sports, news, music, and documentaries. They also provide access to numerous international channels, some of which are available with Serbian subtitles.

Radio occupies a more limited role in Serbia's media landscape. The public broadcaster, RTS, operates the nationwide Radio Belgrade network of three stations, alongside numerous commercial national, regional, and local radio stations. In addition to FM broadcasting, the country's digital audio broadcasting network provides coverage to more than 90% of the population.

Print media in Serbia has undergone a significant decline in the last two decades, with newspaper and magazine circulation falling sharply as audiences have increasingly shifted to digital platforms. Politika, founded in 1904, is the oldest continuously published daily newspaper in the Balkans and is widely regarded as Serbia's newspaper of record. Serbian newspapers today operate primarily through their online editions, which reach substantially larger audiences than their printed versions. Leading tabloid newspapers such as Blic and Kurir are among Serbia's most visited general news sites. In contrast to the global trend among newspapers toward adopting digital subscription models, Serbian newspapers generally rely on advertising and free access rather than paid subscriptions. The magazine market has been even more affected, with numerous titles no longer being published, while those that remain have generally experienced rapidly declining circulation. Among the magazines that have retained a relatively strong readership is the popular science magazine Politikin Zabavnik, founded in 1939. Only a limited number of magazines, such as the news weeklies Nedeljnik and Vreme, have developed significant digital subscriber bases.

Social media play an increasingly significant role in Serbia's media environment, with global platforms such as X widely used for accessing news, sharing information, and engaging in public discourse.

=== Cuisine ===
Serbian cuisine is largely heterogeneous in a way characteristic of the Balkans, with heavy Central European, Oriental, and Mediterranean influences. It features dishes typical of Turkish cuisine as well as cuisines originating from Central Europe, especially Hungarian cuisine. Food is very important in Serbian social life, particularly during religious holidays such as Christmas, Easter, and feast days such as the slava.

Staples of the Serbian diet include bread, meat, fruits, vegetables, and dairy products. Bread plays an important role in Serbian cuisine and features prominently in religious rituals. Meat is widely consumed, while fish is eaten to a lesser extent. The southern city of Leskovac is host to Roštiljijada, one of the largest barbecue festivals in Europe.

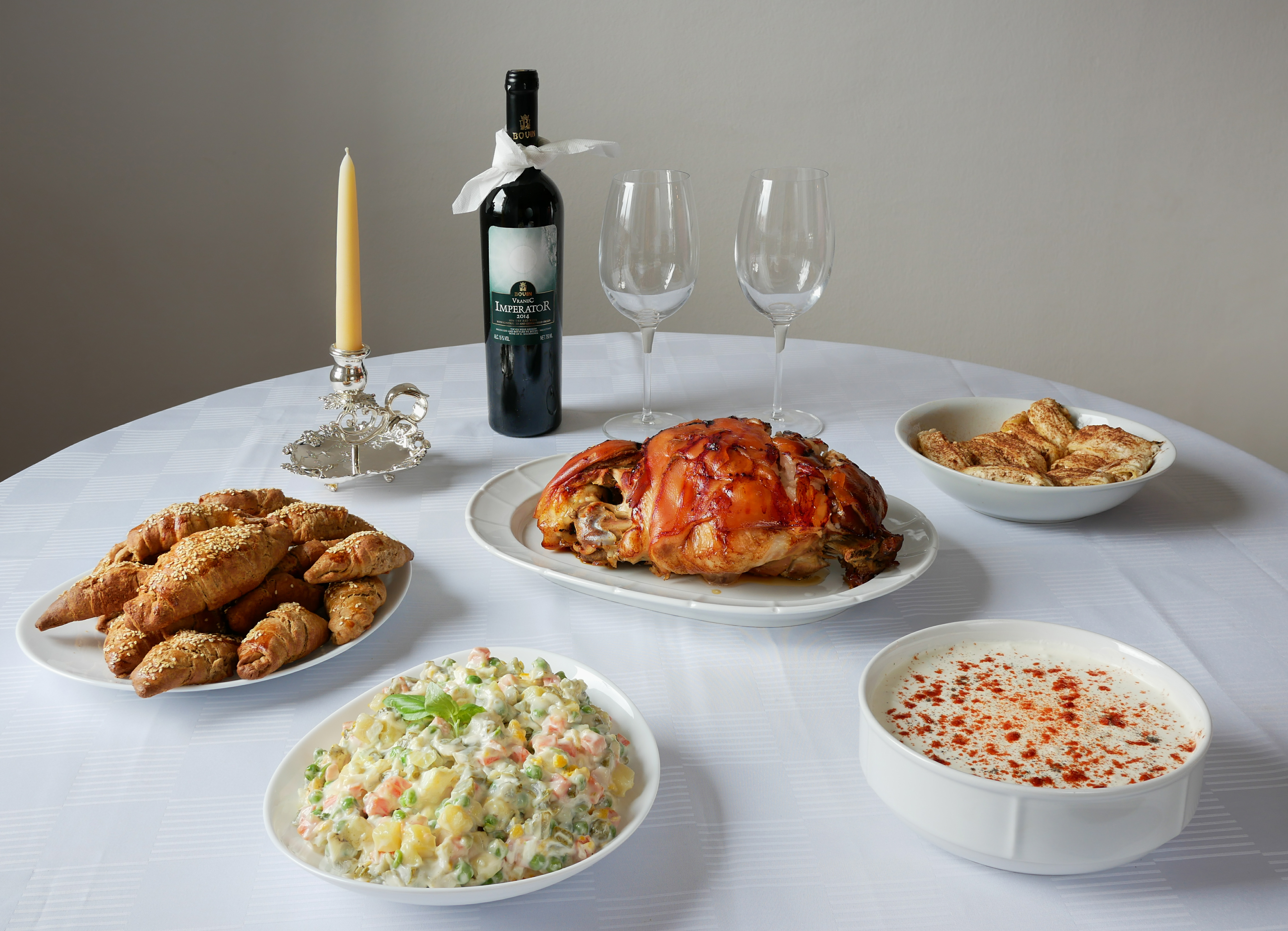
The traditional Serbian Christmas table features roast pork, hearty soup, crescent rolls, and Olivier salad, accompanied by wine or rakija.

Serbian specialties include ćevapčići (grilled and seasoned caseless sausages made from minced meat), pljeskavica (grilled spiced meat patty made from a mixture of pork, beef, and lamb), Karađorđeva šnicla (veal or pork schnitzel that is stuffed with kaymak), gibanica (cheese pie), burek (baked pastry made from a thin flaky dough that is stuffed with meat or cheese), sarma (stuffed leaves), punjena paprika (stuffed peppers), đuveč (meat and vegetable stew), pasulj (bean stew), podvarak (roast meat with sauerkraut), ajvar (roasted red pepper spread), kajmak (dairy product similar to clotted cream), čvarci (variant of pork rinds), proja (cornbread), and kačamak (maize porridge).

Serbians claim their country as the birthplace of rakia (rakija), a highly alcoholic fruit brandy, although it is found in various forms throughout the Balkans. Slivovitz (šljivovica), or plum brandy, is Serbia's national drink and its traditional rakia, distilled from plums, the country's national fruit. Serbia is the world's largest exporter of Slivovitz and the second-largest plum producer. Slivovitz holds a prominent place in Serbian culture: it is served as an aperitif, offered at the start or end of meals, and present at every major life event (birth, baptism, wedding, funeral) as well as at slava.

Serbia also has a long winemaking tradition, dating back to Roman times in the 3rd century AD. Serbian wines are produced in 22 viticulture regions, the most important ones being Fruška Gora, Šumadija, Aleksandrovačka župa, and Vršac Mountains. Besides rakia and wine, beer is a very popular alcoholic beverage in the country with pale lagers being the traditional choice for Serbians. The most popular domestic brands of beer are Jelen and Zaječarsko.

As in the rest of the Balkans, coffee culture is an important cultural and social practice and Serbian coffee (a local variant of Turkish coffee) is the most commonly consumed non-alcoholic beverage.

=== Sports ===
Despite its relatively small population, Serbia has established an international reputation for producing world-class athletes and successful national teams across a wide range of sports.

Football, basketball, and tennis are the three most popular sports in Serbia. According to a 2025 nationwide survey, 37% of respondents named football as their favourite sport, followed by basketball (33%) and tennis (13%).

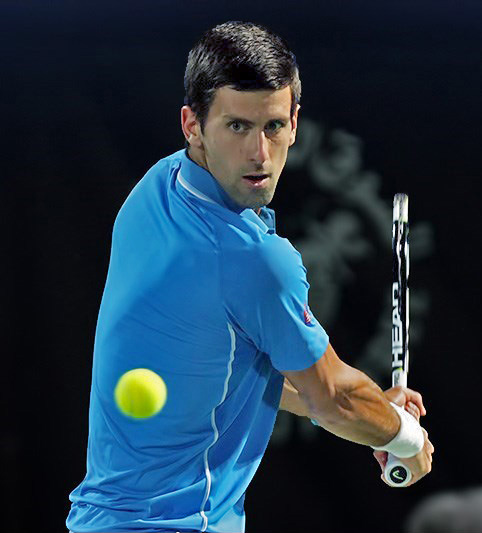
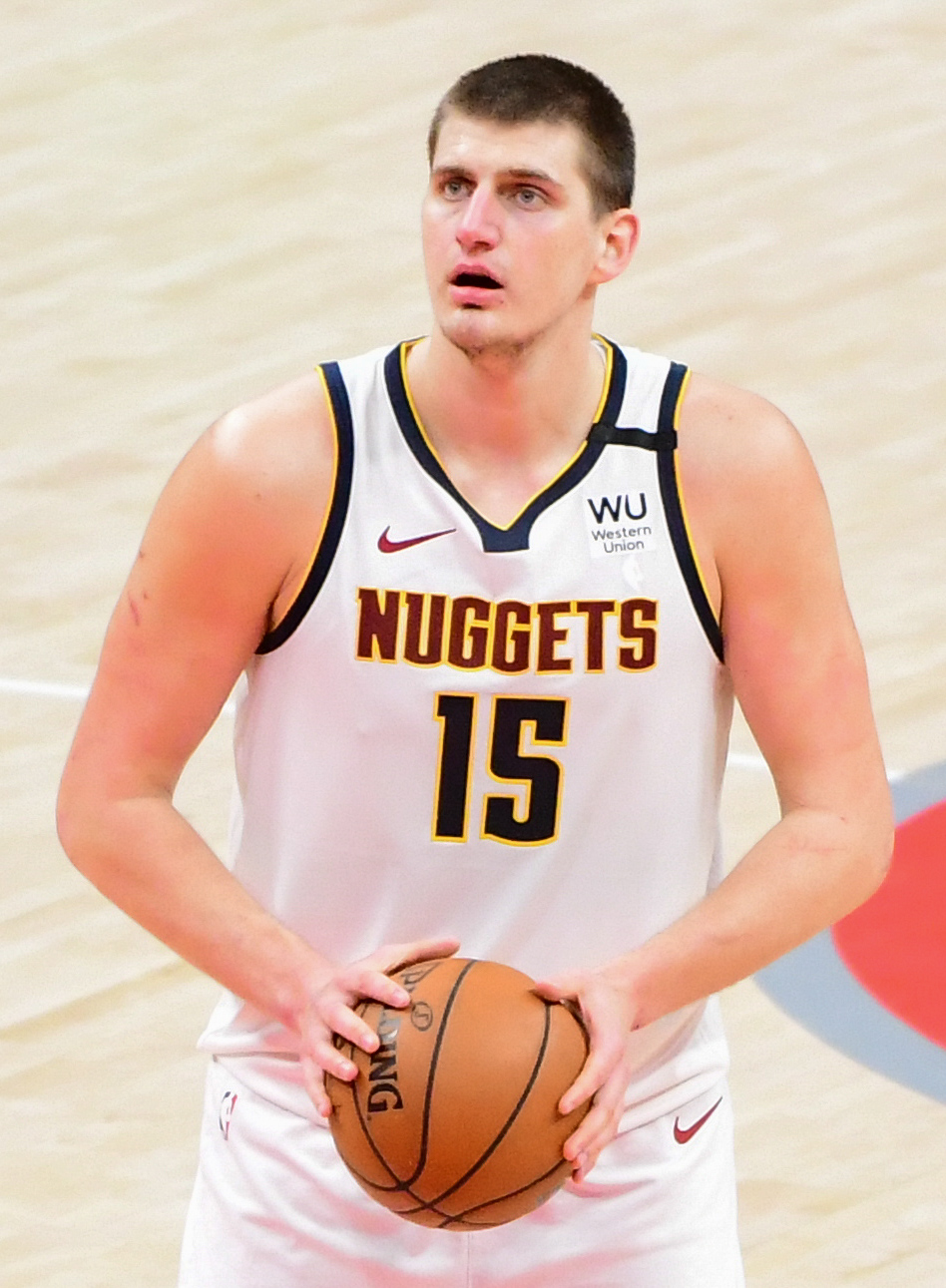
Tennis player Novak Djokovic (left), the record holder with 24 Grand Slam titles; basketball player Nikola Jokić (right), a three-time NBA Most Valuable Player.

Much of Serbia's sporting culture is centred on historic multi-sport clubs, particularly Red Star and Partizan, whose sections compete in various sports. Their various sections have achieved sustained success across numerous sports, including Red Star's triumph in football's European Cup in 1991, the predecessor of today's UEFA Champions League, and Partizan's European Champions Cup title in basketball in 1992, the predecessor of the modern EuroLeague.

Football attracts the largest spectator audiences and has the highest number of registered participants. Serbia's two leading football clubs, Red Star and Partizan, have storied histories, with Red Star winning the European Cup in 1991, while Partizan became the first club from Eastern Europe to reach the competition's final in 1966. Their rivalry, known as the "Eternal derby", ranks among Europe's best-known and fiercest football rivalries, and a defining feature of the country's football culture. The national team has qualified for three of the last four World Cups but lacks significant success.

Basketball is one of Serbia's greatest sporting strengths, with the country regarded as one of the world's leading basketball nations. The men's national team has won two World Cups, three EuroBasket titles, two Olympic silver medals, and a bronze medal in 2024. The women's national team has won two EuroBasket titles and an Olympic bronze medal. A total of 34 Serbian players have played in the NBA, the fourth-highest number of any country outside the United States, including Nikola Jokić, a three-time NBA Most Valuable Player.

The recent success of Serbian tennis players has led to a surge in the sport's popularity in Serbia. Novak Djokovic, widely regarded as the greatest tennis player in history, has won a record 24 Grand Slam titles, a record 40 Masters, a record seven year-end championships, and an Olympic gold medal; he has been ranked as the world No. 1 for a record 428 weeks and finished as the year-end No. 1 a record eight times.

Serbia is also among the world's leading nations in water polo, with the men's national team winning three Olympic gold medals, three World Championships, and seven European Championships. The country's volleyball teams have likewise achieved major international success, including Olympic and World Championship medals for both men and women.

== See also ==
- Outline of Serbia
