= Montenegrin cuisine =

Culinary traditions of Montenegro

Montenegrin cuisine is a result of Montenegro's geographic position and its long history and tradition.

== Review ==
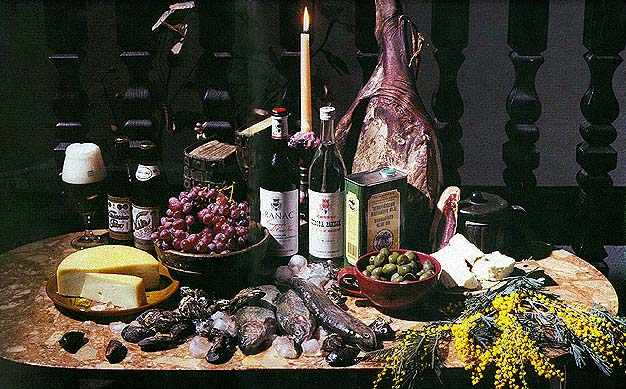
Foods from Montenegro

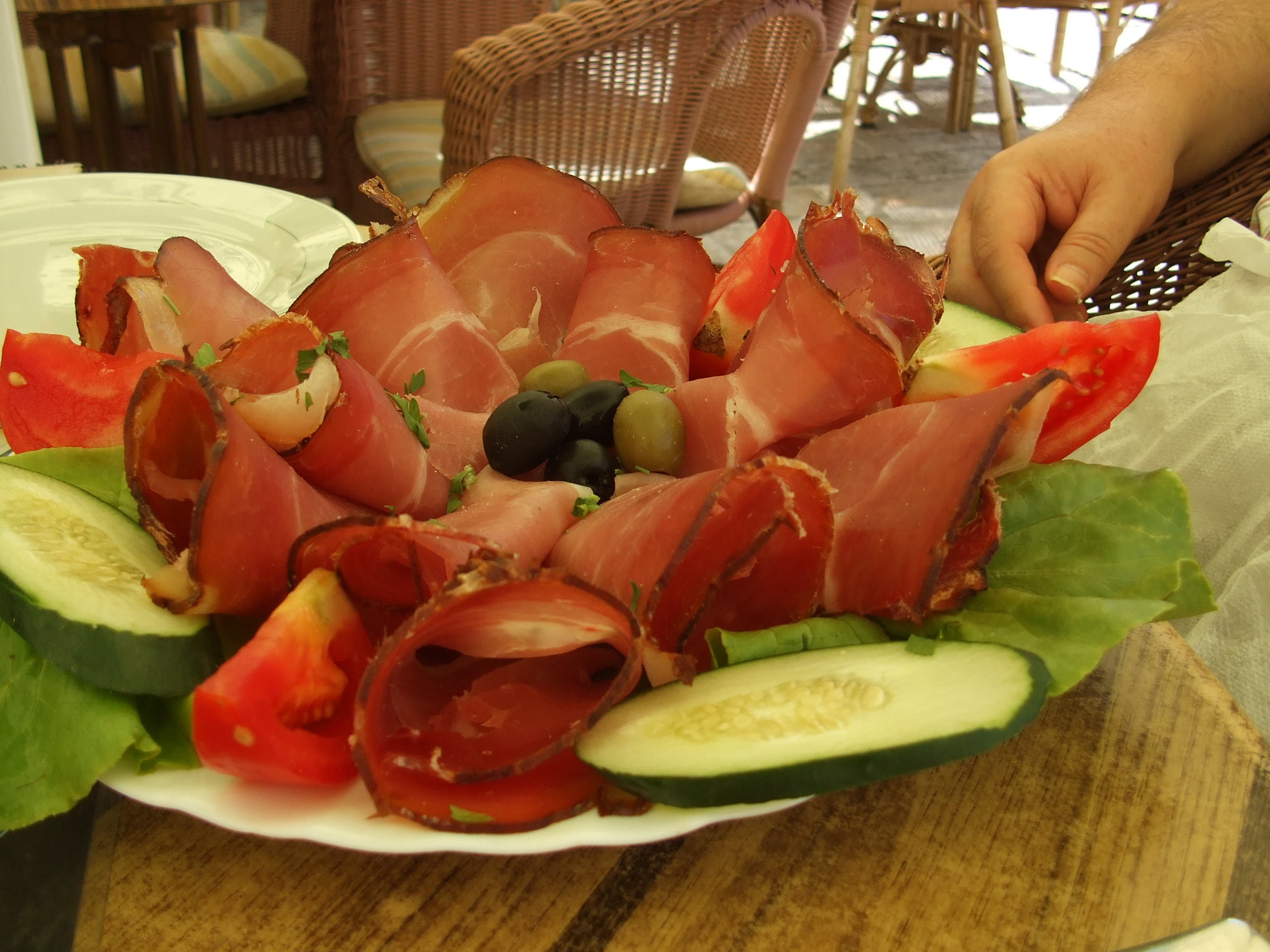
Njeguški pršut with salad

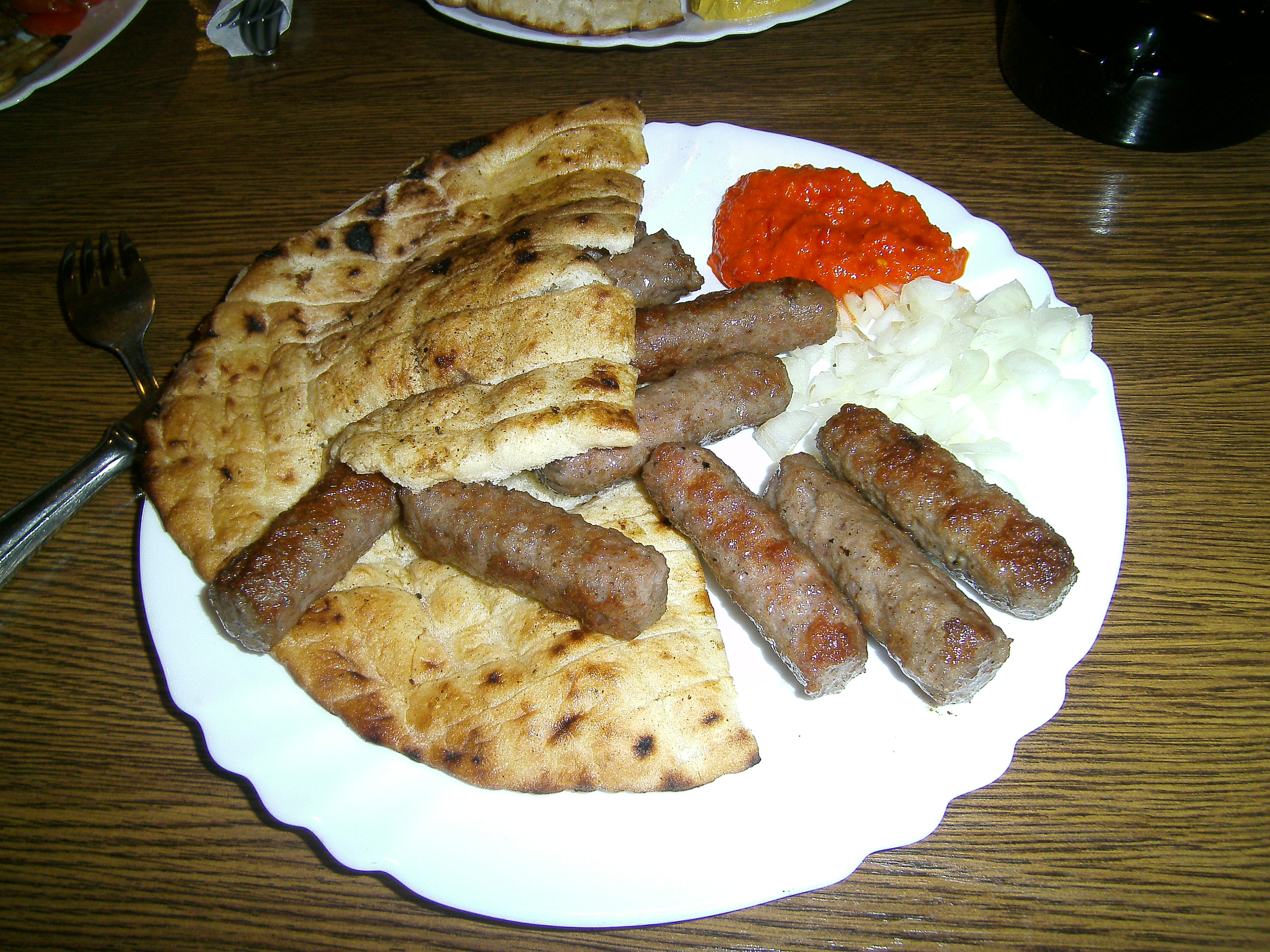
Ćevapi with lepinja, ajvar and onion

The first major influences to Montenegrin cuisine came from the Levant and Turkey, largely via Serbia: sarma, musaka, pilav, pita, gibanica, burek, ćevapi, kebab, đuveč, and Turkish sweets such as baklava and tulumba.

Hungarian cuisine influences stews and sataraš. Central European cuisine is evident in the prevalence of crêpes, doughnuts, jams, many types of biscuits and cakes, and various kinds of breads.

Montenegrin cuisine also varies geographically; the cuisine in the coastal area differs from that of the northern highland region. The coastal area is traditionally a representative of Mediterranean cuisine, with seafood being a common dish. The traditional dishes of Montenegro's Adriatic coast, unlike its heartland, have a distinctively Italian influence as well.

== Common dishes ==
=== Bread ===
Homemade-style bread prepared in Montenegro is closest to what is known in Italy as pane casareccio. It is served with every meal. Types include ječmeni (barley bread), ražani (rye bread), pšenični (wheat bread), and rumetinov (corn bread).

=== Breakfast ===
- Cicvara - stewed cornmeal with kaymak (salted and then compressed fresh cream).
- Gibanica with yoghurt or kisjelo mlijeko (buttermilk).
- Popara and bread with kajmak
- Pršut (most notable is njeguški pršut)

=== Soups ===
Montenegrin language distinguishes between a clear soup (supa, pronounced [ˈsupə]), a thick soup or stew (čorba, pronounced [ˈtʃɔrbə]), and a porridge-style dish (kaša, pronounced [ˈkəʃə]). Soups are usually served as the first course of lunch at midday:

- Kokošija supa (chicken broth)
- Goveđa/juneća/teleća supa (beef/calf broth)
- Jagnjeća supa (lamb broth)

Traditionally, after the broth is made, a handful of rice is added to the pot to make the soup more substantial. Nowadays, pasta has taken over as the preferred addition.

- Čorba od koprive (nettle chowder)
- Čorba od koprive sa sirom (nettle chowder with cheese)
- Čobanska krem supa od vrganja (shepherd cream soup with mushrooms (boletus))
- Otkos čorba (cut hay chowder)
- Čorba od crnjaka (black onion chowder)
- Ječmena kaša sa pečurkama (barley porridge with mushrooms)
- Kaša sa pečurkama (mushroom porridge)
- Kaša od rezanaca (noodle porridge)

=== Main course ===
- Kuvani brav (boiled lamb)
- Brav u mlijeku (lamb cooked in milk, a national dish of Albanians from Montenegro)
- Kačamak (polenta with buttered potato and kaymak, served with cold milk, buttermilk or yoghurt)
- Kuvana krtola (boiled potato halves, served with cold yoghurt, cheese or fresh cream)
- Ukljeva (smoked and dried bleak)
- Krap (smoked and fresh carp, from Lake Skadar)
- Pastrmka or pastrva (freshwater trout)
- Raštan (a slightly bitter, sturdy dark-green vegetable from the cabbage family, similar to Italian cavolo nero. It is cooked into a stew with smoked pork ribs or ham hocks)
- Zelje u kokote na kastradinu (cooked headed cabbage with smoked and dried mutton)
- Punjene paprike (dolma made with bell peppers)
- Čorbast pasulj (bean stew with smoked ribs and various types of salami and sausages. The style is similar to French cassoulet, fabada, and feijoada)
- Maune (green bean stew)
- Grašak (peas and beef stew)
- Balšića tava (fried veal with an assortment of vegetables and dairy products)
- Paštrovski makaruli (a type of homemade macaroni with olive oil and cheese from brine)

Seafood dishes include grilled or fried squid, octopus salad, black risotto (with cuttlefish), tuna, prawns, and mussels.

=== Salads ===
The most common salads served in Montenegrin homes:

- Pamidora salata (tomato salad) - similar to bruschetta toppings: tomato, onion, olive oil, and rock sea salt.
- Zelena salata (green salad) - spring lettuce and spring onion combination, with olive oil, salt, and vinegar dressing.
- Ajvar (fried or roasted capsicum relish)
- Kisjelo zelje (sauerkraut)

=== Dessert ===
A piece of seasonal fruit is the most common way to end the meal. The proper sweets are usually served on their own, around tea time or at any time coffee is served.

- Priganice (fritters or flat doughnuts) served with honey, cheese, or jam.
- Sundried figs with walnuts and honey.
- Sutlijaš (rice pudding)
- Slatko od dunja (quince relish)
- Džem od šljiva (plum jam)
- Sok od šipka (pomegranate syrup): homemade syrup made from wild pomegranates, that grow just about everywhere in the southern half of Montenegro, can be found in almost every home.
- Jello - typically white and sticky in its consistency

=== Dairy products ===
- Kisjelo mlijeko - buttermilk
- Jogurt - yoghurt
- Pavlaka - homemade sour cream
- Maslac - butter

==== Cheese ====
- Njeguški sir - special cheese, kept in oil.
- Pljevaljski sir - salted aged cheese made of cow's milk.
- Skorup - salted cottage cream
- Cijeli sir - whole cheese, made from unboiled milk.
- Prljo - cheese made from skimmed milk.
- Žetica - cheese made from unboiled milk.
- Buča - another kind of cheese made from unboiled milk.

=== Pita ===
- Sukača (gužvara) - a pastry or pie made through the process of "crowding".
- Koturača (wheel-like) (exclusively made from domestic wheat)
- Pita izljevuša (brkanica) - a pastry made by the process of "casting".
- Zeljanica (a pastry made with green herbs)
- Heljdija

== Other dishes ==
=== Breakfast ===
- Burek - the most popular fast food in the country.

=== Main course ===
- Punjene paprike - stuffed peppers (with various filling)
- Ćufte - meatballs
- Đuveč (cooked vegetables, similar to ratatouille)
- Musaka od krtola (potato moussaka with minced meat)
- Sarma - sauerkraut rolls filled with minced pork and rice, served with mashed potato.
- Pilav
- Gulaš (stew), served with mashed potato.
- Sataraš (minced and roasted vegetables)
- Risotto
- Roasted meat - most commonly pork or lamb.

=== Dessert ===
- Padobranci
- Baklava - Montenegrin version often has raisins and finely chopped walnuts.
- Tulumba, same as a churro in shape, soaked in sweet syrup like baklava.
- Krempita, similar to a vanilla slice
- Šampita
- Domaća torta - homemade torte
- Španski vjetar
- Čupava kata
- Lenja pita
- Keks torta (biscuit torte)
- Štrudla - Apple strudel
- Palačinke - crêpe
- Krofne (doughnuts) - served with jam in the middle.

=== Grill-based dishes (roštilj) ===
Affordable fast food includes ćevapi, pljeskavica (served in a local form of hamburger), and ražnjići.

== Beverages ==
=== Non-alcoholic ===
The most common non-alcoholic drink in Montenegrin homes is pomegranate syrup. Turkish coffee is also almost unavoidable in any but the briefest meeting or visit.

- Kisjela voda (mineral water)
- Sok od drenjina i drenjinava voda (homemade cornelian cherry juice and syrup)
- Turkish coffee
- Espresso
- Sok od šipka (pomegranate syrup)
- Sok od grožđa (grape syrup)
- Boza
- Mezgra (beech cream)

=== Alcoholic ===
Beer is brewed in the Trebjesa brewery. Wine is also made in the country, such as Vranac. Rakia and pelinkovac are traditional distilled drinks from the Balkans.
