= Mille-feuille =

French pâtisserie

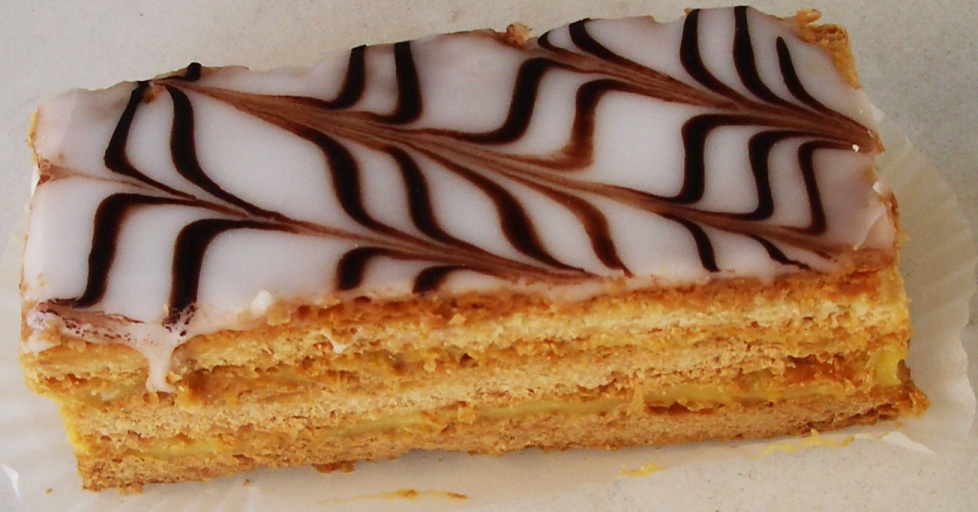
- A portion of a French mille-feuille
- Alternative names: gâteau de mille-feuilles, vanilla slice or custard slice, Napoleon, Napoleon pastry
- Type: Pastry, cake
- Course: Dessert
- Place of origin: France
- Main ingredients: Puff pastry, custard, powdered sugar
- Variations: Frangipane, whipped cream

A mille-feuille (French: [mil fœj]; lit. 'thousand-sheets'), (Note: The name is also written as millefeuille and mille feuille.) also known as Napoleon in Russia and other post-Soviet states, as well as in North America, vanilla slice and custard slice in the United Kingdom, as well as Australia and New Zealand, is a French dessert made of puff pastry layered with pastry cream. Its modern form was influenced by improvements made by Marie-Antoine Carême.

Traditionally, a mille-feuille is made up of three layers of puff pastry (pâte feuilletée), alternating with two layers of pastry cream (crème pâtissière). The top pastry layer is finished in various ways: sometimes it is topped with whipped cream, or it may be dusted with icing sugar, cocoa, pastry crumbs, or sliced almonds. It may also be glazed with icing or fondant alone, or in alternating white (icing) and brown (chocolate) or other colored icing stripes, and combed to create a marbled effect.

== History ==
According to the Oxford Companion to Sugar and Sweets, mille-feuille recipes from 17th century French and 18th century English cookbooks are a precursor to layer cakes.

The earliest mention of the name mille-feuille itself appears in 1733 in an English-language cookbook written by French chef Vincent La Chapelle. The 18th century mille-feuille was served stuffed with jam and marmalade instead of cream.

In French, the first mention of the mille-feuille appears a little later, in 1749, in a cookbook by Menon:

To make a mille-feuille cake, you take puff pastry, make out of it five cakes of equal size, & of the thickness of two coins, in the last one you shall make a hole in the middle in the shape of a Knight's cross, regarding the size you will base yourself on the dish that you will use for service, bake them in the oven. When they are baked & cooled, stack them one on the other, the one with the hole on top, & jams between every cake, [sentence unclear, maybe referring to covering all sides with jam] & ice them everywhere with white icing so that they appear to be a single piece; you can embellish it with some red currant jelly, candied lemon skins & pistachio, you serve them on a plate.

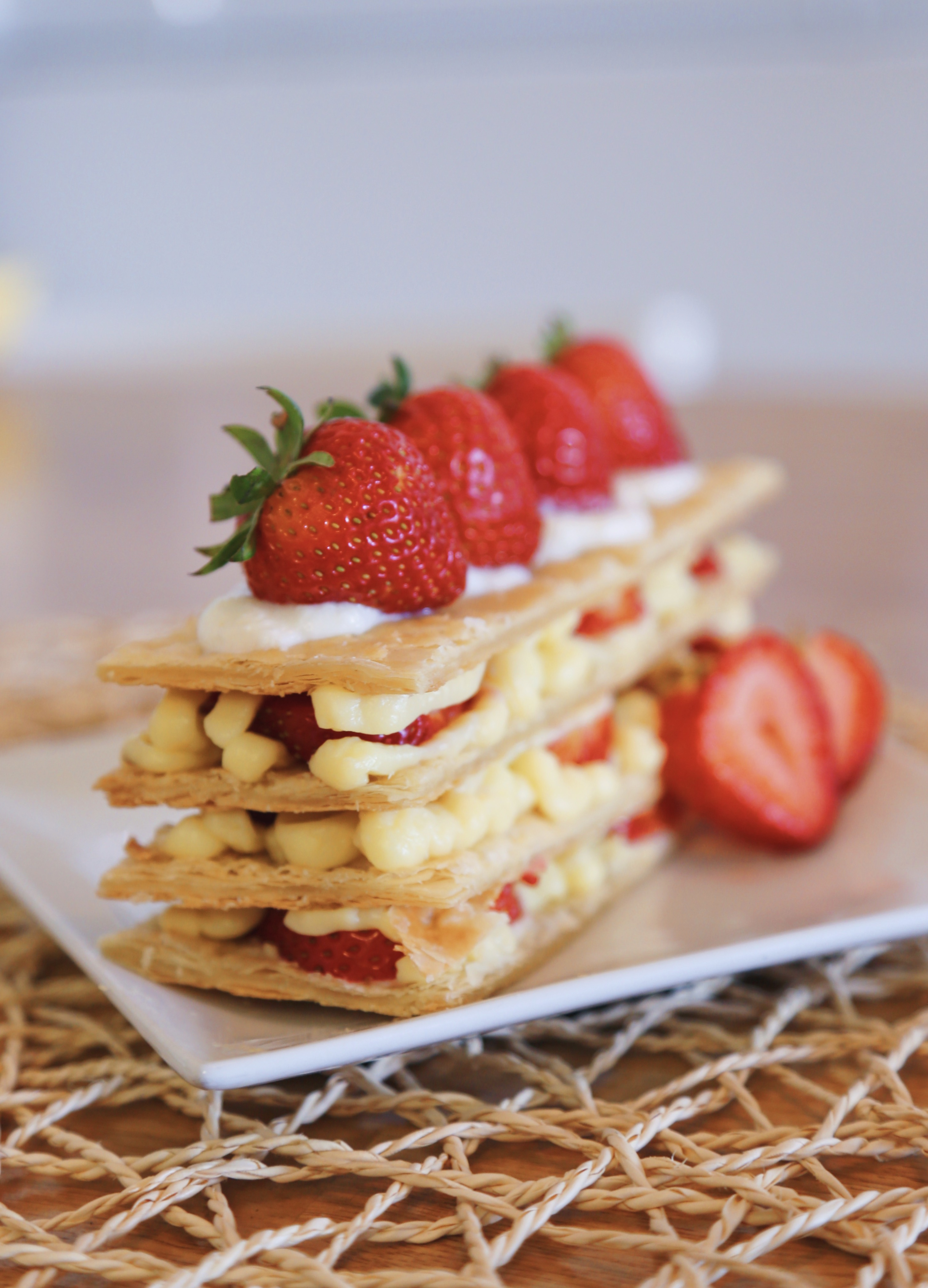
Homemade mille-feuille with fresh strawberries

The word 'mille-feuille' is not used again in the recipe books of the 18th century. However, under the reign of Napoleon Bonaparte, several of the fanciest Parisian pastry shops appear to have sold the cake. During the 19th century, all recipes described the cake as filled with jam, with the exception of the 1876 recipe by Urbain Dubois, where it was served with Bavarian cream.

According to Alan Davidson in the Oxford Companion to Food, the invention of the form (but not of the pastry itself) is usually attributed to Szeged, Hungary, where a caramel-coated mille-feuille is called 'Szegediner Torte'.

== Composition ==
Traditionally, a mille-feuille is made up of three layers of puff pastry and two layers of crème pâtissière. The top layer is coated with a sprinkling of powdered sugar. In later variations, the top is glazed with icing, in alternating white (icing) and brown (chocolate) strips, and then combed.

It is often layered with fruits, most commonly strawberry and raspberry.

== Variations ==
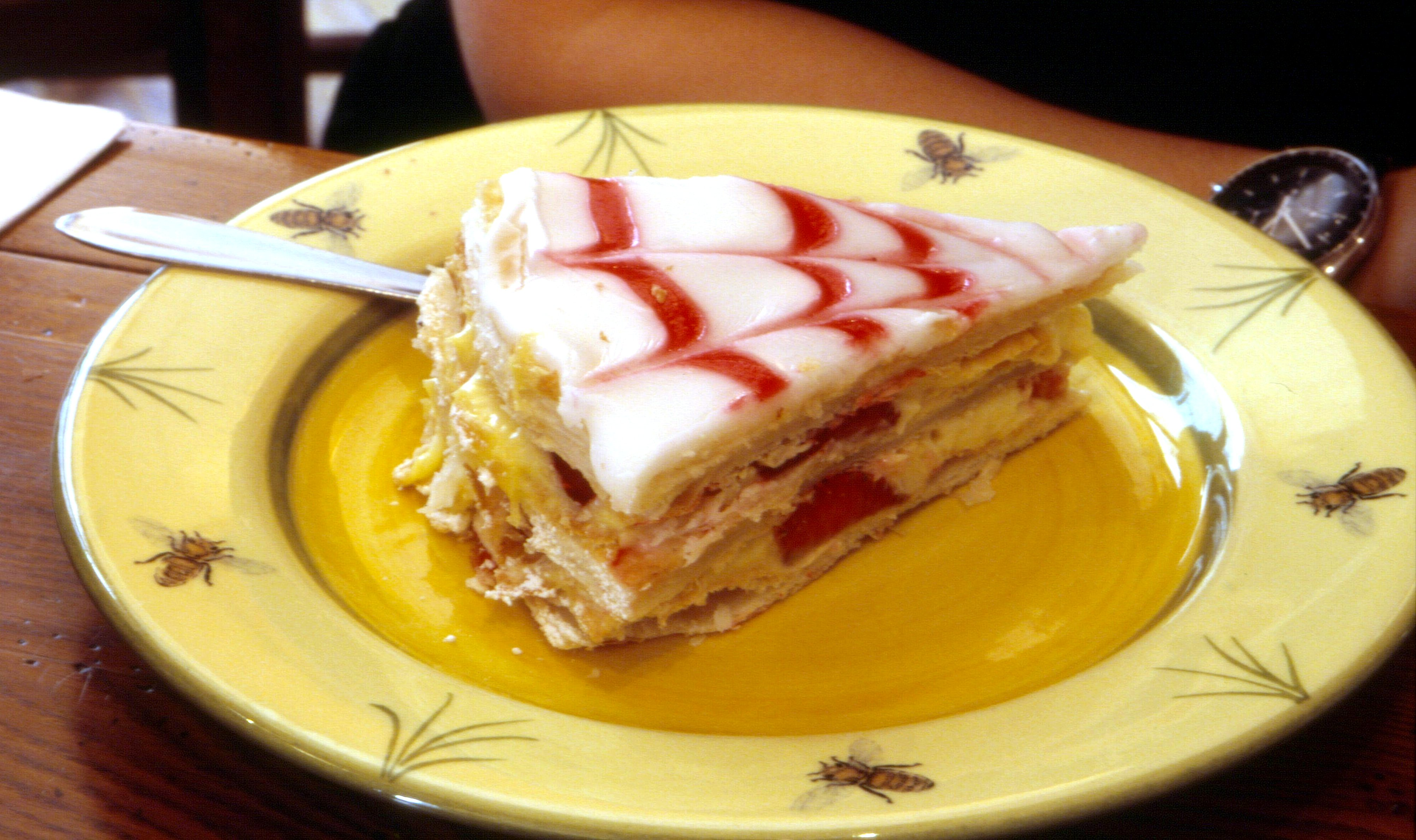
A mille-feuille pastry with comb icing

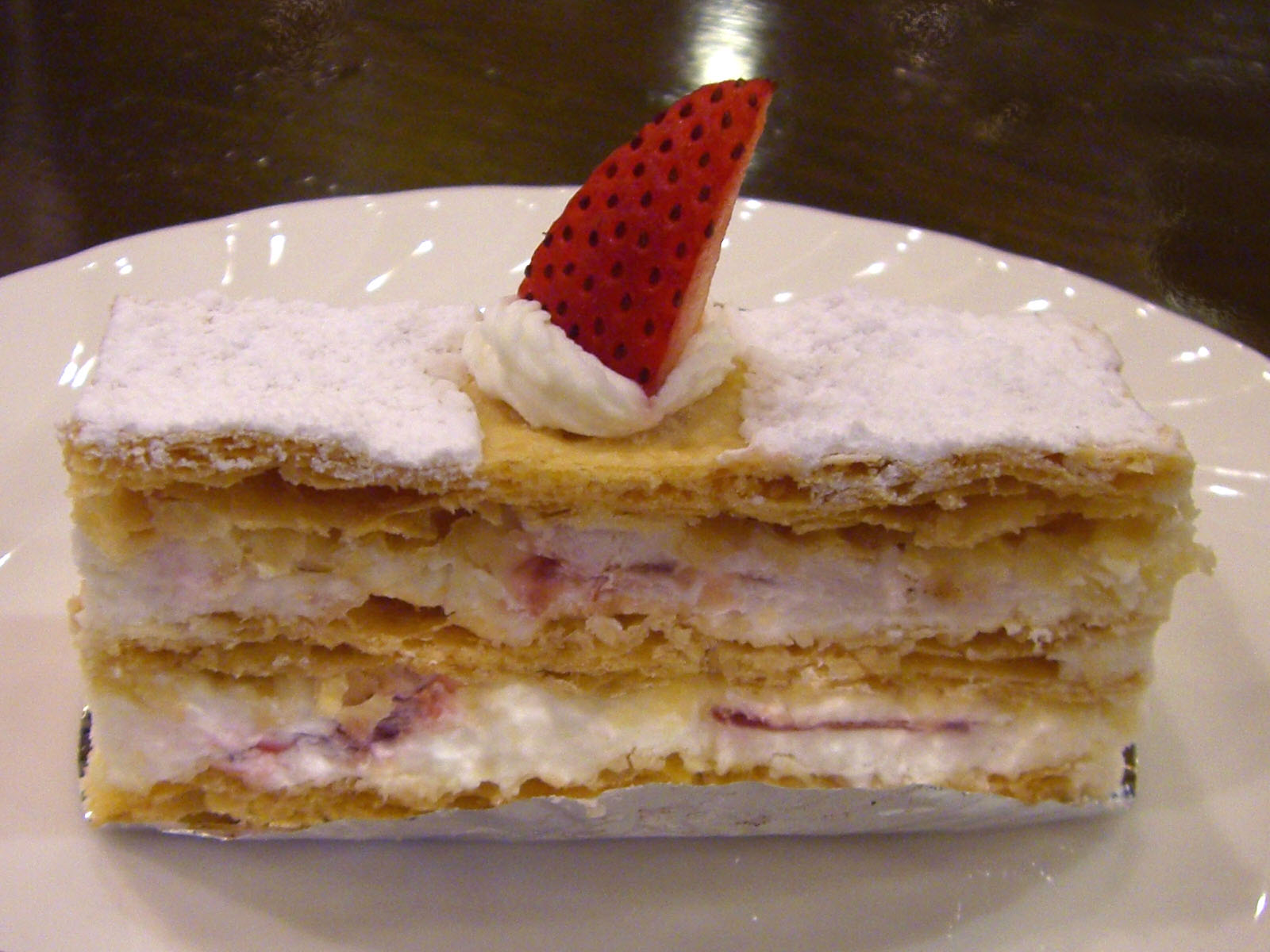
A mille-feuille pastry (Japan)

According to La Varenne, it was earlier called gâteau de mille-feuilles (lit. 'cake of a thousand sheets'), referring to the many layers of pastry. Using traditional puff pastry, made with six folds of three layers, it has 729 layers; with some modern recipes it may have as many as 2,048.

In France, the pastry called Napoleon is made with two joined layers of pâte feuilletée (puff pastry) filled with frangipane.

=== Armenia ===
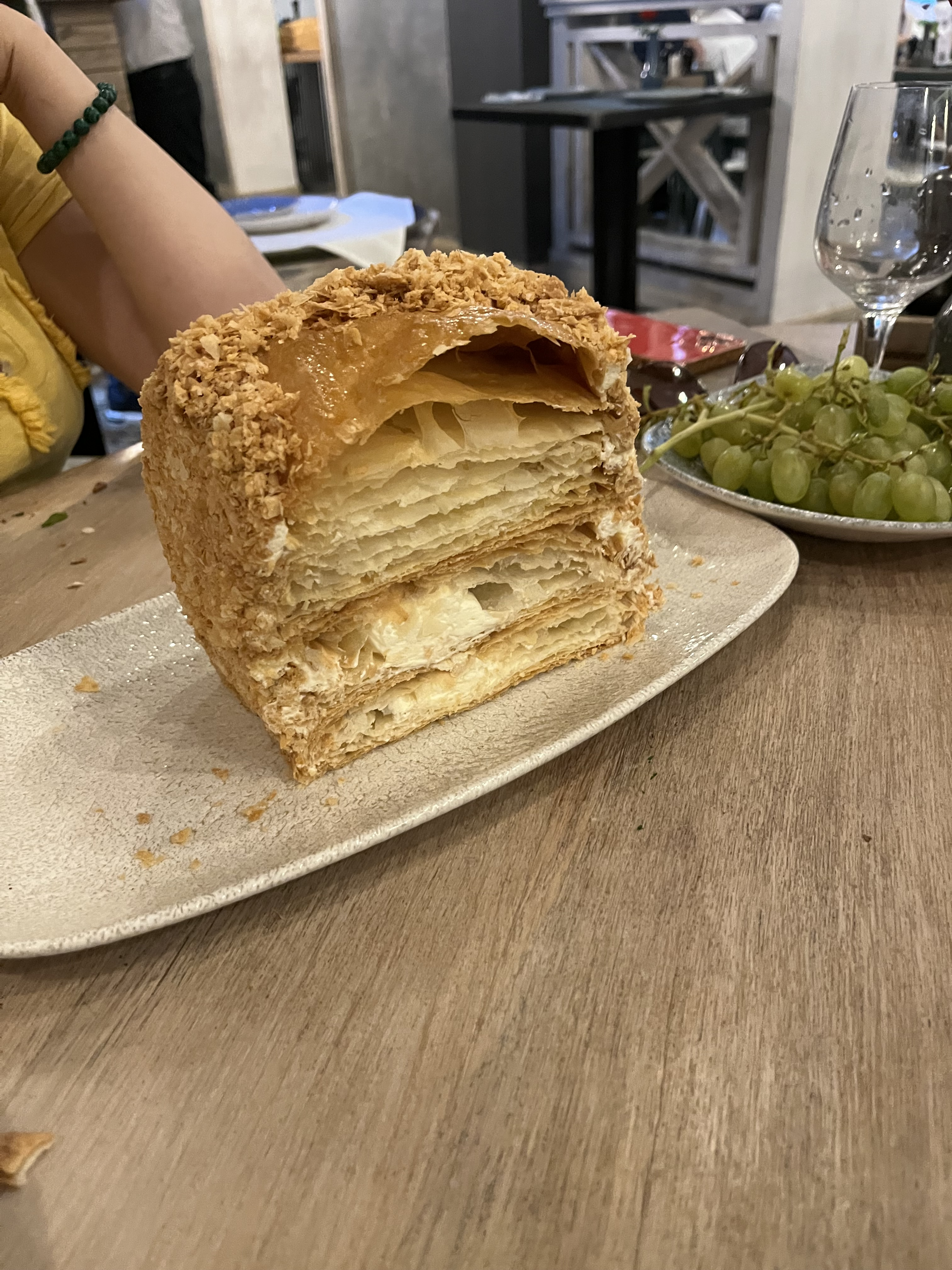
Armenian napoleon cake in a restaurant

In Armenia and therefore Armenian cuisine, mille feuille is known as "Napoleon" (Armenian: նապոլեոն) and is made from multiple thin layers of baked pastry dough, typically made with flour, butter, eggs, and sour cream. The layers are filled with a custard cream made of milk, sugar, eggs, and butter, sometimes combined with sweetened condensed milk. The cake is assembled by stacking the layers with cream, covering the surface, and finishing with crushed pastry crumbs. While walnuts, hazelnuts, raspberries, or sometimes Armenian brandy are also added to the cake in some variations.

=== Argentina and Uruguay ===
Rogel, a popular cake, the Argentine variant of the French pastry mille-feuille, consists of various layers of puff pastry alternating with layers of dulce de leche and a top glazed with meringue. Rogel is considered a classic, and a wedding cake favourite.

=== Australia and New Zealand ===
In Australia, a variant of the mille-feuille is the custard slice or vanilla slice. It is made using a gelatin-set crème pâtissière, and sometimes passionfruit icing. "French Vanilla slice" refers to a similar product without fondant icing, sometimes just dusted with powdered sugar. In parts of Victoria, these various versions are all referred to affectionately as "snot block" due to the pale yellow colour of the custard filling. In New Zealand, it is variously known as a custard slice, a custard square, a vanilla slice, or, with passion-fruit icing, a passion-fruit slice.

=== Balkan countries ===
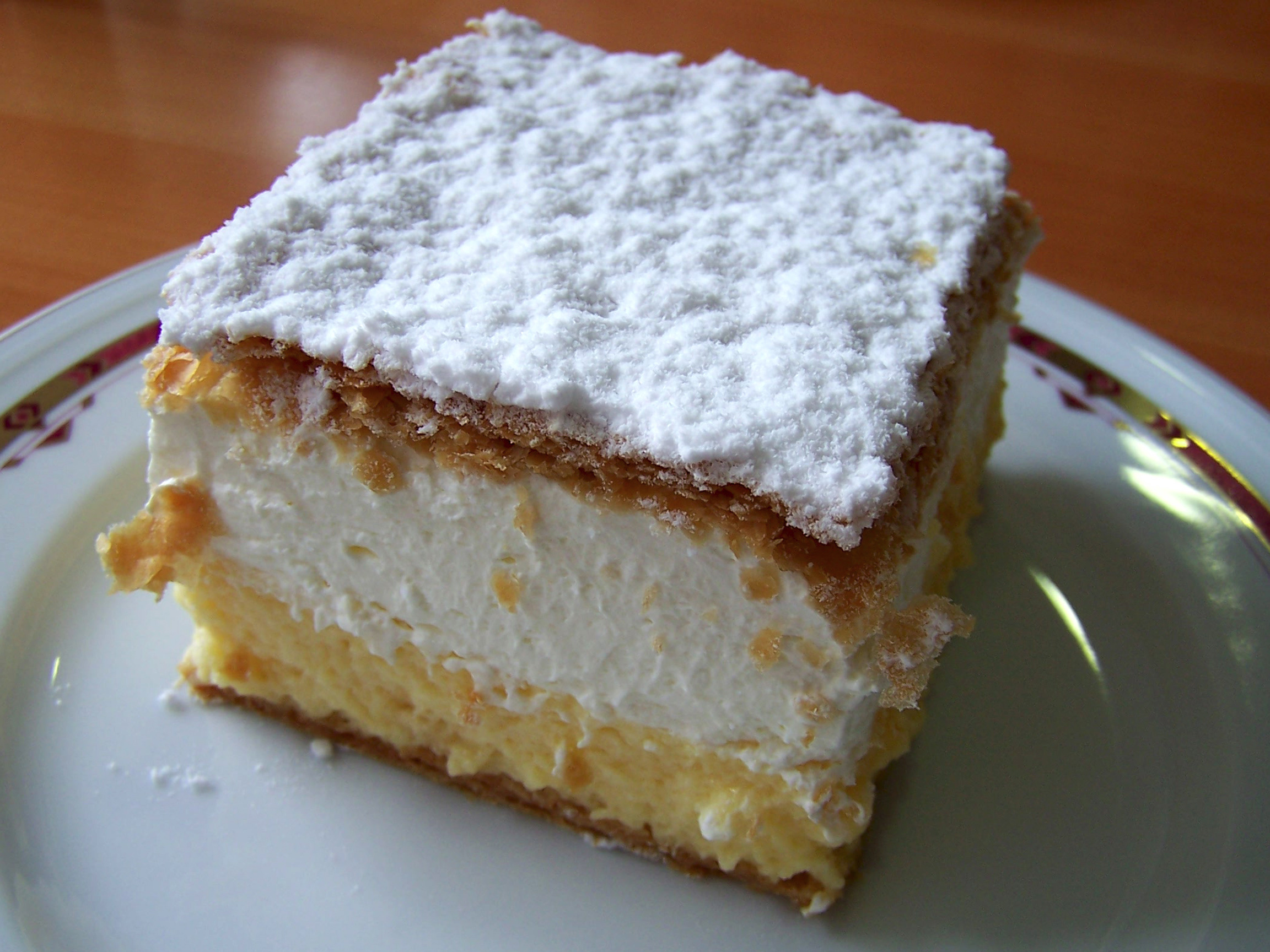
Kremna rezina

A similar local variety is called krempita in Serbia and Bosnia and Herzegovina, kremna rezina or kremšnita in Slovenia and Croatia, krémeš in Slovakia, and cremșnit in Romania.

=== Belgium and the Netherlands ===
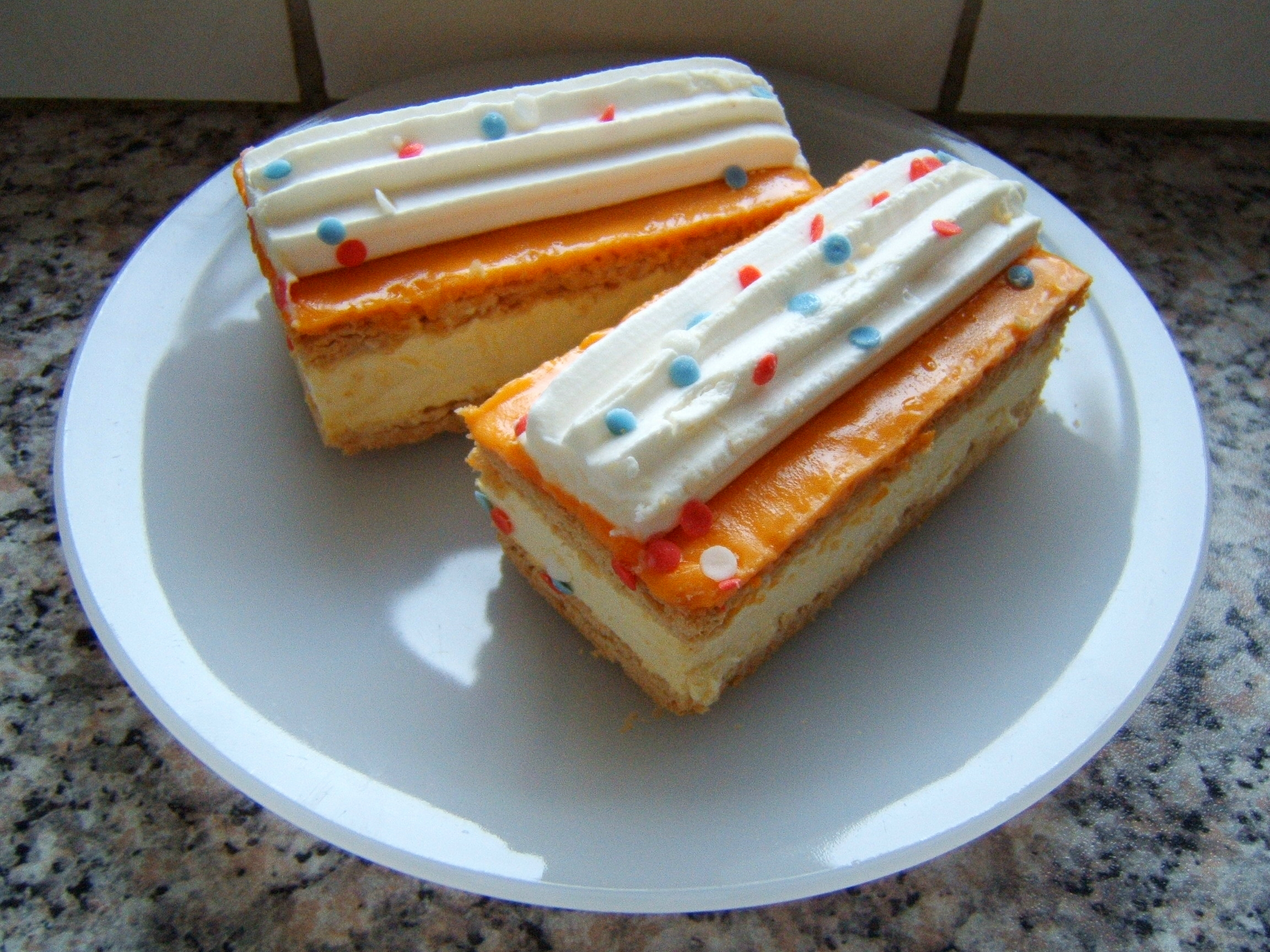
Tompouce on the King's Day in the Netherlands

In Belgium and the Netherlands, the tompouce or tompoes is the equivalent pastry. Several variations exist in Belgium, but in the Netherlands it has achieved an almost iconic status, with very little variation seen in form, size, ingredients and colour (always two layers of pastry, nearly always pink glazing, but orange around national festivities). The cartoon character Tom Puss by Marten Toonder is named after the tompouce.

=== Canada ===
In Canada, mille-feuille is often named gâteau Napoléon among French speakers, and "Napoleon slice" in English-speaking Canada. It is sold with either custard, whipped cream, or both between three layers of puff pastry; almond paste is the most common filling. A French Canadian method of making a mille-feuille uses graham crackers instead of puff pastry, with pudding replacing the custard layer.

=== German varieties ===
In the German-speaking part of Switzerland and also in Austria, it is called Cremeschnitte. In Israel it is known by a variation of that name, kremshnit (קרמשניט).

=== Greece ===
In Greece, the pastry is called μιλφέιγ, a transcription of the word mille-feuille using the Greek alphabet. The filling between the layers is cream whereas whipped cream (a vanilla-infused French Chantilly) is used at the top of the pastry.

=== Hong Kong ===
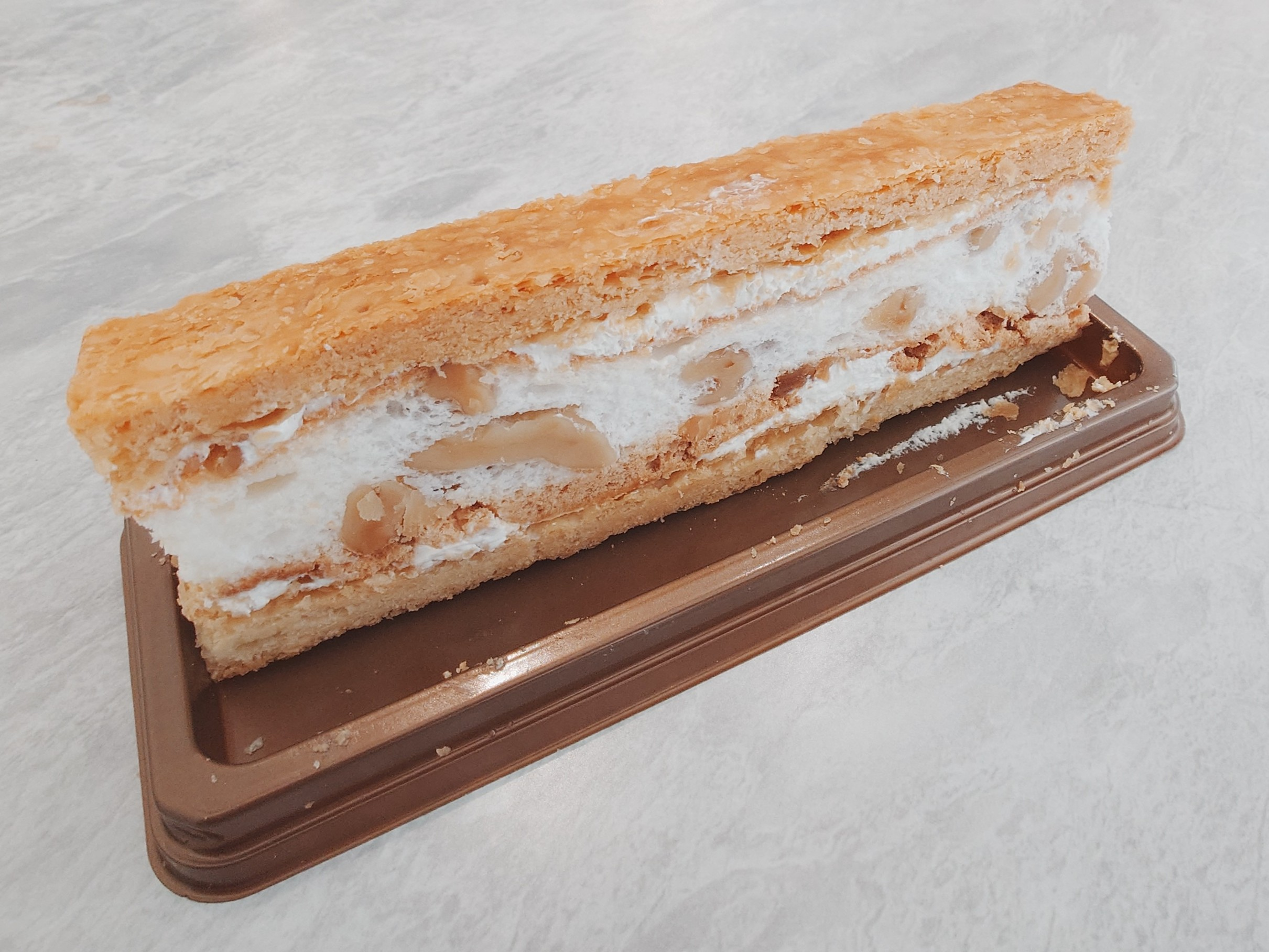
Hong Kong–style Napoleon pastry

In Hong Kong, the 拿破侖 (naa4 po3 leon4, "Napoleon") is layered with buttercream, meringue and walnuts. In Mainland China, a similar product also marketed as a Napoleon (拿破侖; Nápòlún, or more commonly, 法式千層酥) varies between regions and individual bakeries, but usually features a top and bottom layer of rough puff pastry, typically made with vegetable shortening rather than butter, and a sponge cake and artificial buttercream filling.

=== Hungary ===
In Hungary, it is called krémes. One version, the francia krémes (French Napoleon), is topped with whipped cream and caramel fondant.

=== Italy ===
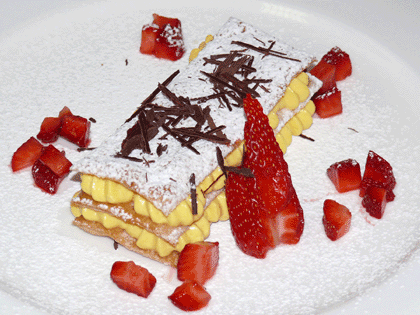
Italian mille foglie filled with pastry cream and garnished with strawberries, shaved chocolate and powdered sugar

In Italy, the mille-feuille is known as the mille foglie and contains similar fillings and come sometimes includes a layer of sponge cake as well (e.g. from bottom to top, puff pastry, sponge cake, strawberries and cream and then puff pastry).

=== Iran ===
In Iran, the pastry is called شيرينى ناپلئونى (Shirini-ye Nâpeloni, literally "Napoleonic sweet pastry"). It consists of thin puff pastry, rose water, pistachios and whipped saffron cream which is often topped with powdered sugar.

=== Japan ===
In Japan both the terms “mille-feuille” and “Napoleon” are used, though they denote different versions of the dessert. The first is pronounced mirufīyu (ミルフィーユ), and usually features two or three layers of puff pastry filled with custard cream and sliced strawberries, and topped with a small amount of the same.

The more extravagant version is known as “Napoleon Pie” (ナポレオンパイ) and features three layers of puff pastry filled with whipped and custard cream with halved strawberries. It is topped with two rows of whole strawberries bordered with piped whipped cream. All four vertical sides are then completely covered with sliced almonds.

=== Lithuania ===
In Lithuanian tradition, Napoleon or Napoleonas. In Lithuanian recipe pastry has layers of fruit filling such as wild cranberries jam and crème pâtissière. Sometimes is associated with weddings or celebrations.

=== North Africa ===
In North Africa, mille-feuilles are consumed regularly in countries under French hegemony (French Algeria, French Protectorate in Morocco, French Protectorate of Tunisia,) and are known by their French name (ميلفي). In the northern cities of Morocco such as Tetouan, they are also called by their Spanish name, Milhojas.

=== Philippines ===
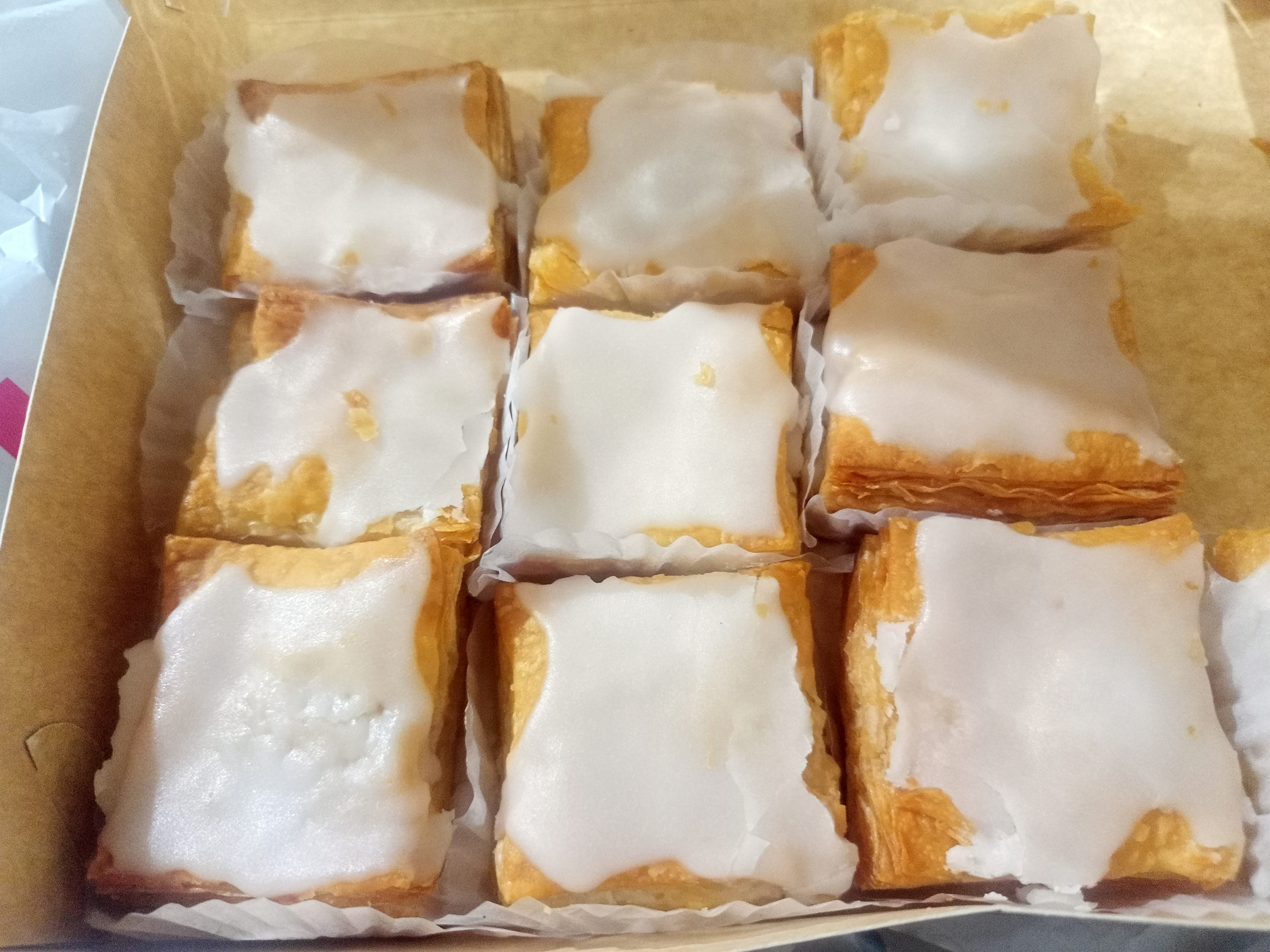
Bacolod's Napoleones

In the Philippines, they are called napoleones (/næpɒˈljoʊnɛs/ na-pol-YOH-nes, Tagalog pronunciation: [na.polˈjɔ.nɛs]; napoleón in the singular), and are made of two to three layers, with pastry cream or white custard as filling, topped with sugar glaze. It is a popular specialty on Negros Island especially in Silay City and Bacolod City, and can be bought as pasalubong by many who visit the island.

=== Poland ===
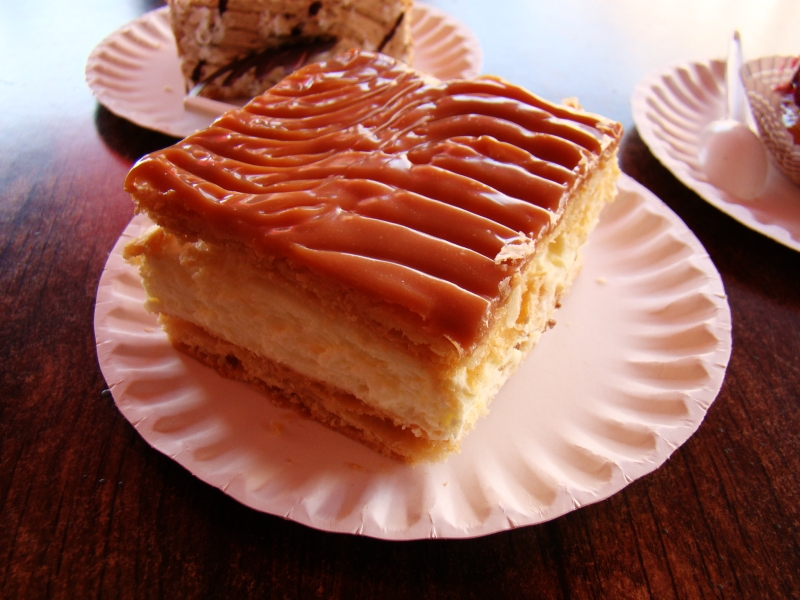
Polish Napoleonka

In Poland, the local variant of the pastry is officially called napoleonka, and less commonly kremówka. It consists of two layers of pastry separated by a thick cream layer. The whole pastry is then covered with powdered sugar.

=== Portugal ===
Similar to other European countries, in Portugal the French variation is known as mil-folhas (a direct translation of the French) in the Lisbon region, and as napoleão (a transliteration of Napoleon's name) in the centre and north of Portugal. Conversely, in the north, the Russian variant is known as mil-folhas, which in the Lisbon region is usually called russo (with the meaning of 'Russian') or possibly russo folhado ('Russian pastry'). Both types are common across coffee shops, tea houses, and patisseries in Portugal; the French mille-feuille is even found on some supermarket chains, produced industrially and either individually packaged or as a set.

While the recipe for the Portuguese variant is very consistent with the original French one, both in look, flavour, and size, there are two additional alternatives. The first is just a bigger version of the mille-feuille, with additional layers and probably more cream, being commonly 5–7 cm in height. The second alternative (more common in the regular format) is to tint the white icing sugar with egg gems, thus making it yellow in appearance, but also with the traditional chocolate marble effect. Finally, some places can also offer under the same name a few minor changes, such as a glazed caramel top, slices of almonds, or replacing the puff cream with jam, chantilly cream, or even marmelada (quince cheese), although these are uncommon.

=== Russia ===
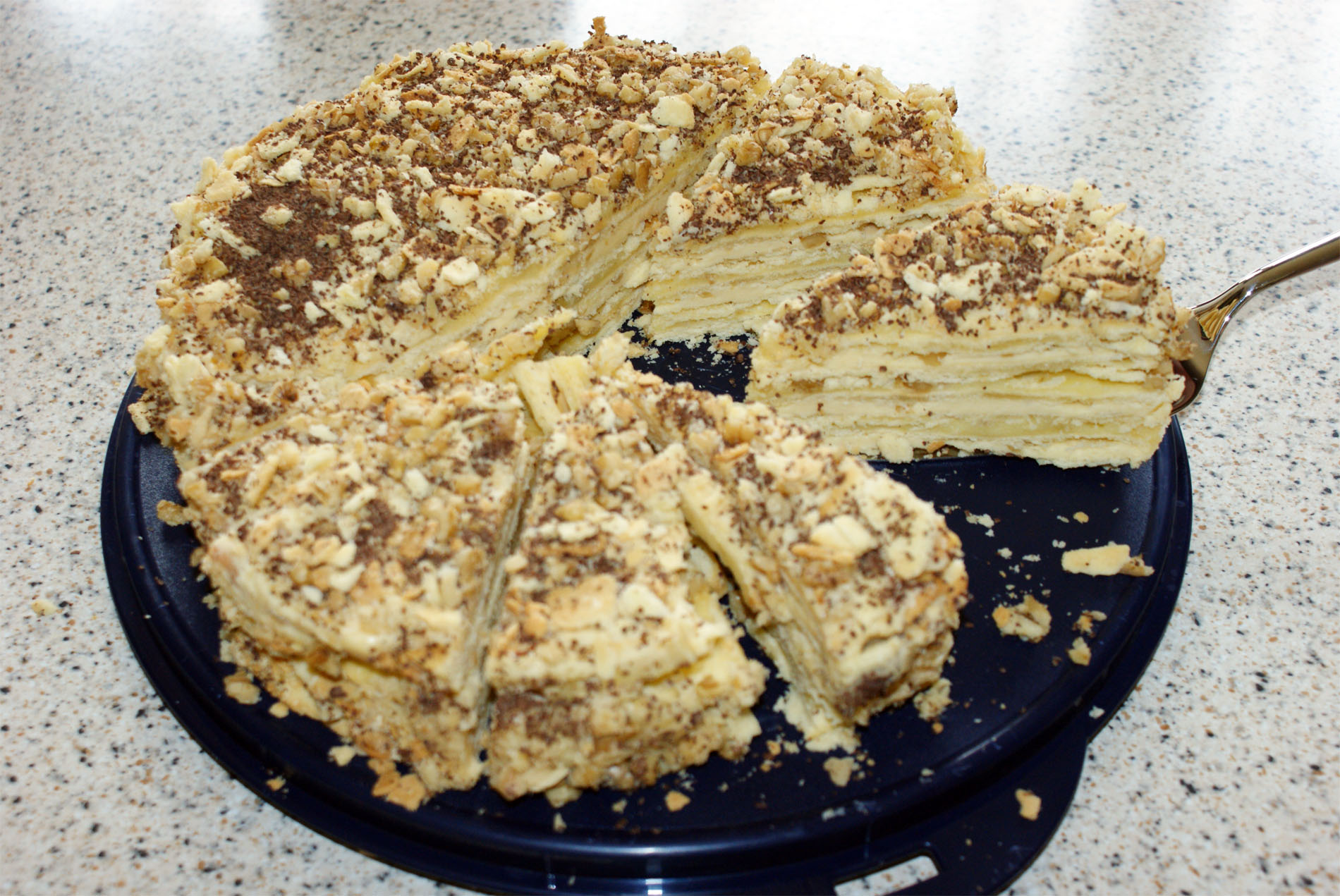
Russian Napoleon cake

In Russian literature, a cake named Napoleon (Russian: Наполеон) is first mentioned as early as in the first half of the 19th century. Alexander Bestuzhev explained the emergence of such names by the romantic and historicist spirit of that time. The cake has enjoyed an especially great popularity since the centenary celebration of the Russian victory over Napoleon in the Patriotic War of 1812. During the celebrations in 1912, triangular-shape pastries were sold resembling the bicorne. The many layers of the cake symbolized La Grande Armée. In fact, the Russian "Napoleon" is an old recipe that was revisited in 1925 by the pastry chef Adrien Artigarrède. He added almonds from Crimea and icing sugar on the top (symbolizing the snows of Russia, once so helpful to Russians in their defeat of Napoleon).

Later, the cake became a standard dessert in Soviet cuisine. Nowadays, the Napoleon remains one of the most popular cakes in Russia and other post-Soviet countries. It typically has more layers than the French archetype, but the same height.

In popular culture the mille-feuille is referenced as a special treat for Count Rastov in "A Gentleman in Moscow."

=== South Africa ===
In South Africa and Zimbabwe, it is called a 'custard slice'.

=== Spain ===
In the Spanish milhojas, the puff pastry is thin and crunchy. They are often far deeper than solely three layers of pastry and can reach up to 6 inches (15 cm) tall. In the north of Spain, milhojas are usually filled with creme patissiere and have three or four layers of puff pastry. In central Spain, milhojas usually have only two or three layers of puff pastry filled with very thick layers of whipped cream or Chantilly.

=== Nordic countries ===
In Sweden as well as in Finland, the Napoleonbakelse (Napoleon pastry) is a mille-feuille filled with whipped cream, custard, and jam. The top of the pastry is glazed with icing and currant jelly. In Denmark it is called napoleonskage and in Norway napoleonskake, both meaning "Napoleon cake".

=== United Kingdom ===
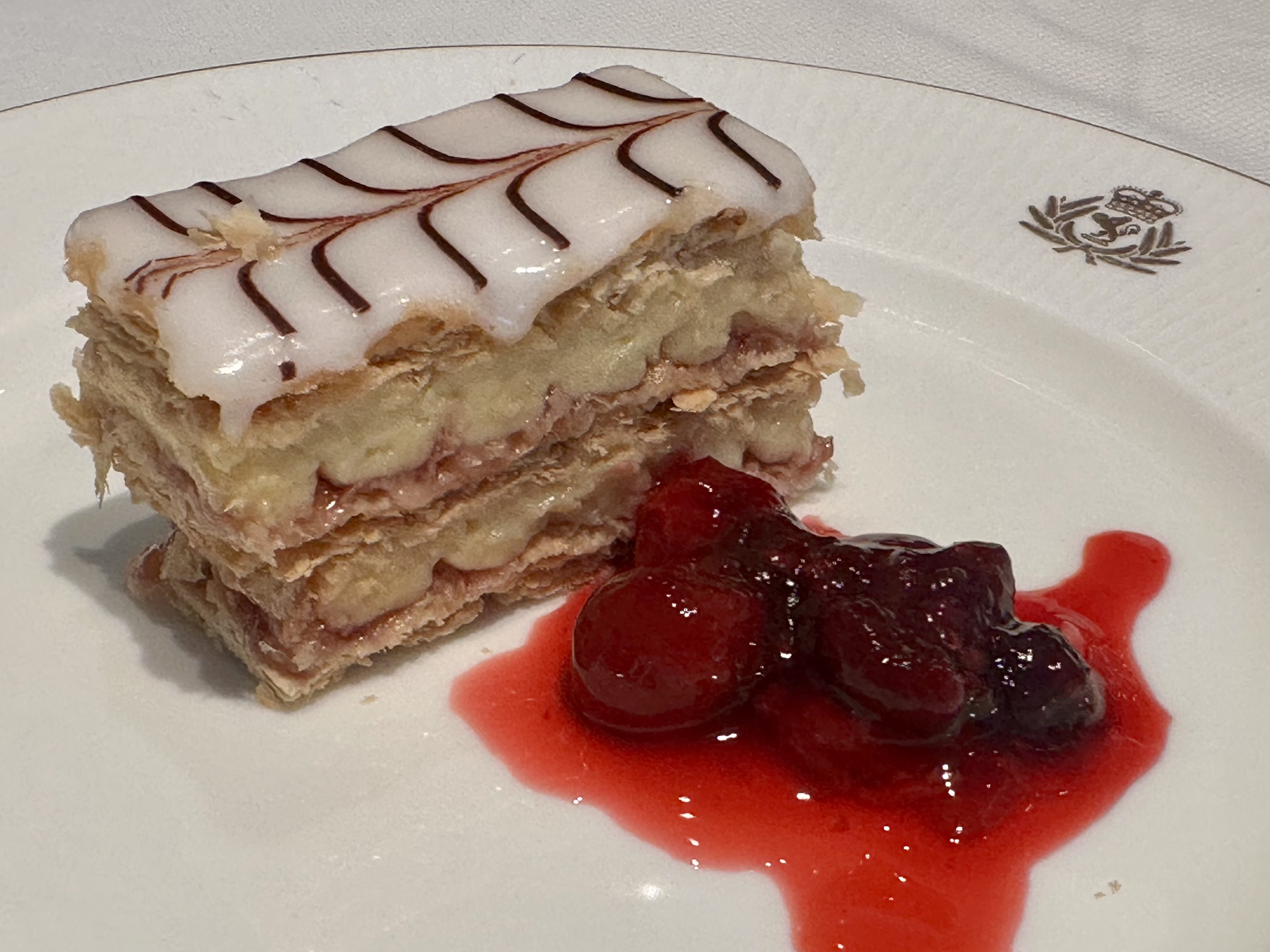
Vanilla Mille-Feuille with berries onboard the MS Queen Anne

In the United Kingdom, the pastry is most often called a vanilla slice, cream slice. However a custard slice which is often confused with only has a layer of pastry at the bottom and top (which is usually decorated with icing or fruit and icing sugar or all 3, but can, on occasion, be named mille-feuille or Napoleon on branded products. It is common in the UK to only use two slices of pastry with a single, thick layer of filling between them, and the filling may be pastry cream or sometimes whipped cream.

=== United States ===
In the United States, the pastry is most often called a Napoleon. It typically includes three layers of pastry, is filled with pastry cream, and is glazed with icing sugar in a feathered or marbled pattern.

== Other ==
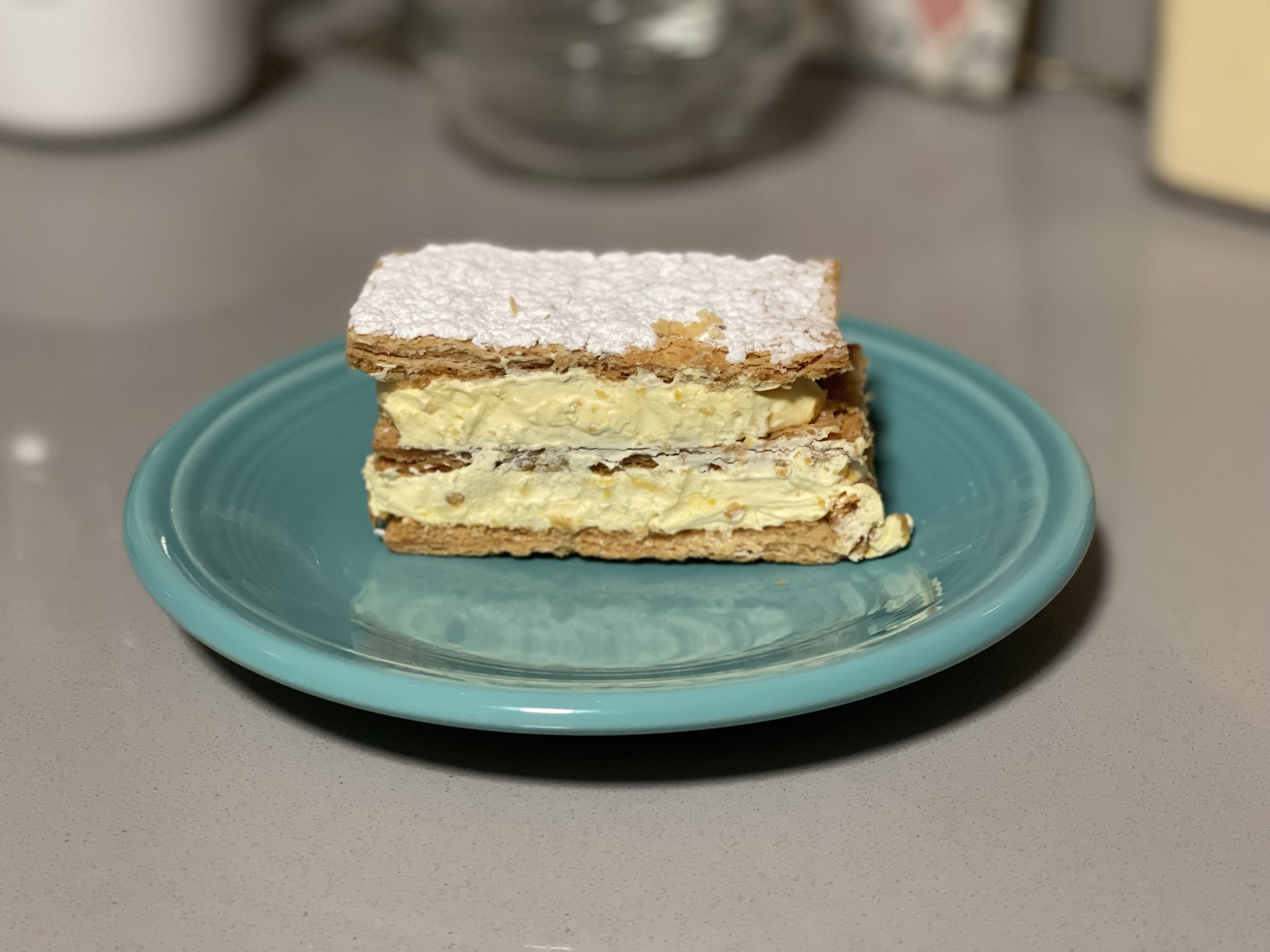
Latin-style Napoleon dessert made at a Mexican bakery in Sonoma, California

In Latin American milhojas, various layers of puff pastry are layered with confectioner's sugar on top. A Colombian version of milhoja has various layers of puff pastry and pastry cream. It is topped with arequipe (dulce de leche).

== See also ==
- List of custard desserts
- List of French desserts
