= Tompouce =

Type of pastry in the Netherlands and Belgium

Tompoes
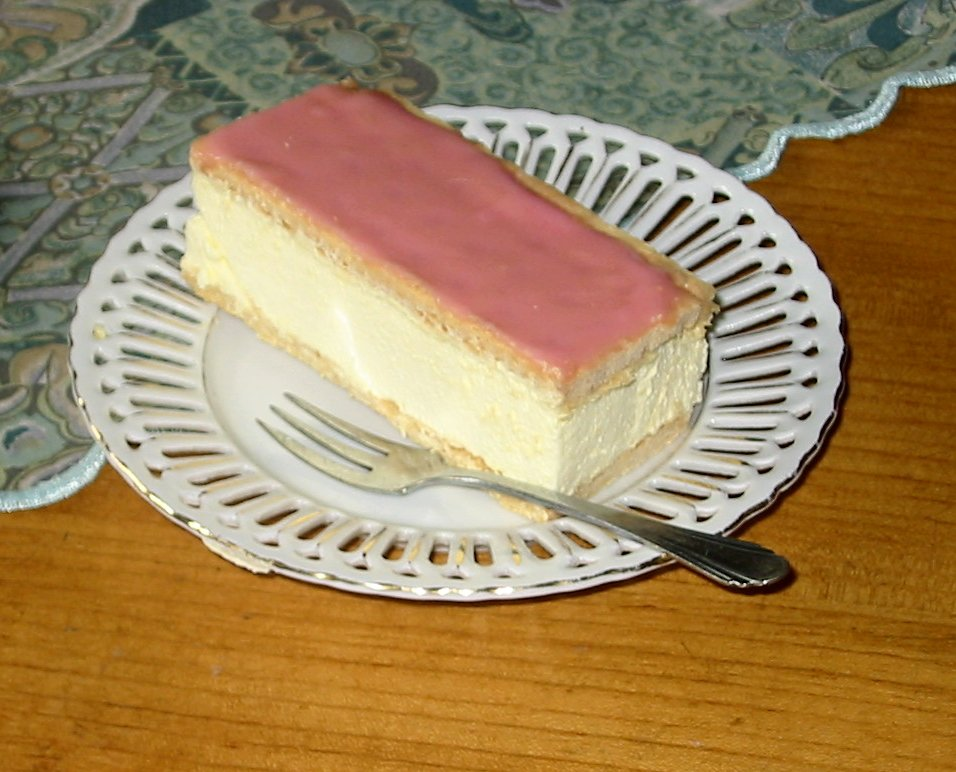
- Alternative names: Tompouce
- Type: Pastry
- Place of origin: Netherlands, Belgium
- Main ingredients: Puff pastry, icing, pastry cream

A tompoes or tompouce is a pastry in the Netherlands and Belgium. It closely resembles the Australian vanilla slice and German Cremeschnitte, and more distantly the mille-feuille, or Napoleon. It was introduced by an Amsterdam pastry baker and named after Admiral Tom Pouce, the stage name of the Frisian dwarf Jan Hannema. The name "Tom Pouce" is French for "Tom Thumb".

== Customs ==
In the Netherlands, the tompoes is iconic, and the market allows little variation in form, size, and colour. It must be rectangular, with two layers of puff pastry, similar to the cream slice in the United Kingdom. The icing is smooth and pink, or occasionally white. For many years, however, the top layer has been orange on Koningsdag (King's Day), and a few days before. It may also be orange-coloured when the national football team plays in large international tournaments; this dates from about 1990. The filling is invariably sweet, yellow pastry cream. Tompouces are sometimes topped with whipped cream. Variations with different fillings or with jam are comparatively rare and are not called tompoes.

Several variations exist in Belgium. White glazing on top is the norm in Belgium, sometimes with a chocolate pattern similar to mille-feuille. The boekske (lit. 'booklet') may have a sugar finish and may be square. Belgians also use the spelling tompouce or call them glacé (referring to the glazing).

== Eating the tompouce ==
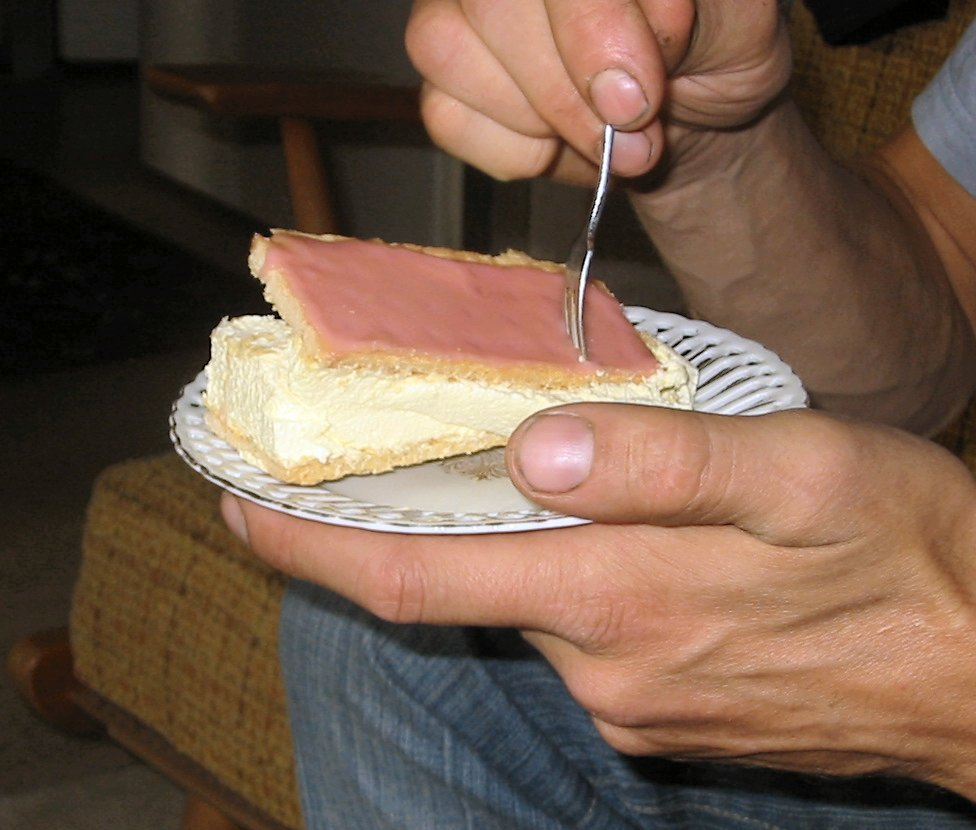
Tompouce is difficult to eat.

The cakes are usually served with tea, beer, or coffee, and in formal settings are eaten with pastry forks. But the hard biscuit-like layers, which squash the pastry cream when trying to cut a piece off, make this difficult and messy, inspiring the perennial question, "Hoe eet je een tompoes?" ('How do you eat a tompouce?').

== See also ==
- Cremeschnitte
- Crompouce
- Ice cream sandwich
- Mille-feuille
- Napoleonka (kremówka)
- List of custard desserts
- Vanilla slice
