= Njeguški pršut =

Dry-cured ham from Montenegro

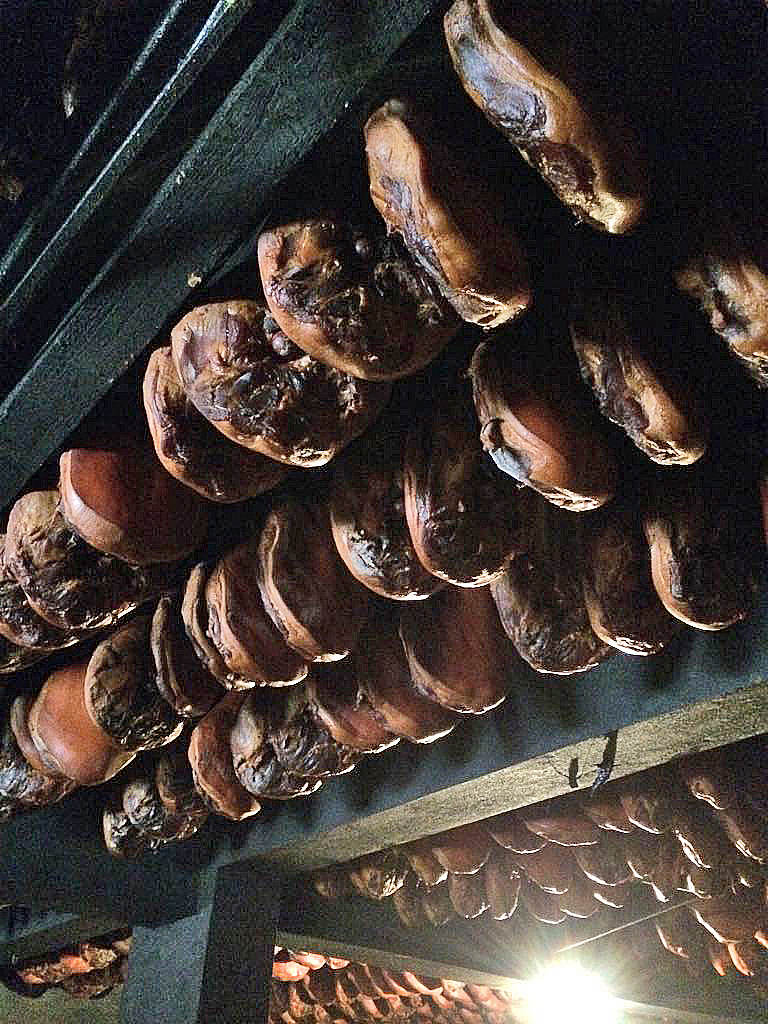
Njeguški pršut at the time of curing with smoke

Njeguški pršut (Serbian Cyrillic: Његушки пршут) is a specialty of Njeguši in Montenegro. Pršut is dry-cured ham, served uncooked, similar to Italian prosciutto crudo. Its particular flavour and aroma are, according to its producers, the result of the mixture of sea and mountain air and beech wood burned during the drying process.

The curing process includes salting with sea salt for about three weeks, pressing to remove excess liquid for about three weeks, light smoking and drying in the cool mountain breeze for three months followed by maturing process. The whole cycle takes about a year.

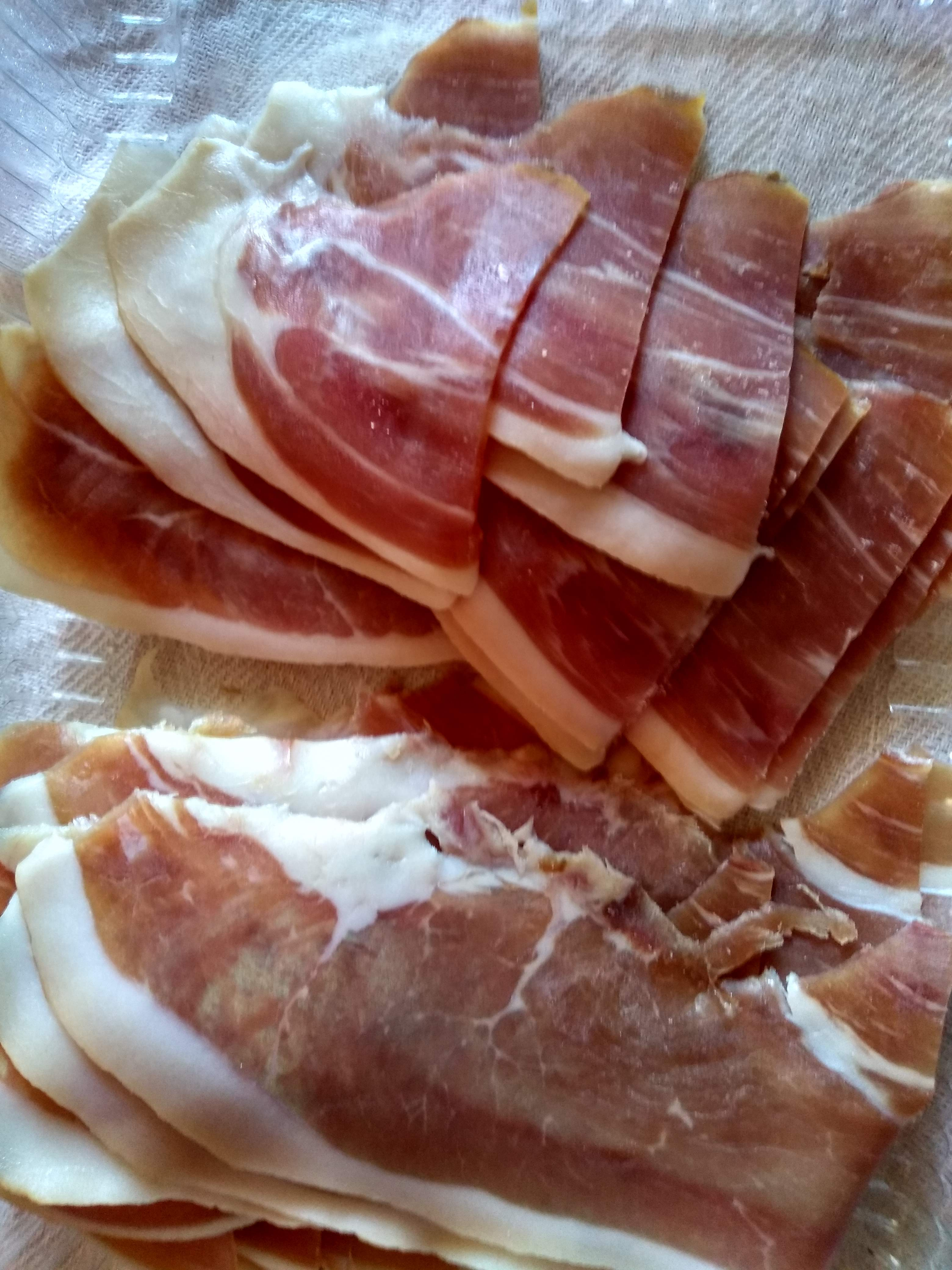
Sliced njeguški pršut

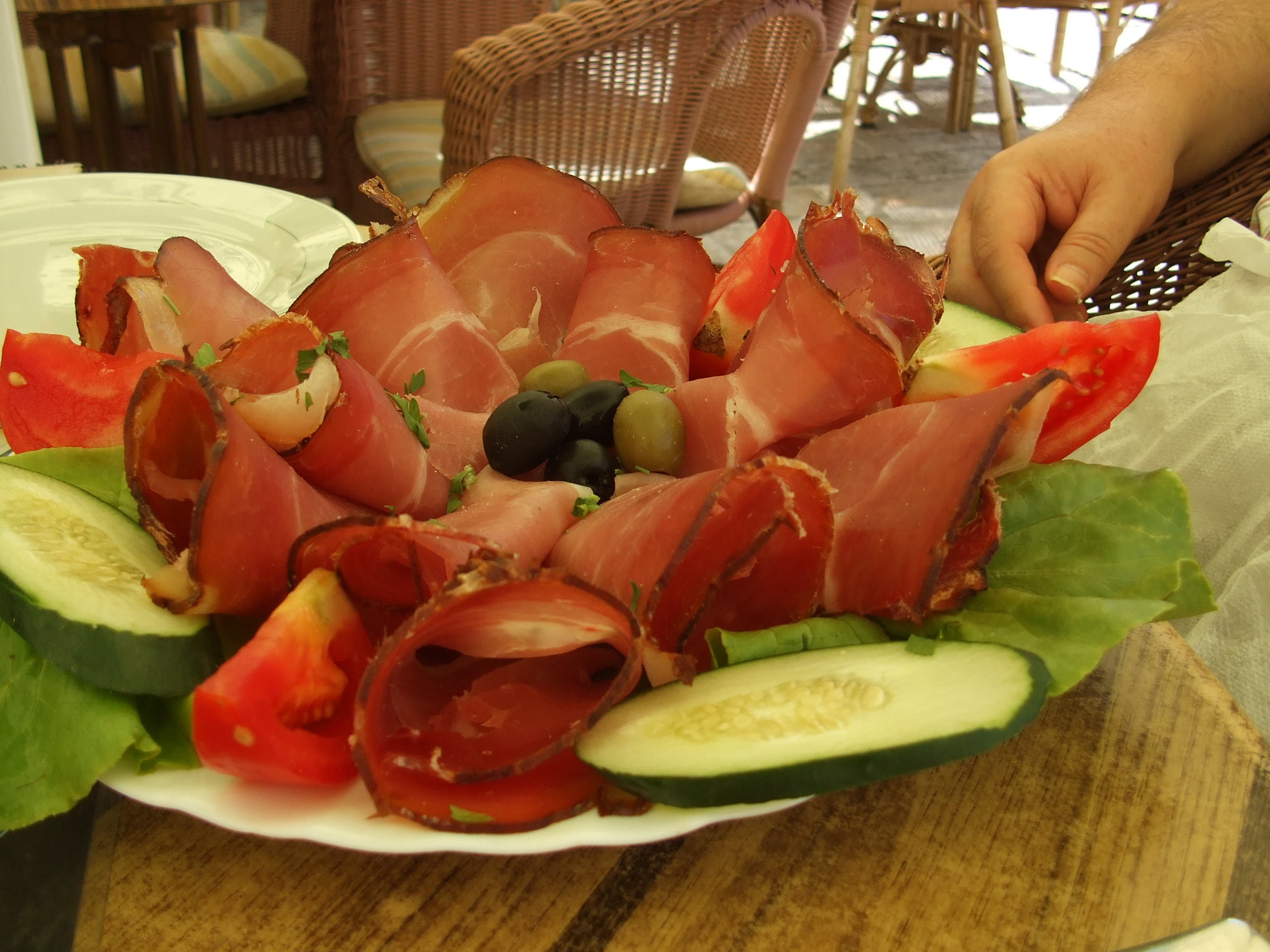
njeguški pršut served as an appetizer

== See also ==
- Cuisine of Montenegro
- List of hams
- List of dried foods
