= Milhojas =

Dessert made with layers of puff pastry

Milhoja
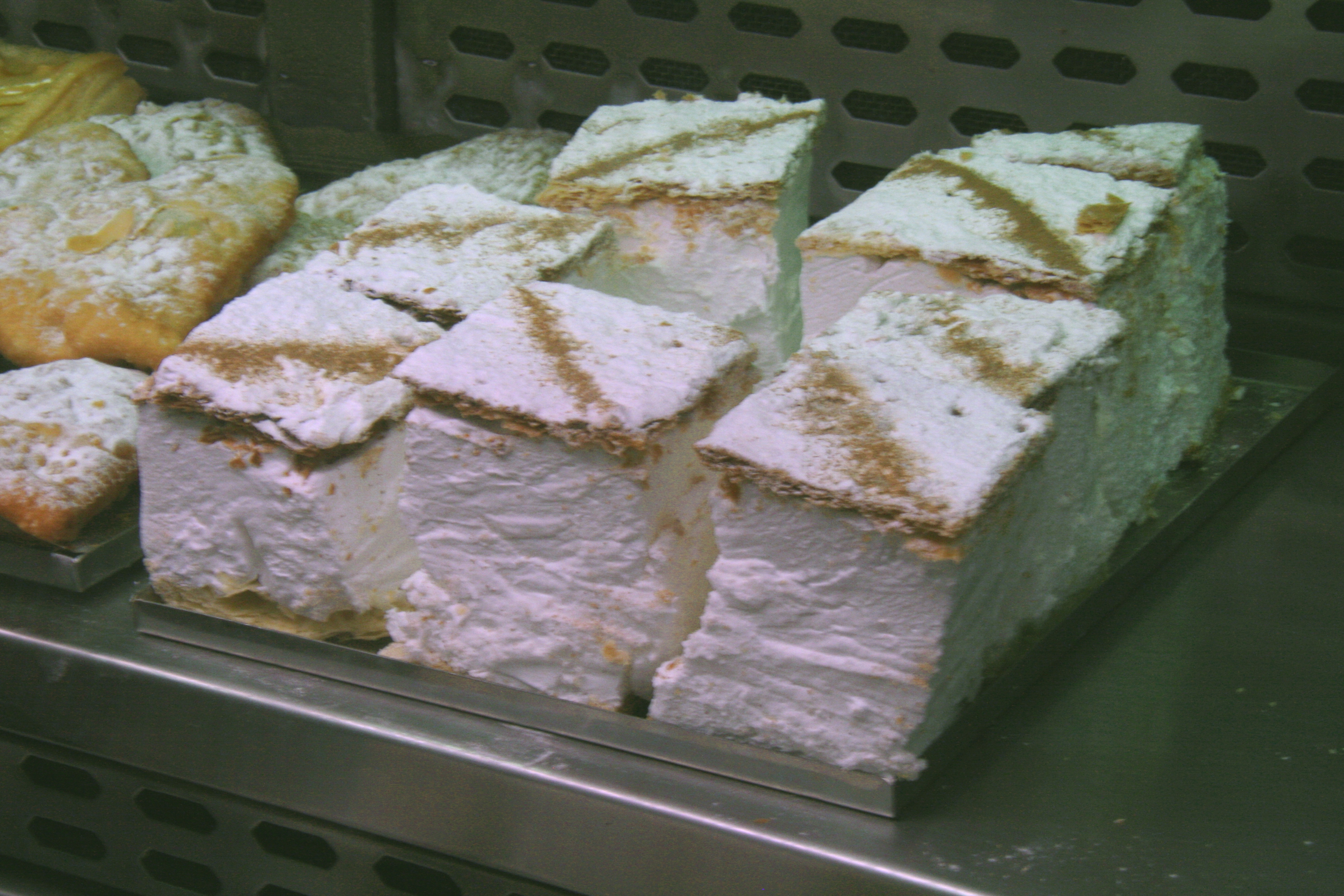
- Bakery with Milhojas
- Type: Dessert
- Place of origin: France
- Region or state: Europe, Americas
- Associated cuisine: Spain, Argentina, Ecuador, Colombia, Costa Rica, Chile, El Salvador, Guatemala, Mexico, Peru, Portugal, France, Uruguay, Venezuela
- Main ingredients: Layers of puff pastry

Milhojas ("thousand sheets") is a type of dessert of French origin that is found nowadays in Spain and Latin America. It is the local name for mille-feuille in Spanish-speaking countries.

They are made with stacked layers of puff pastry, often filled with meringue, and other times with creme patissiere; cream; dulce de leche; a creamy mix of condensed milk, sugar, and vanilla; or white chocolate and are part of the cuisines of Spain, Argentina, Bolivia, Ecuador, Colombia, Costa Rica, Chile, El Salvador, Guatemala, Mexico, Peru, Portugal, Uruguay, and Venezuela.

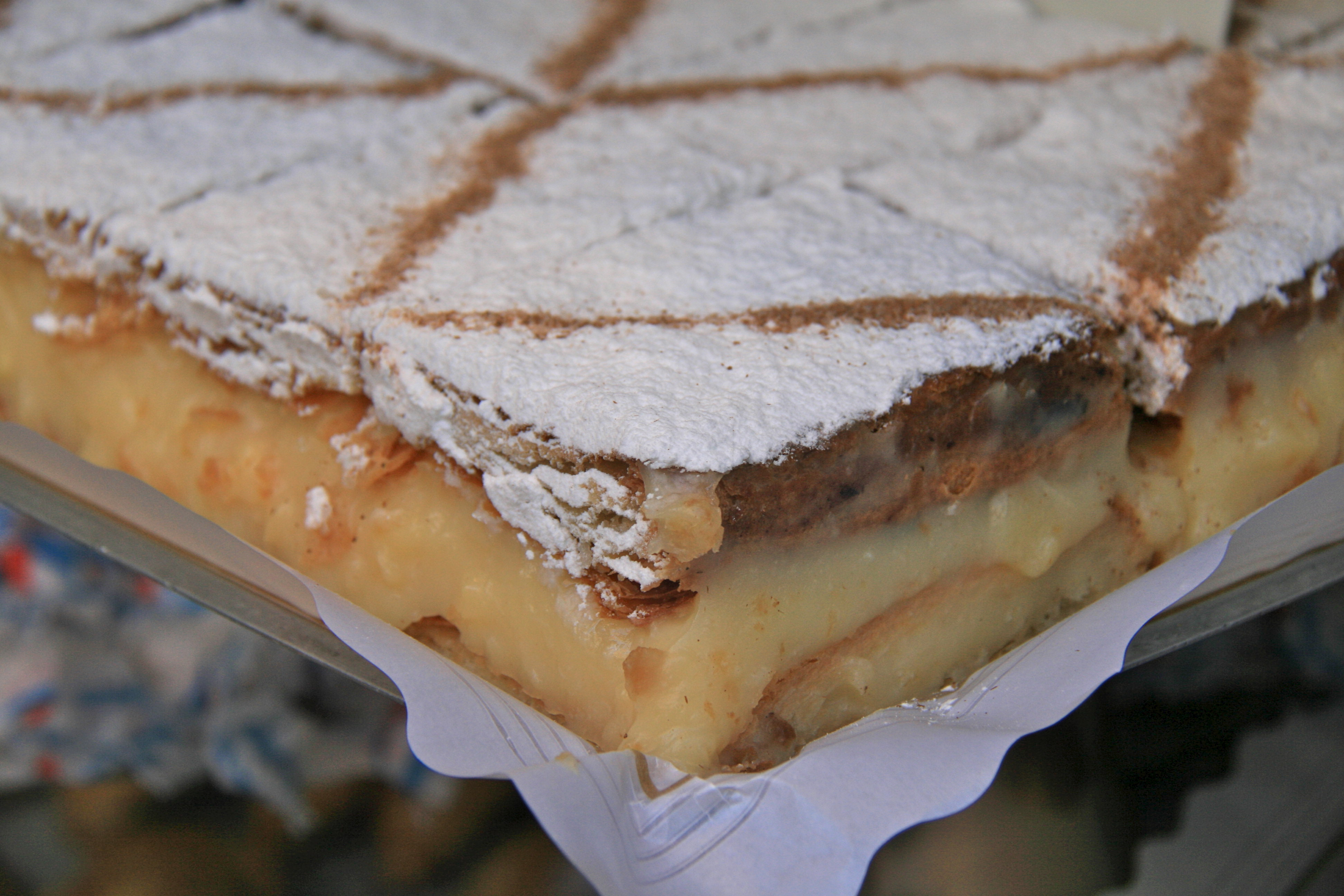
Milhojas from Madrid

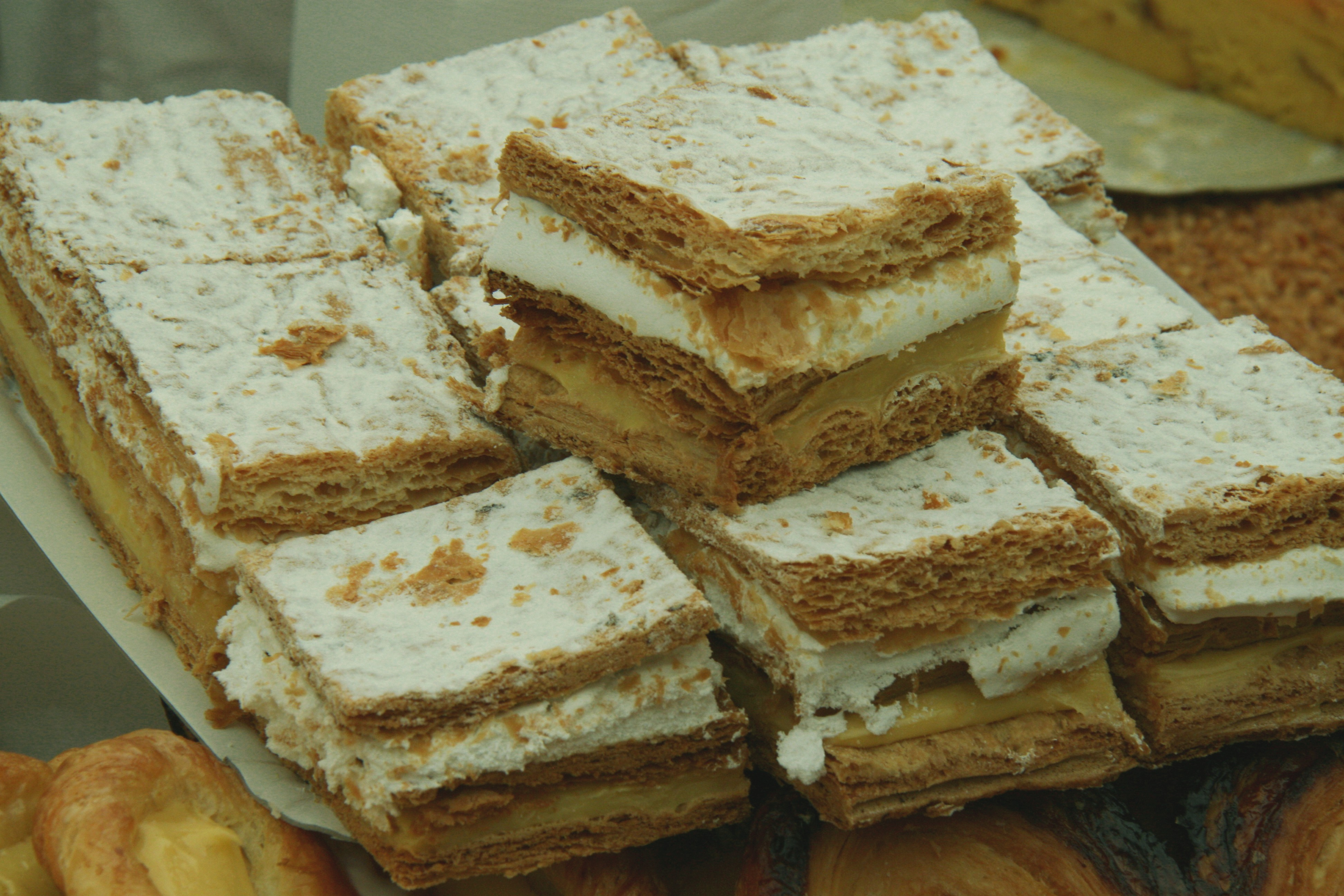
Millhojas Dos cremas de nata y pastelera (parte inferior)

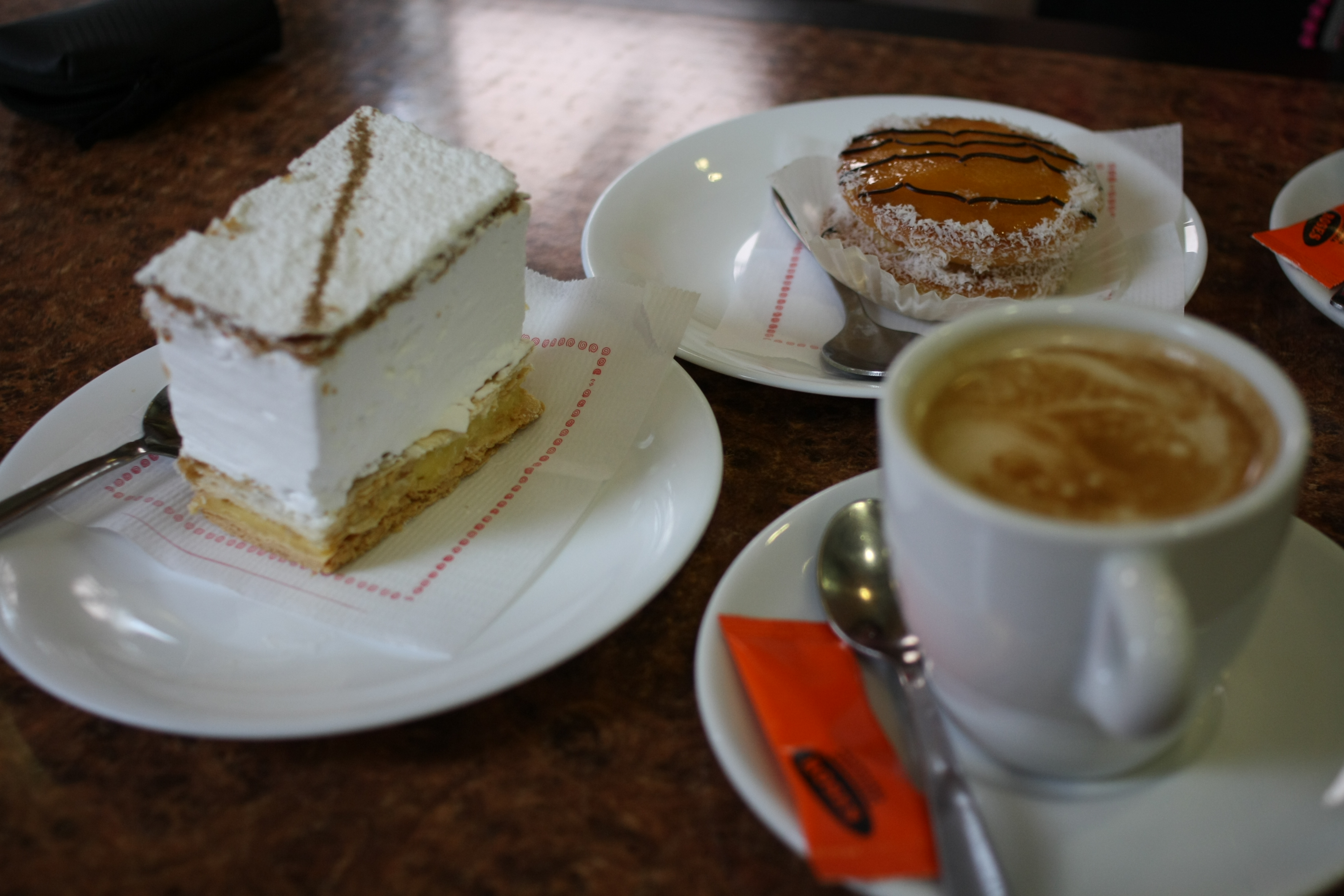
Coffee with milhoja and another pastry in Murcia

== See also ==
- Mille-feuille
- List of pastries
