= Crompouce =

Type of pastry in the Netherlands

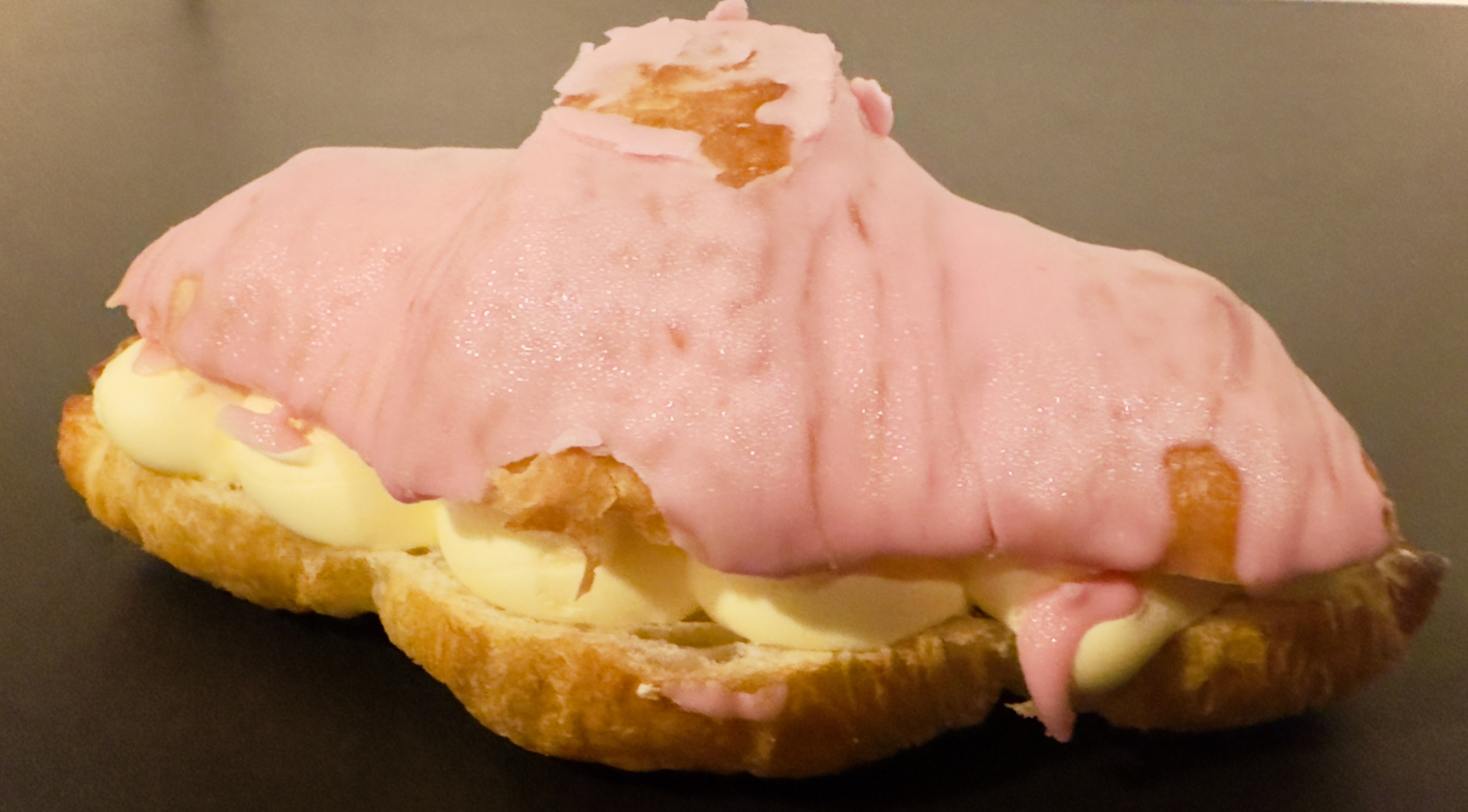
- Alternative names: Tompouce Croissant
- Type: Pastry
- Place of origin: Netherlands
- Created by: Bammetje Bakery
- Main ingredients: Croissant, icing, pastry cream

A crompouce is a mixture between a croissant and a tompouce that became a hit on social media platforms in 2023, in addition to being registered as a brand name. Croissant dough is used instead of puff pastry. The croissant is cut open and filled with pastry cream and topped with a layer of pink icing. The disadvantage of croissant dough, however, is that the dough is softer, making the cream more likely to leak through.

== History ==
The pastry in its current form and under the name crompouce was created by Utrecht-based Bammetje Bakery in 2020. After the crompouce by Katwijk-based Bakker van Maanen became a craze on social media platform TikTok in 2023, bakeries across the Netherlands started selling the product.

The hype of the crompouce was succeeded by that of the sûkerpoes from Friesland: two slices of sugar bread, with cream in between and the top slice of bread dipped in pink chocolate.

== Similar products ==
A so-called roze flap has been baked in the province of Zeeland since around 1993. The crompouce shows strong similarities to this pastry. However, a roze flap is made of puff pastry instead of croissant dough and has a slightly different shape (triangular).

Cream-filled croissants were sold at Bakkerij de Leeuw in Zegveld for a while around 2003. The crompouce also shows strong similarities with this, only the bakery did not use pink glaze.

== Reception ==
The crompouce was named treat of the year 2023 by Kek Mama magazine.

On 15 November 2023, the original maker criticised other makers, such as supermarkets, which she said had copied the crompouce. She took legal action for this. Following these legal actions against companies such as Albert Heijn, one of the supermarkets that sells crompouces, the crompouce has been renamed Tompouce Croissant in some stores. The creator does not have a patent on the product, but does have a patent on the brand name crompouce. According to the Netherlands Enterprise Agency (Rijksdienst voor Ondernemend Nederland), a patent on the product not possible because it is not a technical innovation.
