= Cremeschnitte =

Puff pastry dessert

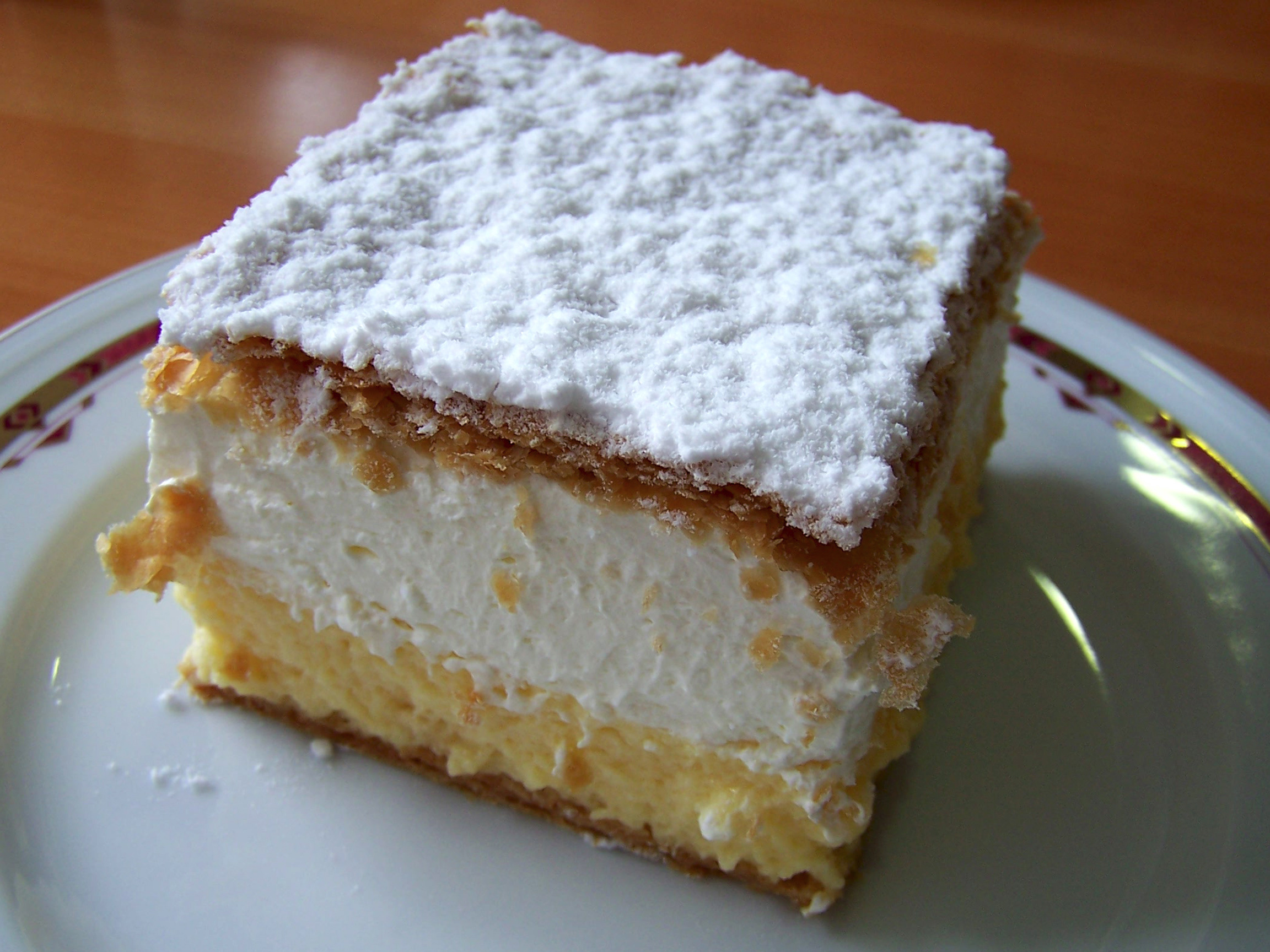
- Course: Dessert
- Place of origin: Europe
- Region or state: Austria-Hungary
- Main ingredients: Puff pastry, chantilly and custard cream
- Variations: Kremna rezina, Samoborska kremšnita, Zagrebačka kremšnita

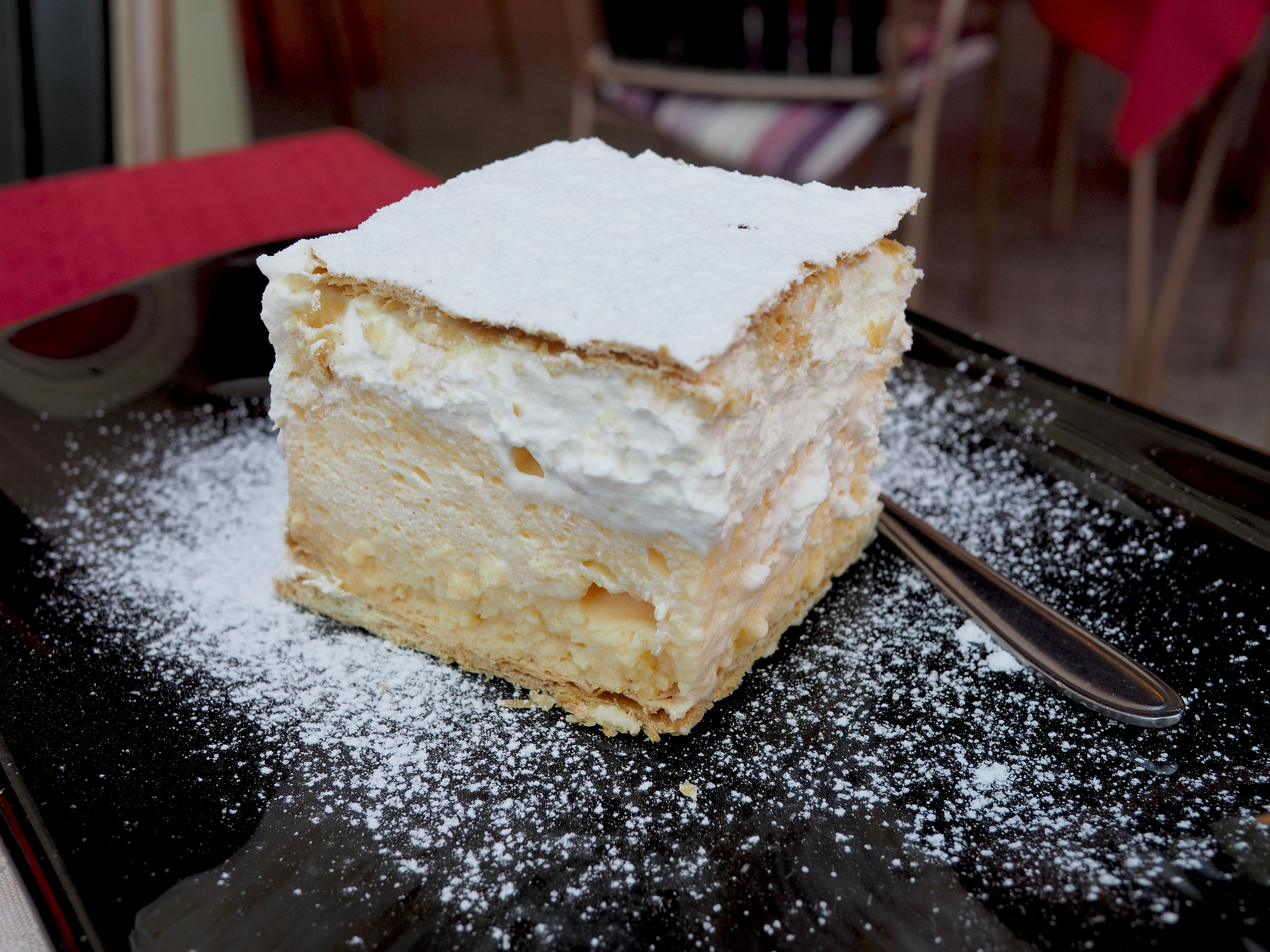
Famous Bled cremeschnitte

A cremeschnitte (German: Cremeschnitte, Czech: krémeš, Hungarian: krémes, Polish: kremówka, napoleonka, Romanian: cremșnit, cremeș, crempita, Bosnian and Serbian: krempita/кремпита, Croatian: kremšnita, krempita, Slovak: krémeš, Slovene: kremna rezina, kremšnita), also known as vanilla slice or custard slice, is a custard and chantilly cream cream cake dessert commonly associated with the former Austro-Hungarian Monarchy.

== By country ==
=== In Australia ===
Vanilla slice emerged as a variety of one of these similar desserts, but it is unknown which variety or varieties evolved into the modern dish.

=== In Slovenia ===
In Slovenia, kremna rezina is commonly associated with the town of Bled, an Alpine tourist destination in northwestern Slovenia. The cake recipe was brought to the local Hotel Park in 1953 by Ištvan Lukačević, chef of the hotel's confectionery store. He came to Bled from Serbia (Vojvodina) where a similar cake was already known. As of October 2009, 10 million cream cakes have been baked at the hotel's patisserie since its invention. The name of the dessert means simply "cream slice". Locals refer to it as kremšnita, from the German word Cremeschnitte, with the same meaning. While the kremna rezina from Bled celebrated their 10th million piece production, Slaščičarna Lenček, which is located in Domžale, in year 2013 celebrated the 75th anniversary since they have made their first one which is called Lenčkova kremna rezina.

=== In Croatia ===
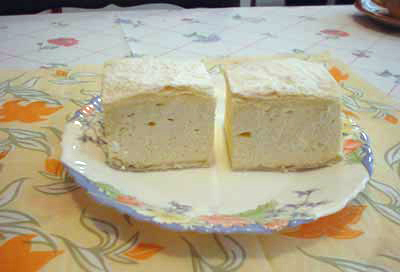
Krempita

In Croatia, the two most popular variants are Samoborska kremšnita from the town of Samobor and Zagrebačka kremšnita from the capital, Zagreb. The extremely popular Samoborska kremšnita is characterized by having a puff pastry top, predominantly custard cream filling (less whipped cream) with meringue and is finished with powdered sugar. Zagrebačka kremšnita has a characteristic chocolate icing instead of the puff pastry top, while maintaining the puff pastry base. The classic recipe for Samoborska kremšnita is considered to be designed by Đuro Lukačić in the early 1950s, based on different earlier variants found in patisseries of Zagreb.

=== In Bosnia and Herzegovina, Serbia ===
In Bosnia and Herzegovina, Serbia, and Montenegro, the dish is known as krempita 'cream pie'. It is usually prepared with puff pastry dough. The filling is usually pure thick custard, less commonly combined with meringue (whipped egg whites and sugar) creme. A similar recipe with only meringue filling is called Šampita.

=== In Montenegro ===
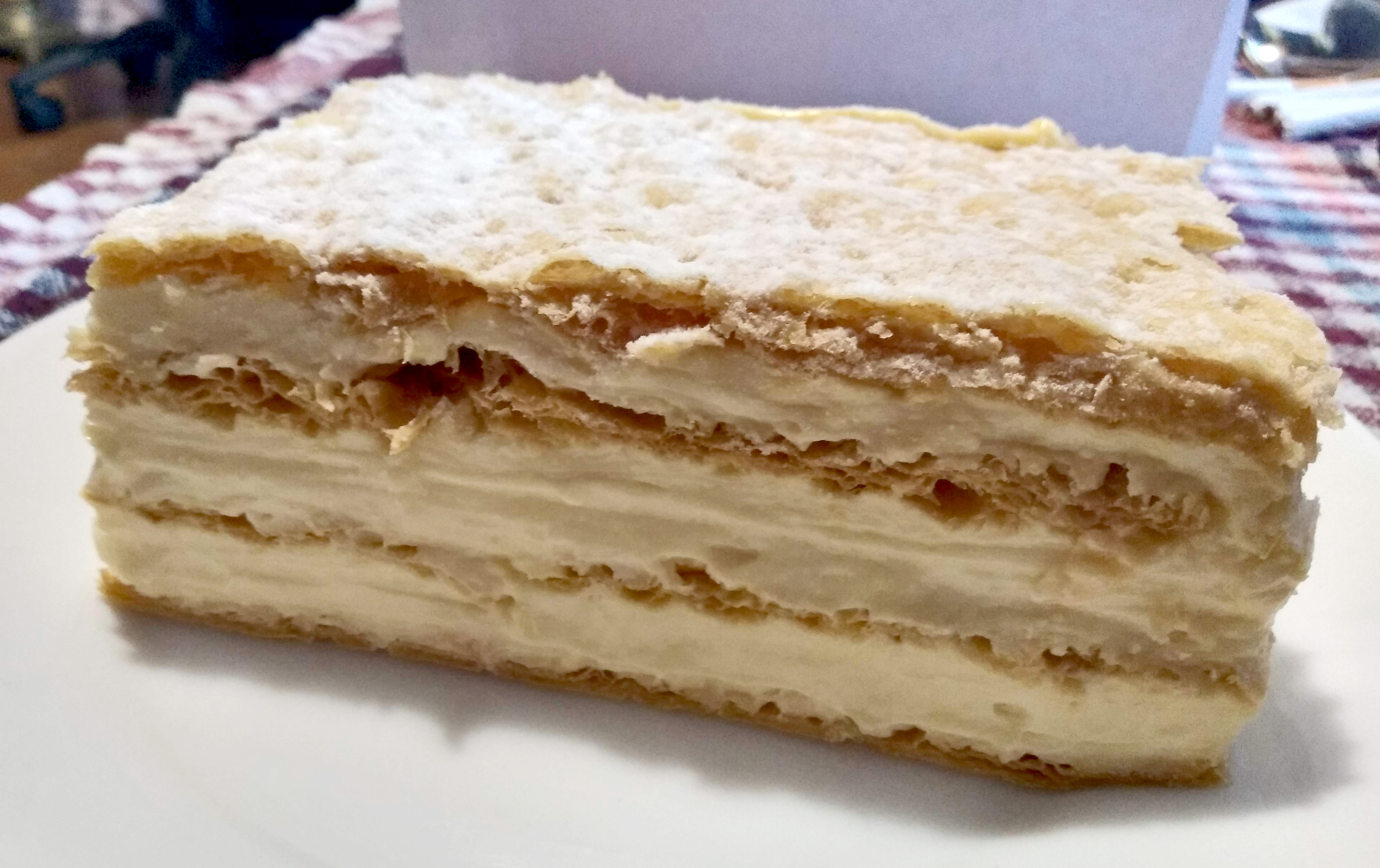
Kotorske krempite with three layers of dough and two layers of cream

In Montenegro, the most famous are the Kotorska krempita or Kotorska pašta (Kotor Cremeschnitte). Except for the original recipe, they differ from other crempitas because they are made with three layers of dough and two layers of cream. The "Kotorska pašta" festival dedicated to this delicacy is held in Kotor every year.

=== In Romania ===
Romanian Cremeș, or Cremșnit has a compacted puff pastry top and base (a weighted bake) and a custard layer between them. It is usually sprinkled with icing sugar.

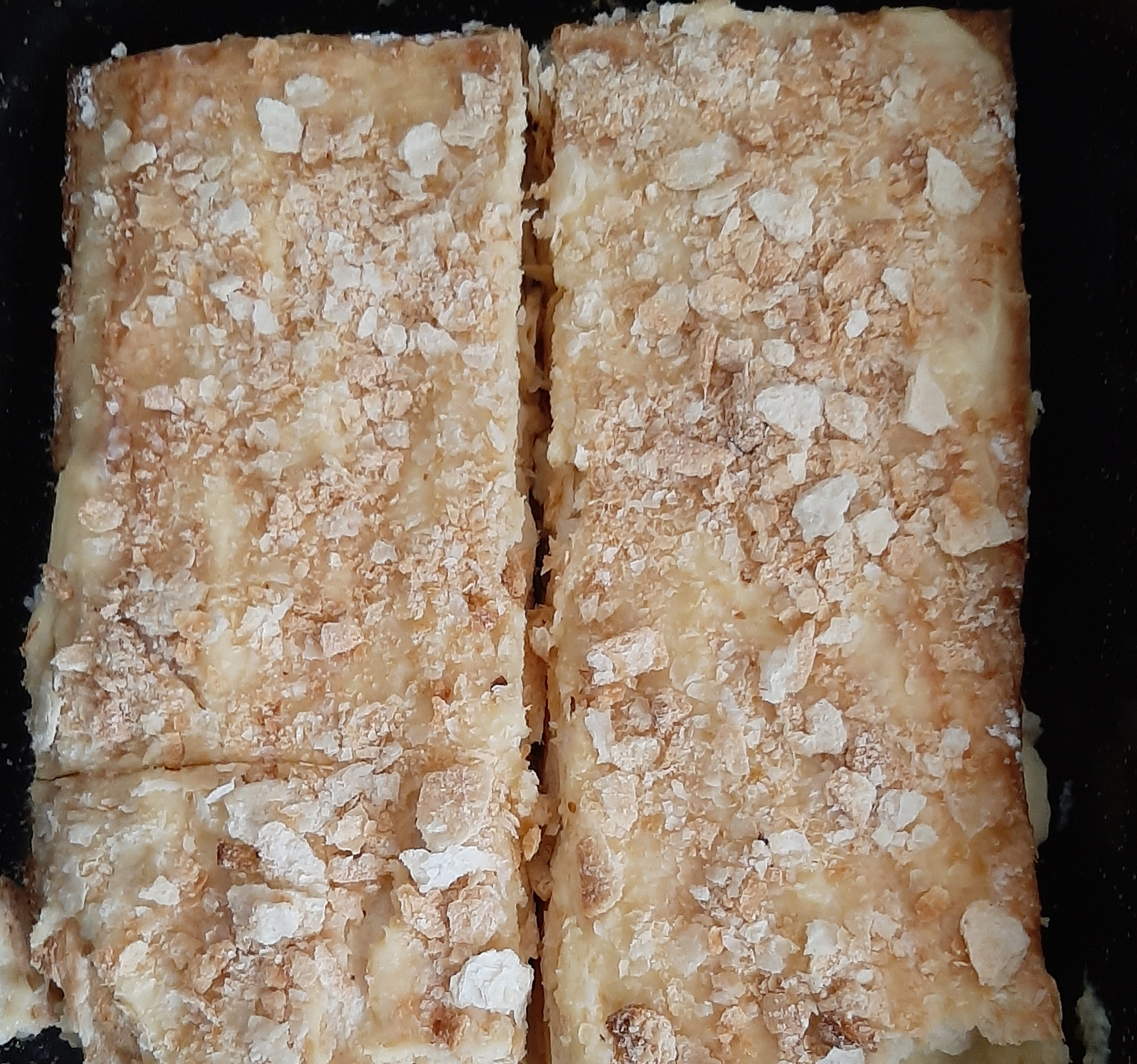
Cremșnit Romanian version

== See also ==
- Custard pie
- Napoleonka (kremówka)
- List of custard desserts
- Mille-feuille
- Tompouce
