= Vanilla slice =

Australian pastry

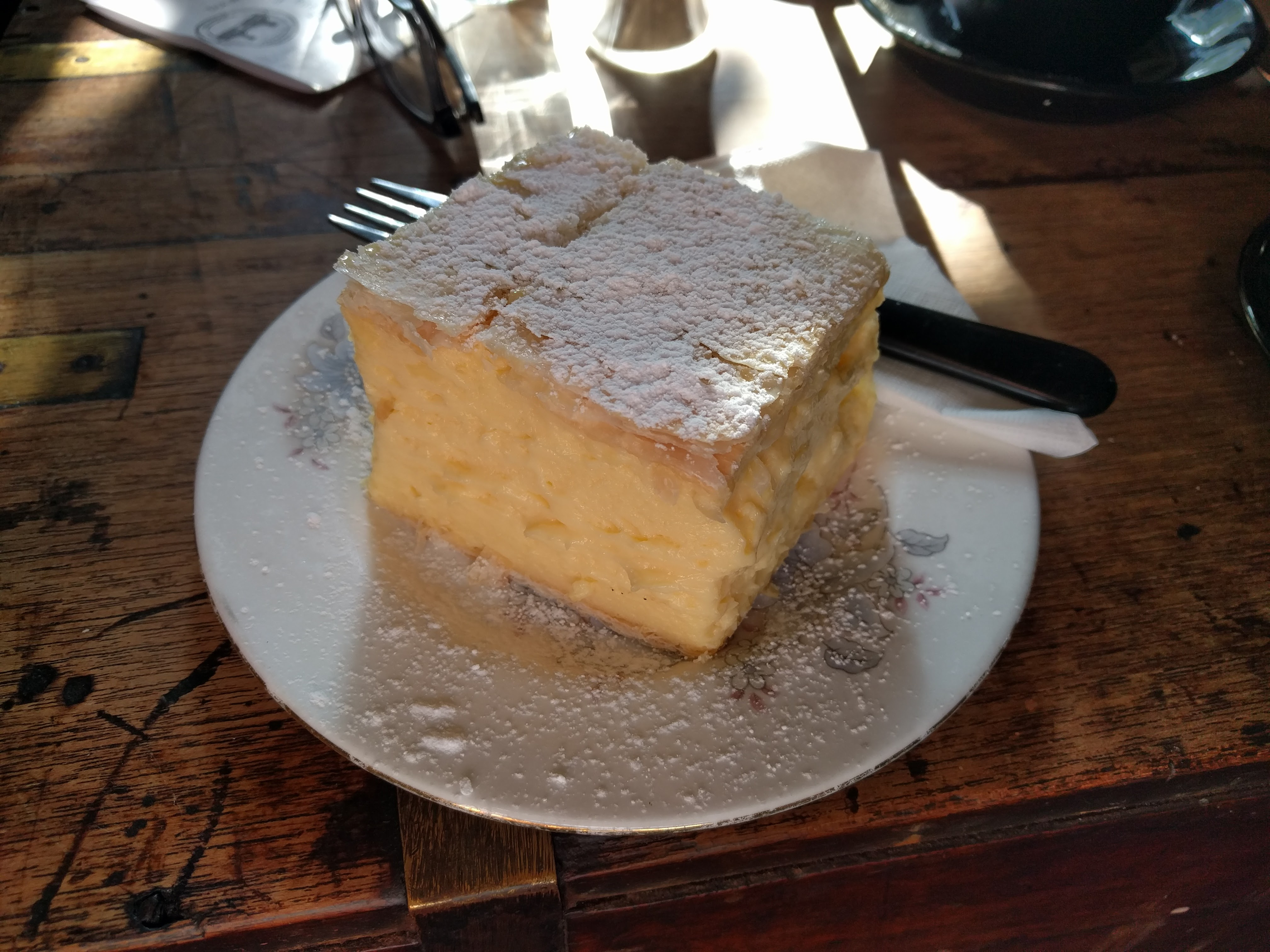
- Vanilla slice served in a Tasmanian bakery
- Alternative names: Snot block, snot brick, phlegm cake, pus pie
- Type: Pastry
- Course: Dessert
- Place of origin: Australia
- Main ingredients: Puff pastry, custard, powdered sugar

Vanilla slice is an Australian pastry comprising a thick layer of vanilla custard sandwiched between puff pastry and topped with icing sugar or a thin layer of icing. Similar varieties of the dessert exist in Europe and North America, and it is believed to have evolved from one of the similar European desserts.

== History ==
Vanilla slice is an Australian variation of many similar desserts comprising vanilla custard and flaky pastry. Most notably this includes the Mille-feuille, which is believed to have originated in France. Other similar pastries include the Dutch Tompouce, Polish Napoleonka and Kremówka Papieska, German Cremeschnitte, Balkan and Middle Eastern Galaktoboureko, among others. It is believed that the Australian vanilla slice emerged as a variety of one of these similar desserts, but it is unknown which variety or varieties evolved into the modern vanilla slice.

== Culture ==
Vanilla slice is strongly ingrained within Australian "bakery culture", commonly featuring in bakeries across the nation. In keeping with the informality and disdain for pretence in Australian vernacular, it is common to refer to the dessert using colloquial names based on bodily fluids such as pus, phlegm, or nasal mucus which are similar in appearance to the custard filling. This includes names such as snot block, snot brick, phlegm cake, or pus pie.

To celebrate its cultural significance, an annual competition known as The Great Australian Vanilla Slice Triumph has been held since 1998. The event began after Victorian Premier Jeff Kennett visited the Victorian town of Ouyen, and considered the local bakery to make the best vanilla slice in Australia. The event was hosted annually in Ouyen until 2001, when it moved to the nearby town of Merbein.

== See also ==
- List of Australian desserts
- List of custard desserts
