= Šampita =

Meringue dessert from Balkan

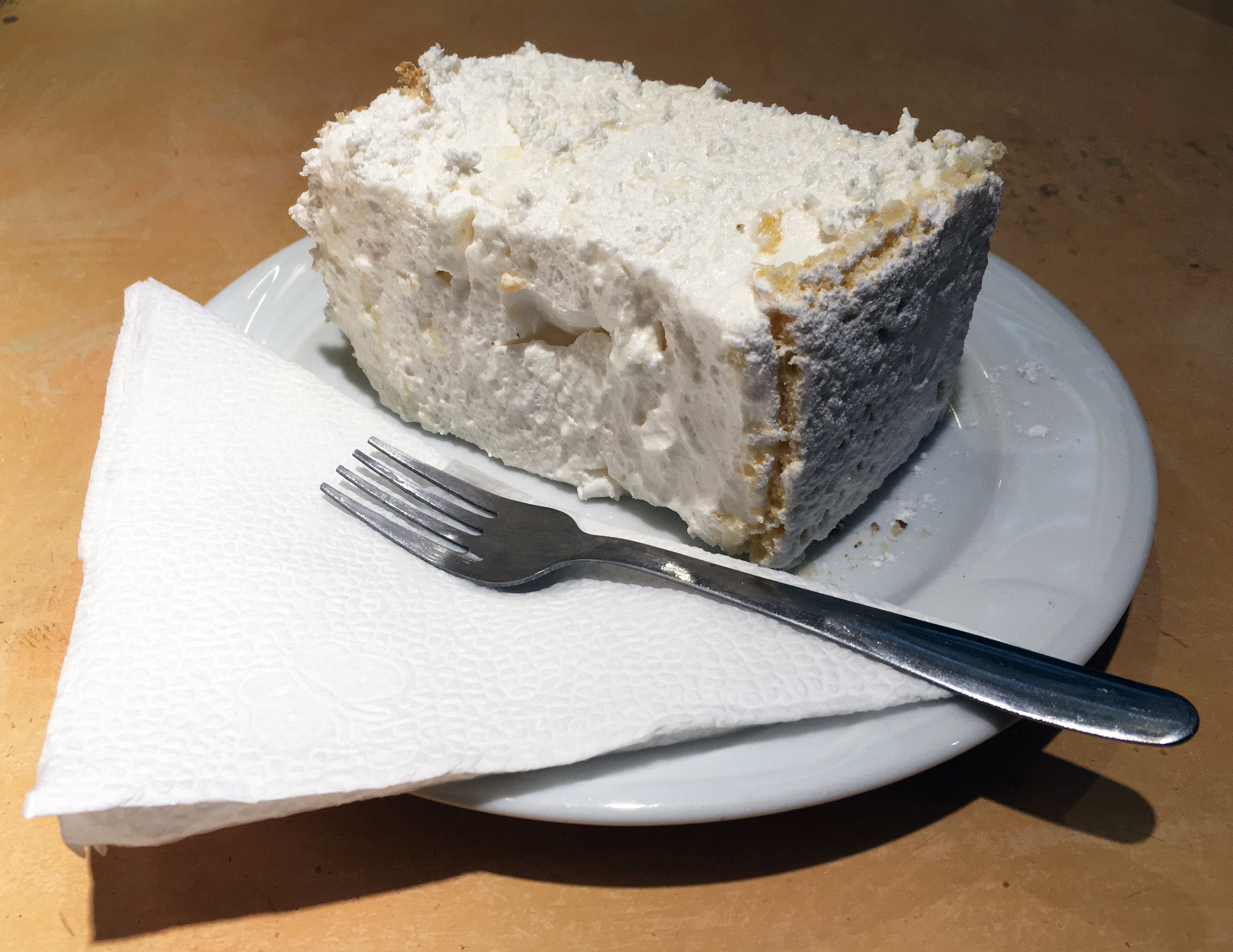
- Course: Dessert
- Serving temperature: Chilled or room-temperature
- Main ingredients: Meringue, egg whites
- Variations: Krempita

Šampita (Serbian Cyrillic: Шампита) is a whipped meringue dessert with egg yolk crust, originating in Serbia. The name is a combination of the German word Schaum "foam", and the Serbian word of Greek origin, pita "pie".

== Gallery ==
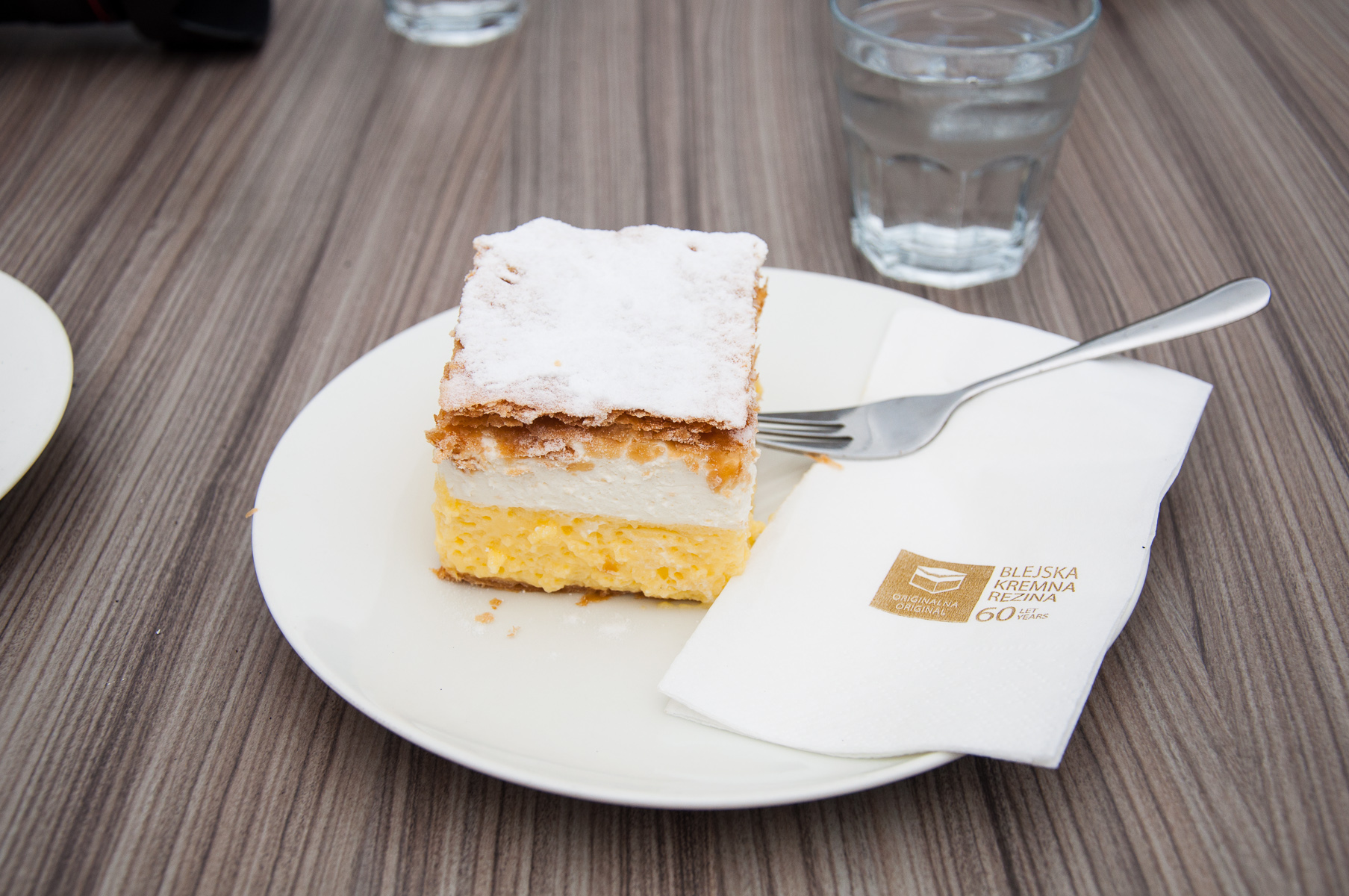
Bled šampita (kremna rezina)

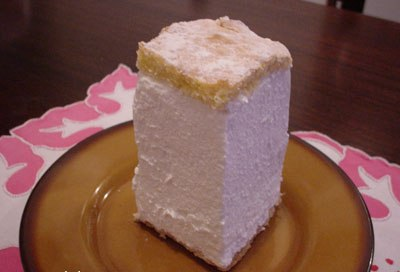
Šampita from Serbia

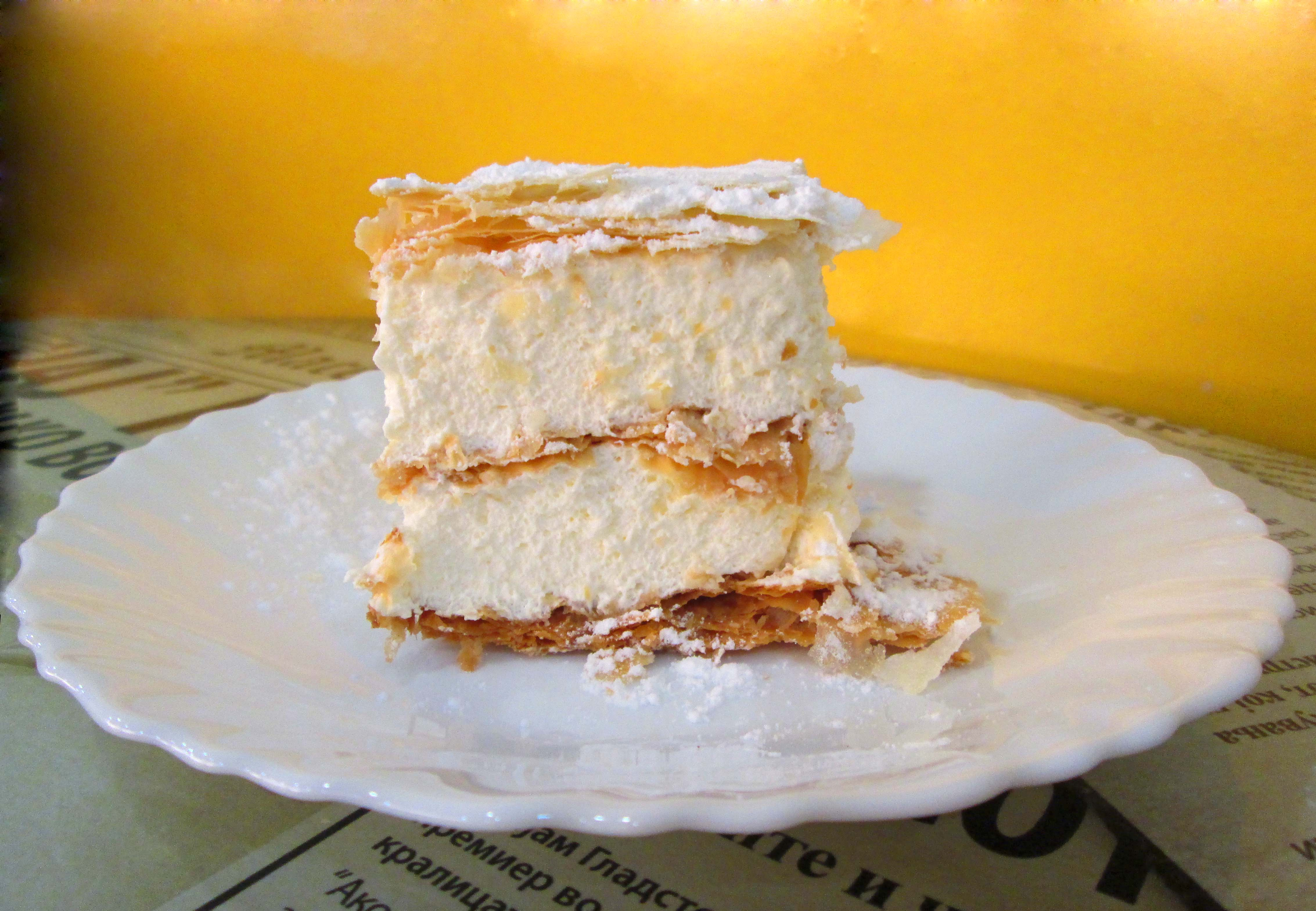
Šampita from North Macedonia

== See also ==
- Cremeschnitte
