= Ajmokac =

Traditional dish of Serbian and Vojvodina cuisine

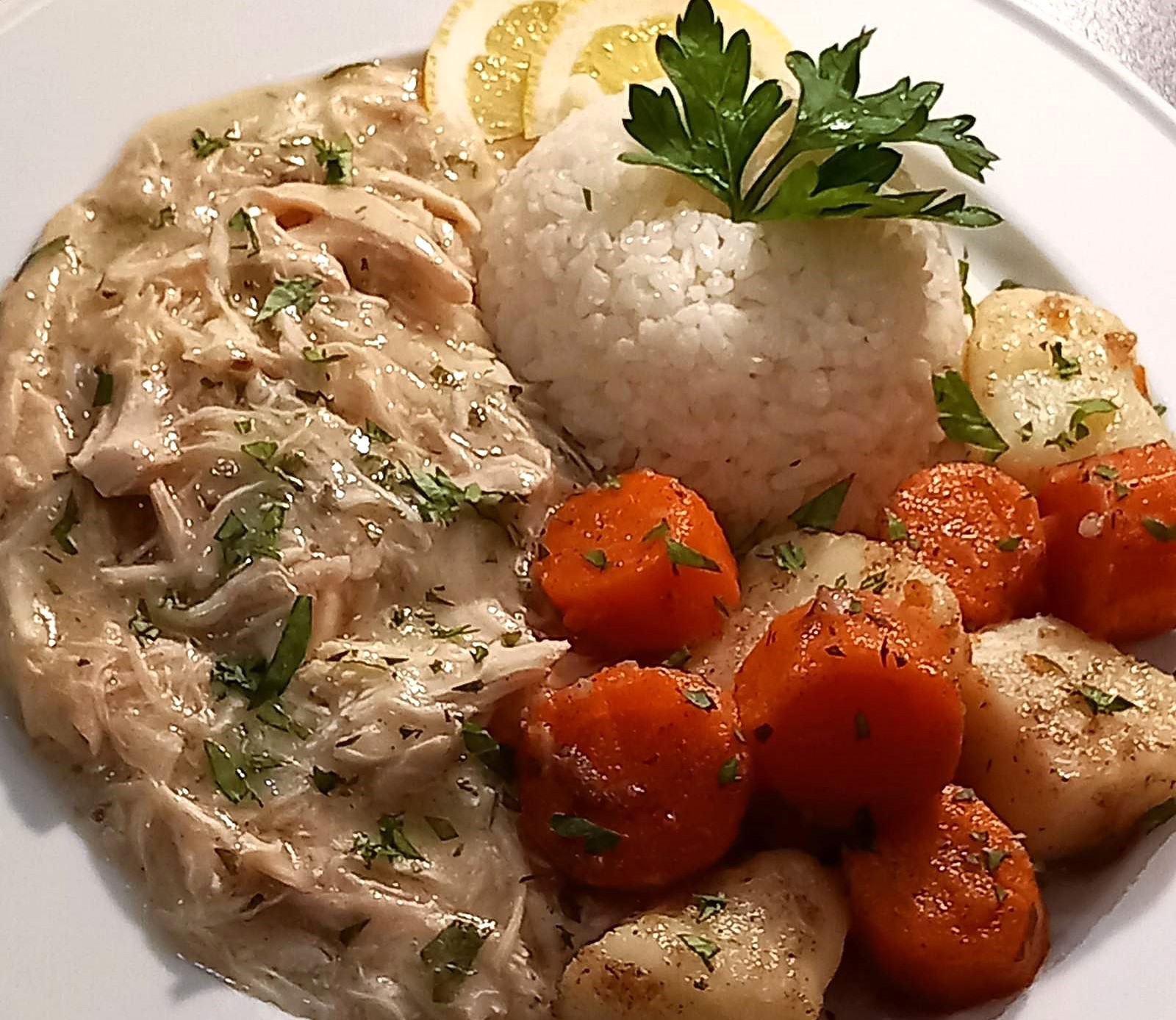
- Associated cuisine: Serbian
- Main ingredients: chicken, flour, milk, sour cream

Ajmokac is a traditional dish of Serbian and Vojvodina cuisine. It has been part of the standard Bačka Sunday lunch and is served as a main course, especially in Vojvodina and Slavonia.

== Preparation ==
It is prepared from boiled chicken in a sauce based on flour, milk and sour cream, ajmokac was a specialty served with mashed potatoes, polenta or homemade bread.

In the past, ajmokac was prepared in large pots, where the meat would be cooked for hours until it became soft and juicy, and then it would be gently mixed with a thick, creamy sauce that would combine with all the richness of the flavors.

There are many alternatives to this traditional dish. People prepare it in various ways, adding spices to their taste, but the base of the recipe remains the same: chicken, milk, sour cream, and flour, which are combined into a sauce.

== See more ==
- Serbian cuisine
