= Serbian cuisine =

Culinary traditions of Serbia

Serbian cuisine (Serbian: српска кухиња, romanized: srpska kuhinja) is a Balkan cuisine that consists of the culinary methods and traditions of Serbia. Its roots lie in Serbian history, including centuries of cultural contact and influence with the Greeks and the Byzantine Empire, the Ottoman Empire, and Serbia's Balkan neighbours, especially during the existence of Yugoslavia. With Serbia being located on the crossroads between East and West, its cuisine has gathered elements from different cooking styles across the Middle East and Europe to develop its own gastronomy with a balance of meats, vegetables, breads, cheese, pastries, and desserts. It has much in common with the cuisines of neighboring Balkan countries; its flavors are mild, fresh, and natural. Seasonings are usually salt, black pepper, and paprika, while ingredients are known for being fresh and high-quality. Seasonal food is an important element of Serbian cuisine, thus many dishes are strongly associated with a specific time of the year. Historically, Serbian food develops from pastoral customs that involved the keeping of sheep in mountain highlands, in a climate and regional context that favoured animal husbandry over vegetable farming; Serbian food is therefore traditionally richer in animal products and basic grains—corn, wheat and oats—than fresh vegetable dishes. Following the abandonment of widely practiced pastoral lifestyles, Serbian food emerged through the Middle Ages heavily dependent not on lamb or mutton, but on the keeping of pigs for the annual cull and the production of various cured meats, such as sausages, bacon and ham products.

National dishes of Serbia include sarma (a mix of ground pork or beef with rice rolled in leaves of cabbage), gibanica (an egg and cheese pie made with filo dough), pljeskavica (a ground beef or pork patty), ćevapi (grilled meat), paprikaš (a soup made of paprika), gulaš (soup of meat and vegetables usually seasoned with paprika and other spices) and Karađorđeva šnicla (a schnitzel). The national drink is rakia (various traditional fruit brandies).

The Serbian government has passed laws banning the production and import of genetically modified foods, a legislative decision which has been applauded by environmentalists but caused a long-running dispute with the World Trade Organization, preventing Serbia from being able to join the WTO.

== Overview ==
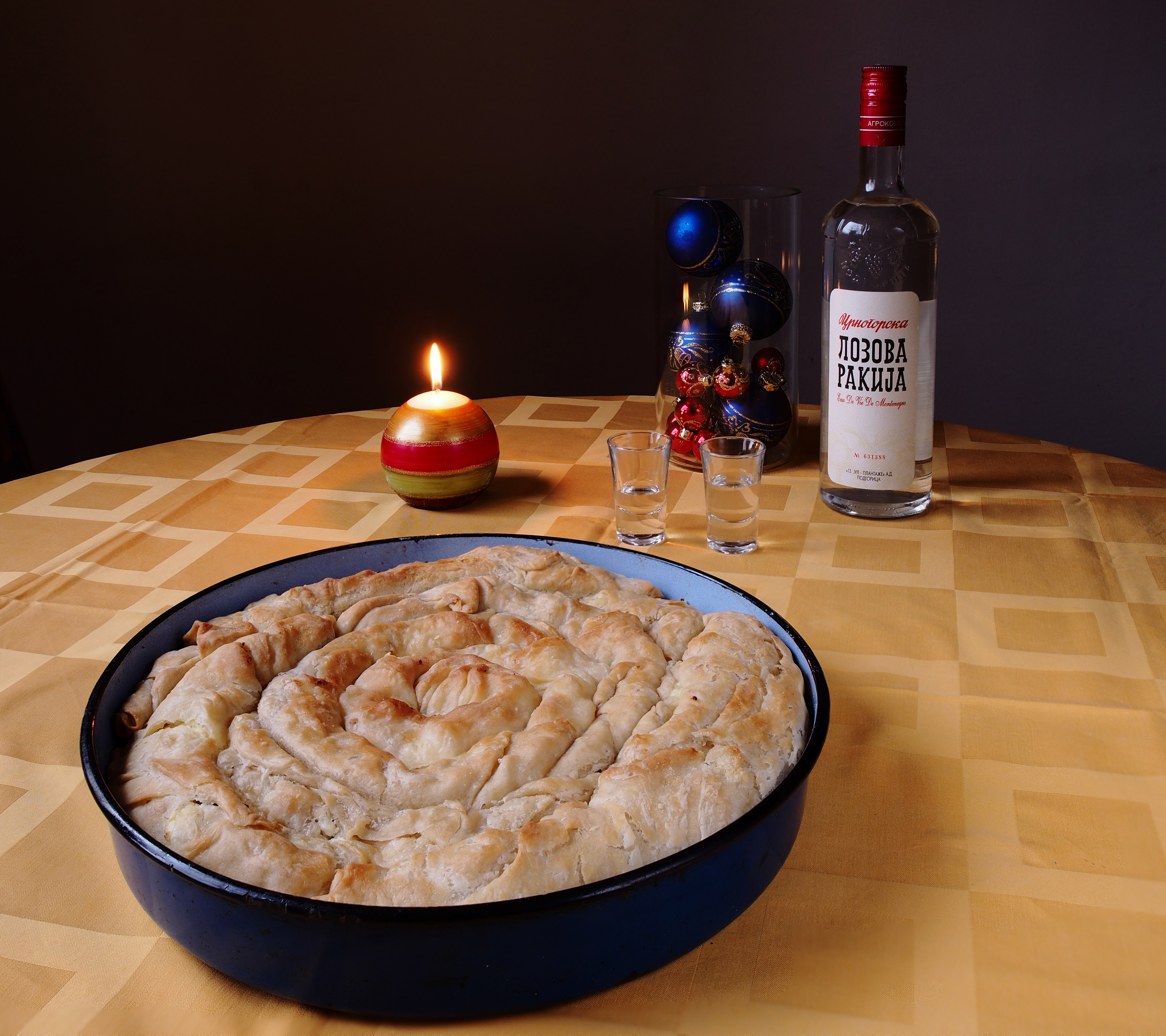
A Serbian rolled pie

Serbian cuisine developed under the influence of the moderate continental climate and historical mingling of cultures, with Byzantine, Ottoman and Austro-Hungarian influences being crucial in its formation. Serbia is at the crossroads of the East and West, and this is shown in the contrasting variety in the cuisine. Serbian food is characteristically Balkan, and heavy on meat, dairy, and grains, owing to history and geography. Pastoralism has been important as significant territory is mountainous, and in the Ottoman period, Serbs became more dependent on dairy products, and also significantly incorporated pork, which the Muslim Ottomans did not enforce taxes on. William of Tyre who travelled to Constantinople in 1179, described the Serbs as "rich in herds and flocks and unusually well-supplied with milk, cheese, butter, meat, honey, and wax". Cheese, pies and breads are included in almost every meal, and meat in at least one meal. Seasoning such as bay leaves were introduced from the Mediterranean trade, and peppers were introduced in the 1600s and became a staple; Paprika, which is especially used, is a major export product.

The Taste Atlas for 2023/2024 listed Serbia at the 20th place of national cuisines, and included the most popular dishes as Pljeskavica (patty), Pasulj (bean stew), Ajvar (relish), Gibanica (cheese-and-egg pie), Burek (pastry), Sarma (stuffed sour cabbage), Karađorđe schnitzel, Prebranac (bean stew), Donuts, Urnebes (relish), etc. Serbian food is of high quality owing to five million hectares of agricultural land of which farms use no genetic modifications. Healthy food is found in markets sold directly from farmers. There are three meals per day. Generally, breakfast is strong, consisting of savory pastry, while lunch is the most important, eaten in early afternoon, and dinner is light. Ordinary home meals include cooked dishes, such as boiled peas, beans or other vegetables, stews and casseroles, moussaka, soups, baked, fried or grilled meat, and salads. For tourists, portions are large, and local dishes are found in cozy kafanas which offer coffee, drinks, snacks and small meals. The kafanas were adapted from Ottoman coffeshops, and feature ethnic Serbian food, drinks and music. Cuisine is heavily integrated with hospitality and holidays.

Serbian ethnologist Dragomir Antonić (1948–2020) studied Serbian cuisine. There are regional variations and specialties, with Austro-Hungarian influences dominant in the northern province of Vojvodina, where noodles, macaroni, buns, dumpling and patties are popular, although there are variations between sub-regions, where Srem uses much more spices than in Banat for instance. East of the Great Morava, hard cheese are popular specialties, while to the west of it, between Drina and Morava, kajmak is the best, especially in the Čačak area. The best pork rotisserie is found in the area between Gornji Milanovac and Mrčajevci (in Šumadija), while the best lamb is in the Raška region and eastern Serbia. Paprika is characteristic of southern Serbia.

The Orthodox monk Jerotej of Krušedol wrote the oldest modern Serbian cookbook in 1855. The first published cookbook in Serbia is The Big Serbian Cookbook (Велики српски кувар), written by Katarina Popović-Midzina in 1877. The best known Serbian cookbook is Pata's Cookbook (Патин кувар), written by Spasenija Pata Marković in 1907; the book remains in publication even today.

The Serbian government has passed laws banning the production and import of genetically modified foods, a legislative decision which has been applauded by environmentalists but caused a long-running dispute with the World Trade Organization, preventing Serbia from being able to join the WTO.

== Meal culture ==
=== Breakfast ===
Breakfast in Serbia is an early but hearty meal, rich in calories and carbohydrates. Bread is frequently served with butter, jam, yogurt, sour cream, or cheese, accompanied by bacon, sausage, salami, eggs, or kajmak. Serbians often stop by a bakery in the morning for fresh pastries such as pogačice, paštete, kifle (which in Serbian usage may or may not be crescent-shaped, and may be sweet, but may also be sprinkled with salt crystals), kiflice, pretzels, buhtle, plaited bread (pletenice), breadstick (štapići), kaiser roll (zemičke), sesame seed bread (đevrek), fried dough (mekike, uštipci, etc.). Other common breakfast dishes include various phyllo pastries (burek, gibanica, etc.), kačamak (maize porridge), and cicvara (types of polenta), proja (cornbread), and čalabrca and popara (stale crumbs). A popular dish is the komplet lepinja ("the complete flatbread"), with kajmak, egg, and roasted meat drippings.

Before breakfast most people usually have a cup of traditional coffee (domaća kafa) or espresso, and with the breakfast itself either tea, milk, milk coffee, or chocolate milk.

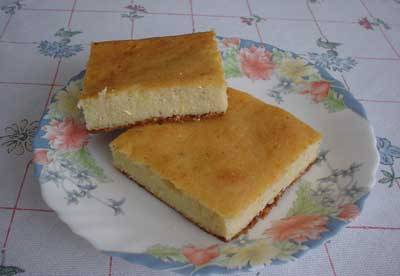
Proja

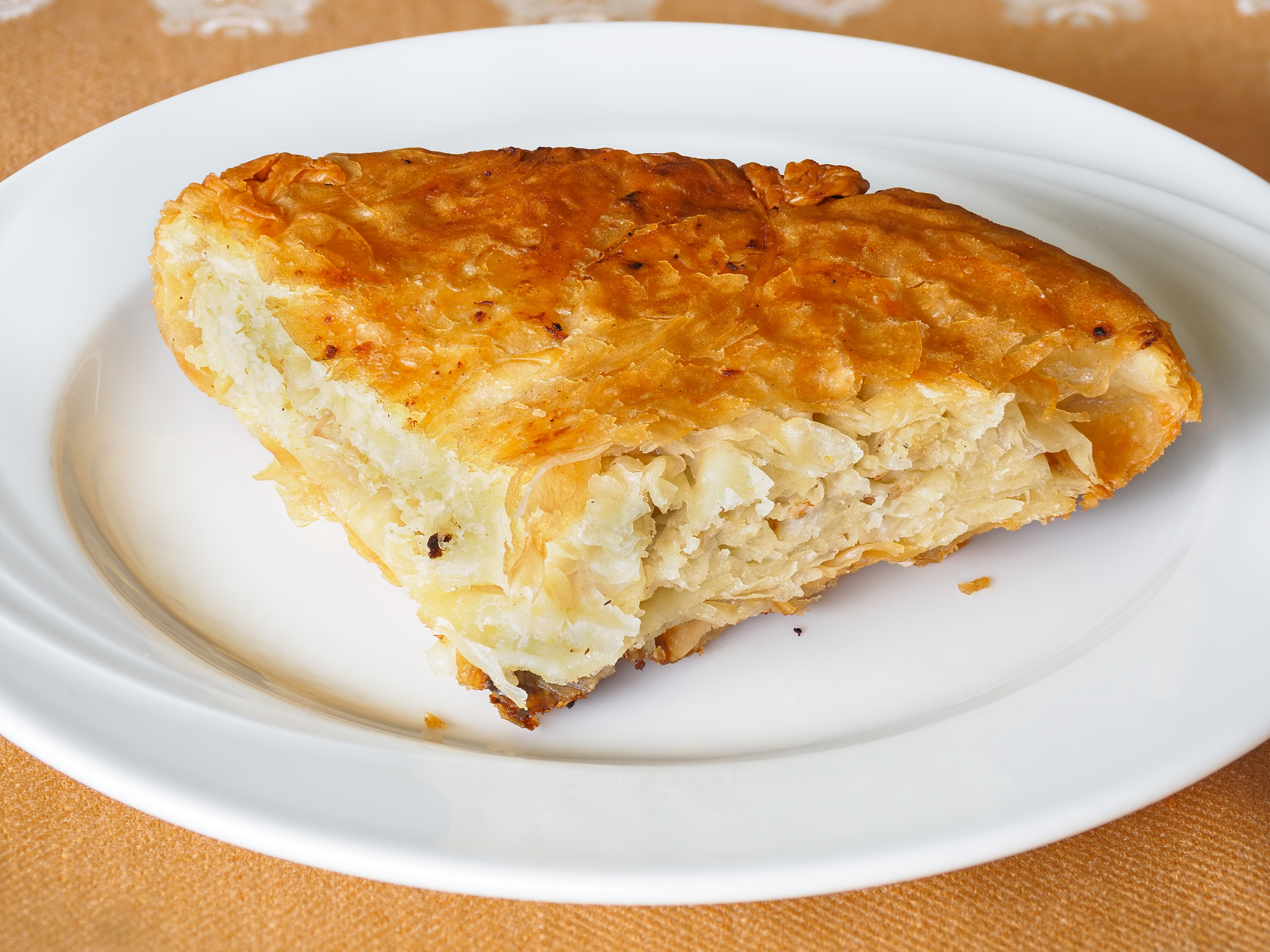
Burek with meat

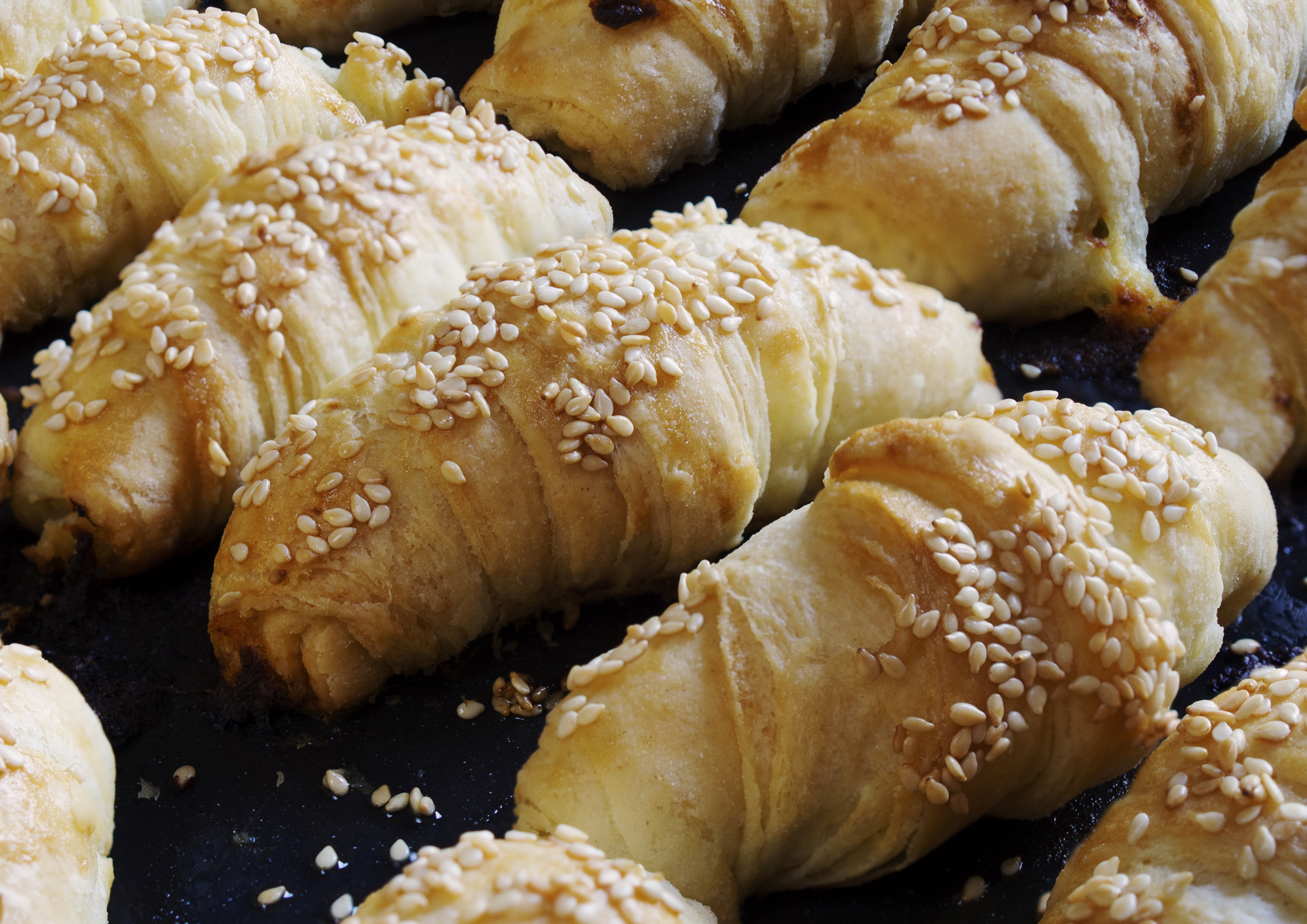
Kiflice

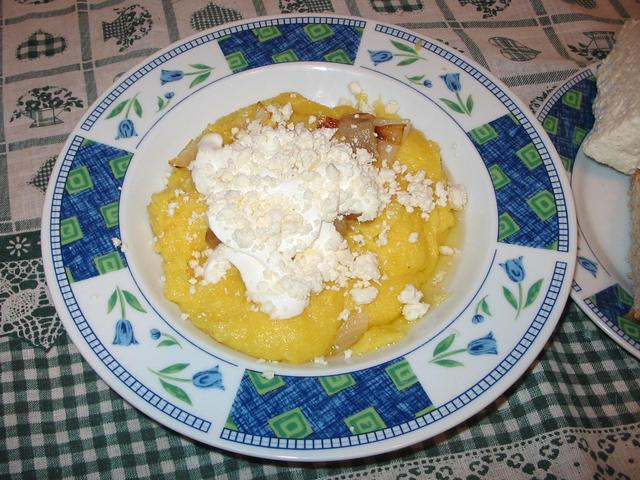
Kačamak

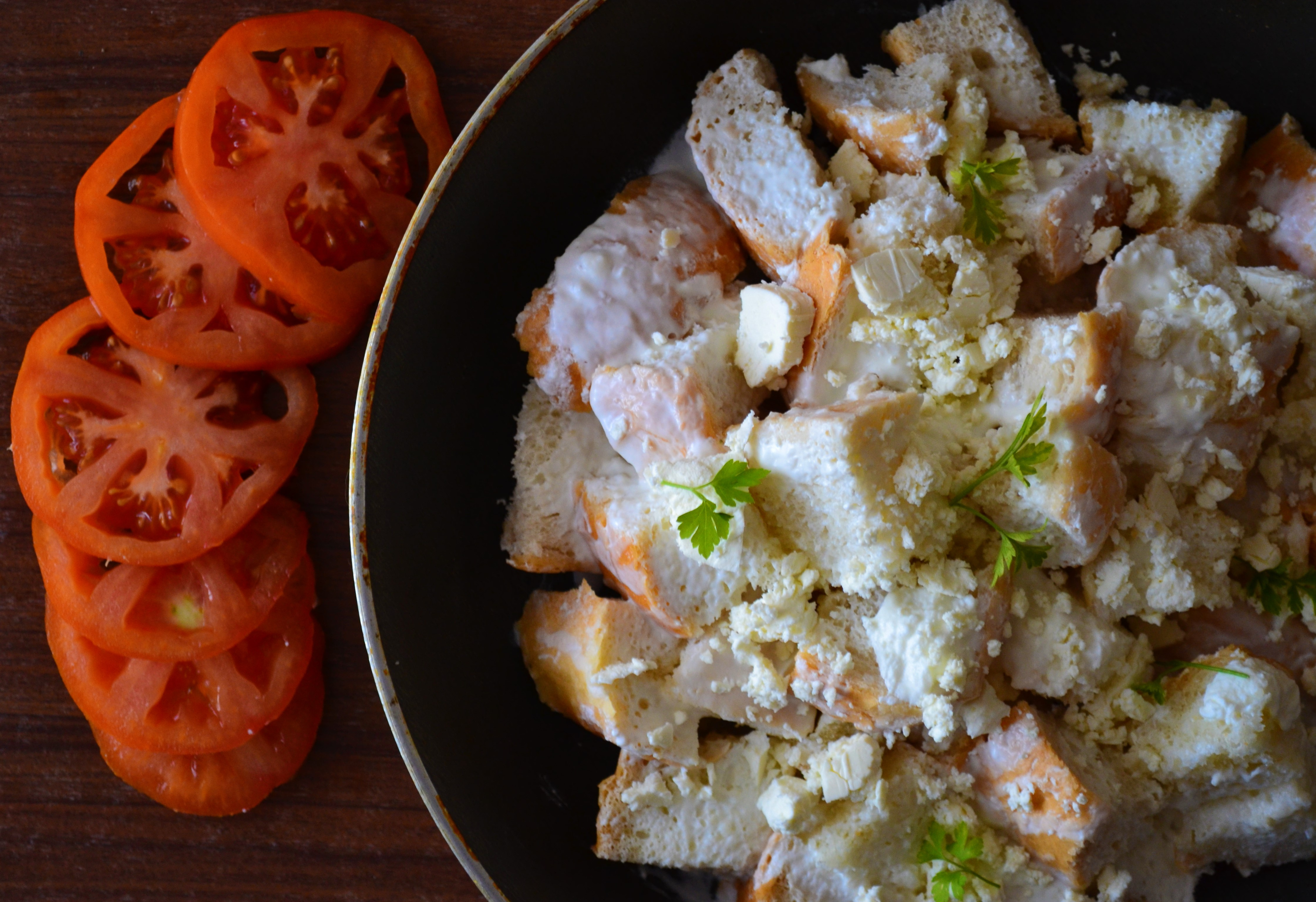
Popara

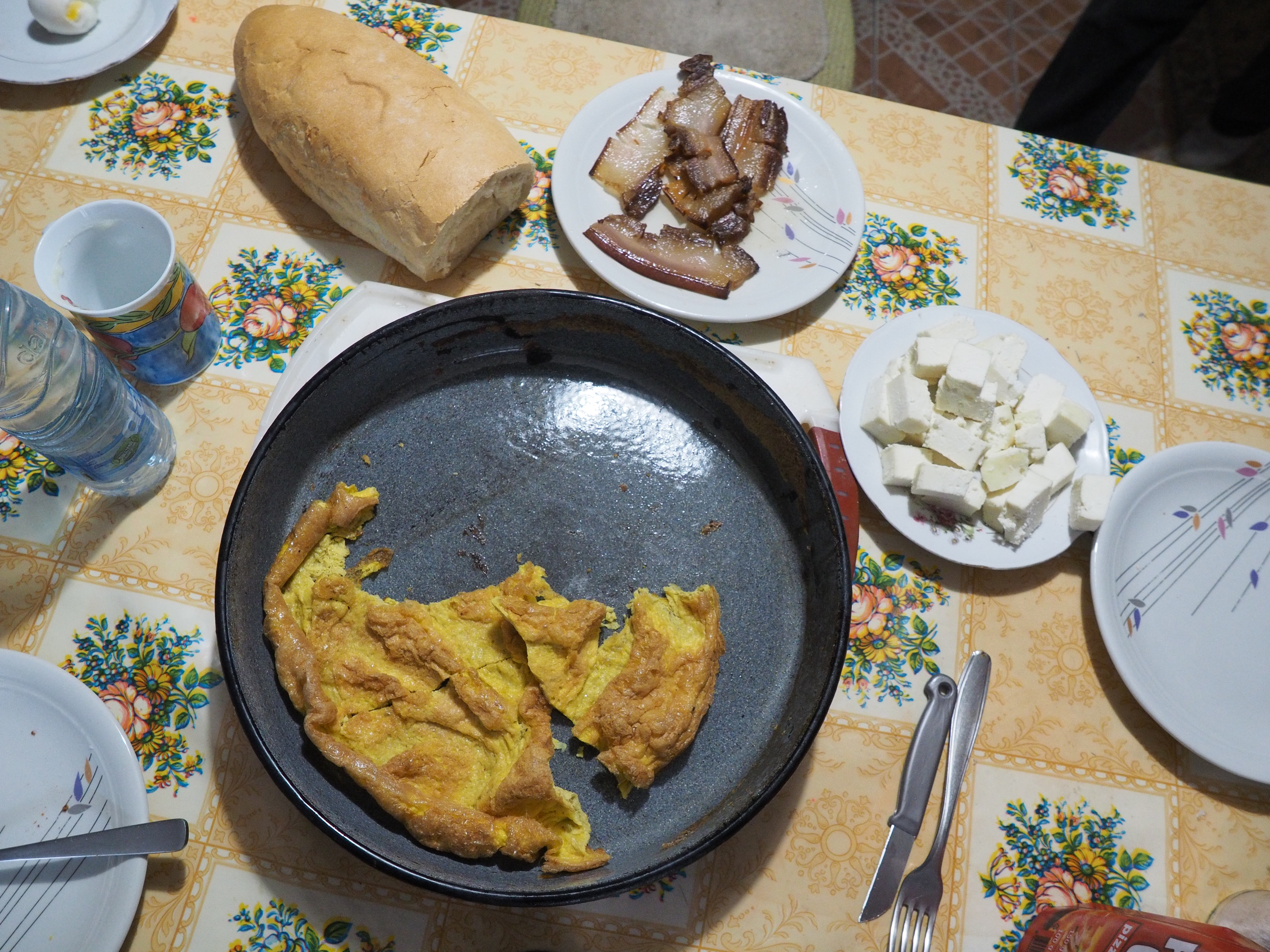
Kajgana

=== Appetizers ===
Meze is an assortment of small dishes and appetizers, though, unlike the Middle Eastern meze, it does not usually include cooked dishes, and is therefore more similar to Italian antipasto. A Serbian meze typically includes slices of cured meats and sausages, cheeses, olives, fresh vegetables, and zimnica. In most traditional restaurants (kafana), meze is often ordered in combination with the alcoholic drink rakija as a starter before a soup or main dishes.

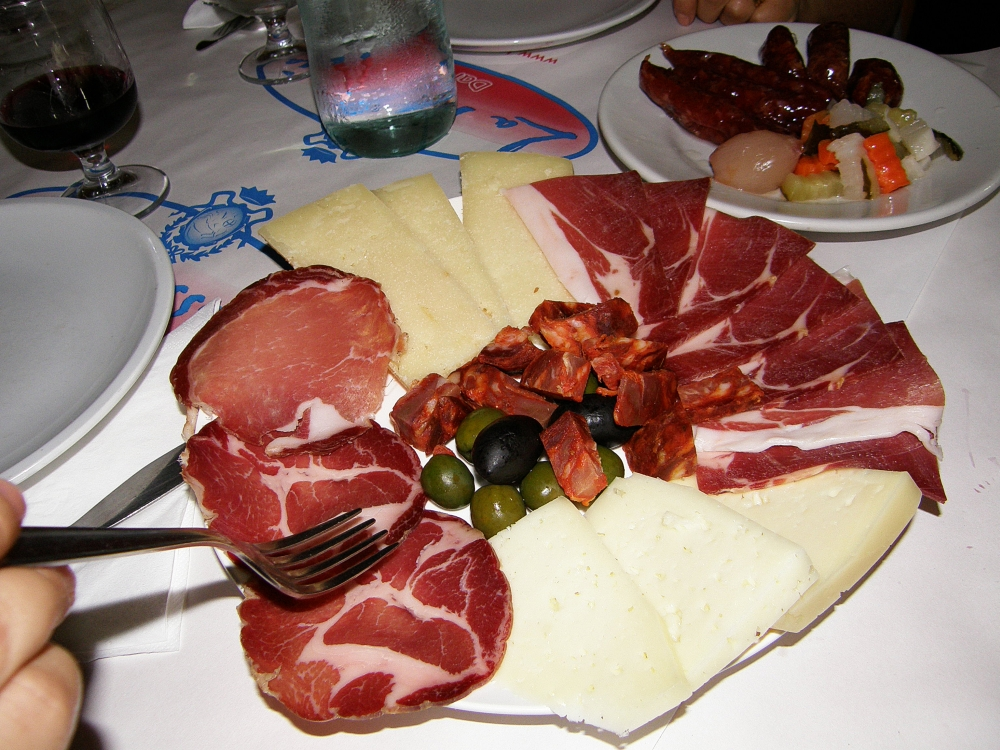
Meze

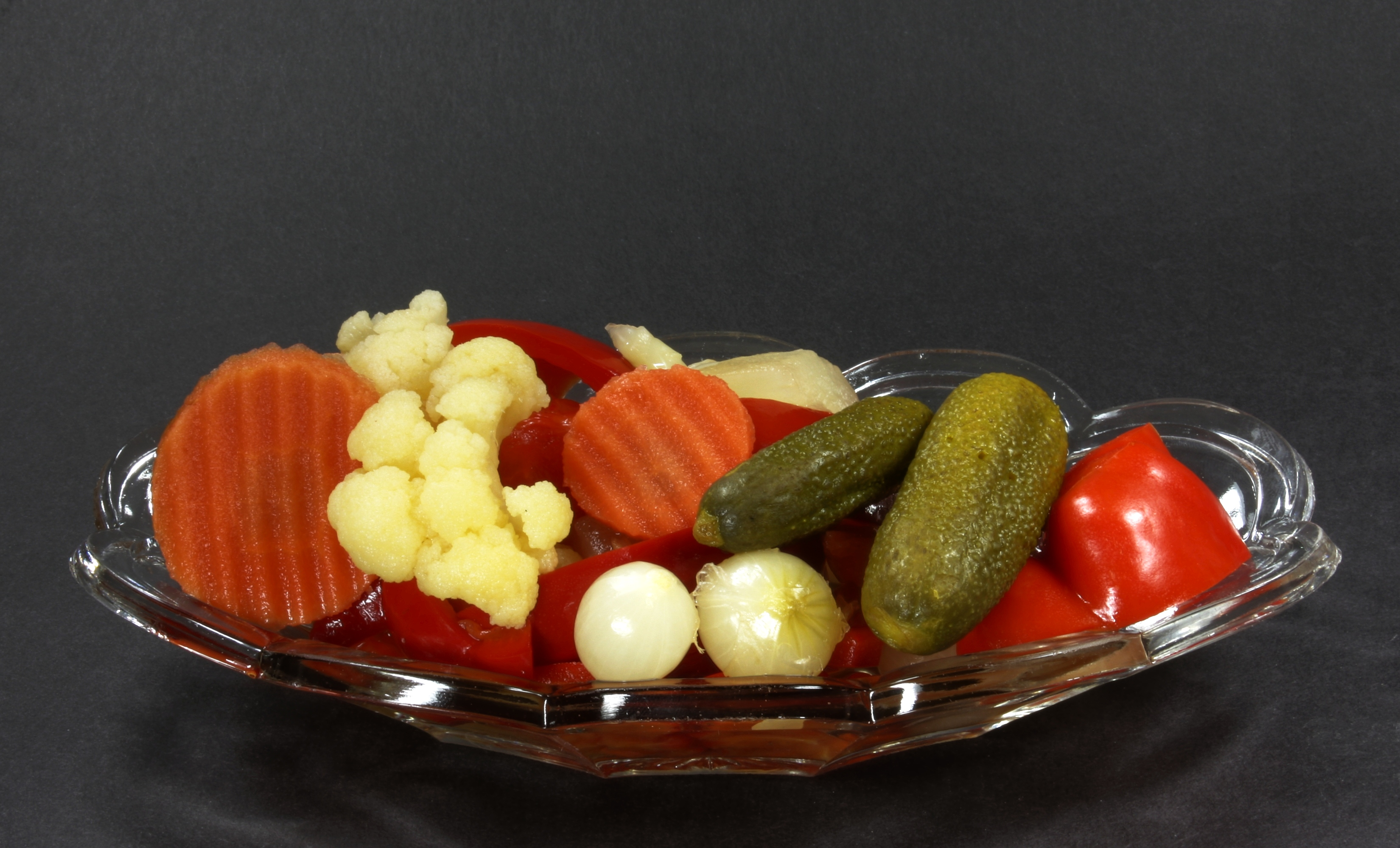
Zimnica

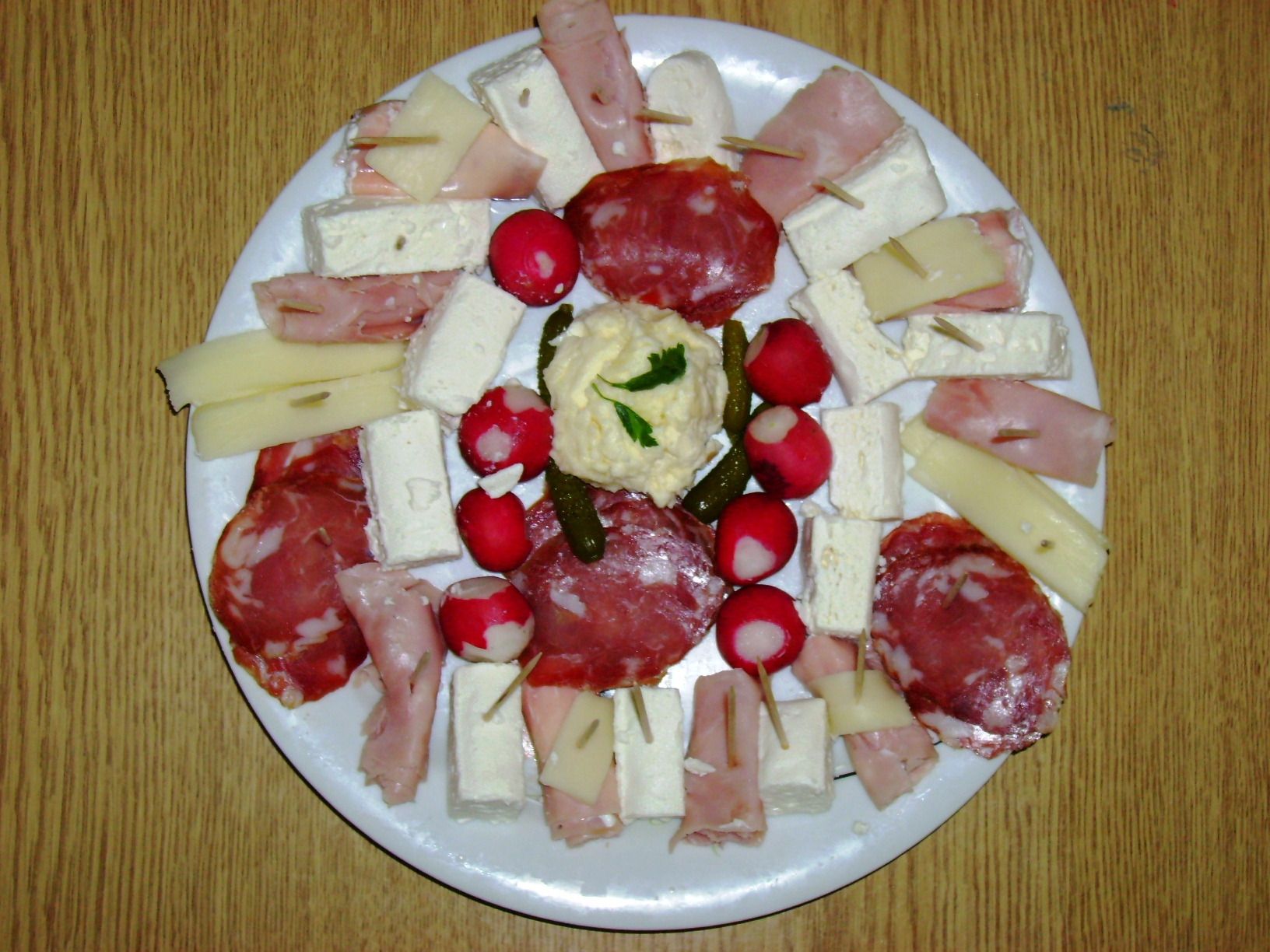
Meze

== Dishes ==
The main course is most commonly a meat dish. Besides roštilj (barbecue) which is very popular, braising, stewing, and roasting in an oven are the most common cooking methods.

=== Soups ===
Soups are eaten as an entrée at almost every lunch. They are considered to be very important for good health. There are two types of soups in Serbian cuisine: thin soups called supa, and thicker soups with roux or eggs called čorba. The most common ones are simple pottages made of beef, offal or poultry with added noodles. Lamb, veal, and fish soups are considered delicacies.

Type	Image	Notes
Consommé (Domaća supa/Домаћа супа)		A simple chicken or beef soup with noodles or dumplings. The most common entrée in home cooking.
Veal soup (Teleća čorba/Телећа чорба)		Soup with veal (calve) meat.
Lamb soup (Jagnjeća čorba/Јагњећа чорба)		Soup with lamb meat.
Fisherman's soup (Riblja čorba/Рибља чорба)		A paprika-spiced fish soup, common in the Pannonian region.
Green soup (Čorba od zelja/Чорба од зеља)		Soup with green salad, carrots, celery, onion, garlic, potatoes, oil, salt, pepper, bay leaves, vegetable or chicken broth, parsley.
Tomato soup (Paradajz čorba/Парадајз чорба)		Soup with tomato, oil, salt, pasta, parsley, in its ordinary form, and also with red onion, carrots, garlic and bay leaves if extended. Eaten as light lunch, appetizer or fast dinner.
Cauliflower soup (Čorba od karfiola/Чорба од карфиола)		Soup with cauliflower.
Egg drop soup (Supa s jajima, supa s dronjcima/Супа с јајима, супа с дроњцима)		

=== Roštilj (barbecue) ===
Grilling is very popular in Serbia. Grilled meats are the primary main course dishes offered in restaurants. They are commonly served as mixed grill on large oval plates. They are often also eaten as fast food. The city of Leskovac is especially famous for their barbecue.

Ćevapi are mentioned in former Yugoslavia from 1850s onward. The fast food industry developed in the Ottoman Empire from Istanbul to the northwestern frontier (Rumelia), with food industry centers such as Edirne, Thessaloniki, Skopje, Bitola, Sofia, Niš and Leskovac. The quick-prepared meat dishes spread from southern Serbia to Belgrade and further. Leskovac has a long history of grill shops. Belgrade saw an influx of migrants from southern Serbia, including Leskovac, who brought the Leskovac grill dishes, including Ćevapi, Pljeskavica, Mućkalica, and others, which became the best-selling mass-produced food. In the Interwar period, helped through Serbian officials stationed west of Serbia, Serbian cuisine spread.

Type	Image	Notes
Rotisserie (Pečenje/Печење)		A whole pig or lamb roasted and rotated on a rod horizontally over fire.
Pljeskavica (Пљескавица)		Meat patty, usually a mixture of pork, beef and lamb, spiced, grilled and served with onion, on plate or in bread (somun or lepinje). There are variants, such as Leskovačka (spicy, with cheese and onion); gurmanska (mixed with peppers, bacon, cheese such as kačkavalj, onion); punjena (very filled with cheese); Hajdučka (beef with smoked bacon). One of the most popular meat dishes and a national dish. Also called "Serbian hamburger".
Ćevapi, Ćevapčići (Ћевапи)		Ground pork or beef meat sticks. One of the most popular meat dishes and a national dish.
Vešalica (Вешалица)		Grilled tenderized, lean pork loin strips. Variants are Bela Vešalica (plain, seasoned white pork loin); Dimljena Vešalica (smoked pork loin); Punjena Vešalica (stuffed with cheese, ham, or bacon); Rolovana (rolled in bacon); and Punjena Bela, etc.
Ražnjići (Shashlik) (Ражњићи)		Chunks of meat (pileći–chicken, svinjski–pork, etc.) or vegetables grilled on skewers. Variants include rolovani (chicken meat rolled with bacon).
Mešano meso (mixed meat)		Traditional mix of meats.
Ćulbastija		Pork
Leskovački uštipci		A specialty of Leskovac.
Kobasice (sausages) (Кобасице)		Various sausages, usually with spices (see sausages list)

=== Pan-fried meat ===
Type	Image	Notes
Bifteki
Užički medaljoni
Wiener schnitzel (Bečka šnicla/Бечка шницла)		Breaded cutlet of veal or pork fried in pan.
Karadjordje's steak (Karađorđeva šnicla/Карађорђева шницла)		A breaded rolled steak stuffed with kajmak, sliced ham and cheese.

=== Cooked meat ===
Type	Image	Notes
Meatballs in tomato sauce (Ćufte u paradajz sosu)		Meatballs in tomato sauce, also with pasta.

=== Stews and casseroles ===
Type	Image	Notes
Goulash (Gulaš/Гулаш)		A paprika-spiced meat stew originating in Hungary that is popular throughout Central Europe and the Balkans.
Moussaka (Musaka/Мусака)		A mince and potato, zucchini or eggplant casserole, common through the Balkans.
Mućkalica (Мућкалица)		A spicy stew of barbecued meat, tomatoes, and peppers. Typical of southern Serbia.
Sataraš (Сатараш)		A vegetable stew of bell peppers, tomatoes and onions. The variant with eggs is known as Bećarac.
Škembići (Шкембићи)		A tripe stew.
Đuveč (Ђувеч)		A vegetable dish similar to ratatouille. Either stewed or baked as a casserole.
Podvarak (Подварак)		A fresh cabbage with grape vinegar casserole, usually with meat and other vegetables (tomatoes, aubergines, mushrooms, olives, and legumes). Can be made with sauerkraut, but that is not authentic. Black vinegar can be used.
Prebranac (Пребранац)		A bean casserole. Called "tavce gravce" in Macedonia.
Pasulj (bean stew) (Пасуљ)		A bean stew.
Pea stew (Grašak/Грашак)		A pea stew.
Boranija (Боранија)		A green bean stew.
Cooked chickpeas (Kuvana leblebija)		A chickpea stew.

=== Cooked, fried or stuffed vegetables ===
Type	Image	Notes
Sarma (Сарма)		Cabbage, chard or vine leaves, stuffed with rice and minced meat. In northern Serbia, cabbage leaves are also used.
Stuffed peppers (Punjene paprike/Пуњене паприке)		Peppers stuffed with rice and minced meat.
Stuffed aubergine (Punjeni patlidžani)		Aubergines stuffed with minced meat and cheese.
Stuffed zucchini (Punjene tikvice/Пуњене тиквице)		Zucchini stuffed with rice and minced meat.
Fried zucchini Pohovana tikvica		Breaded zucchini fried in pan.

=== Other ===
Type	Image	Notes
Sač, Vršnjik (Сач, Вршњик)		Various meat and vegetables cooked/baked under a traditional metal or ceramic lid (sač) covered in coal.
Kavurma (Кавурма)		Pig intestines, not to be confused with Turkish kavurma.
Flekice sa kupusom		Pasta with cabbage, traditional dish in Vojvodina.
Rinflajš (Ринфлајш)		A boiled beef dish from Vojvodina. Similar to Tafelspitz.
Paprikaš (Паприкаш)		Chicken, paprika-induced through roux, popular in Hungary and the Balkans.
Pilav		
Njoke (Gnocchi)		

=== Bread ===
Bread is a staple of Serbian meals, and it is often treated almost ritually. A traditional Serbian welcoming is to offer the guest with bread and salt; bread also plays an important role in religious rituals. Many Serbs believe that it is sinful to throw away bread regardless of how old it is. Although pasta, rice, potato, and similar side dishes did enter the everyday cuisine over time, many Serbs still eat bread with meals.

In most bakeries and shops, white wheat bread loaves (typically 0.5 kg) are sold. In modern times, black bread and various Graham bread variations have regained popularity. In many rural households, bread is still baked in cast-iron ovens, usually in bigger loaves.

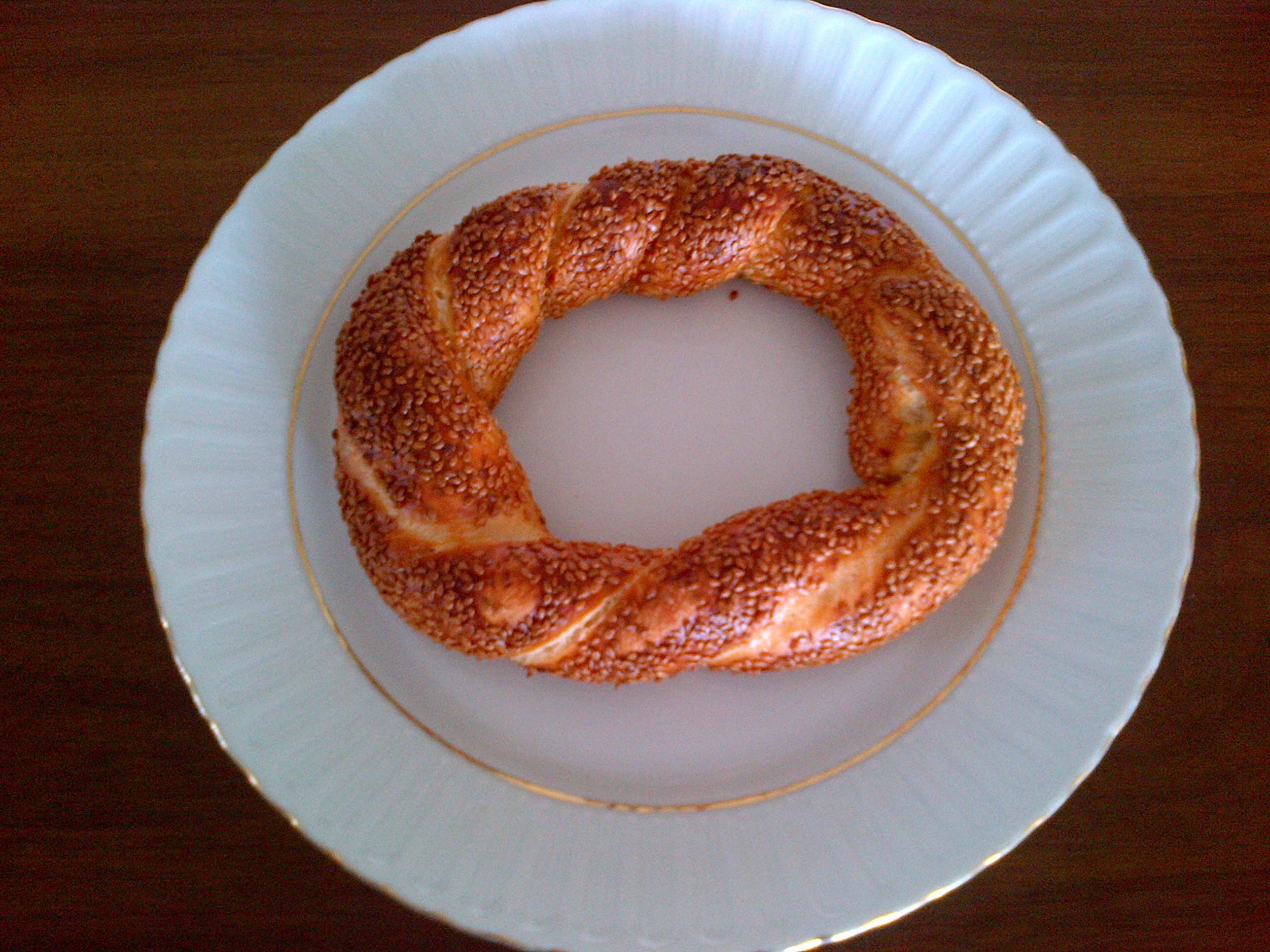
Đevrek

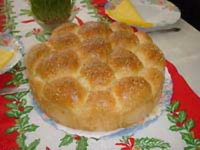
Soda bread

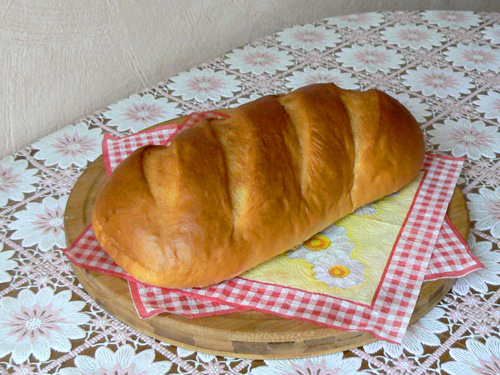
Bread

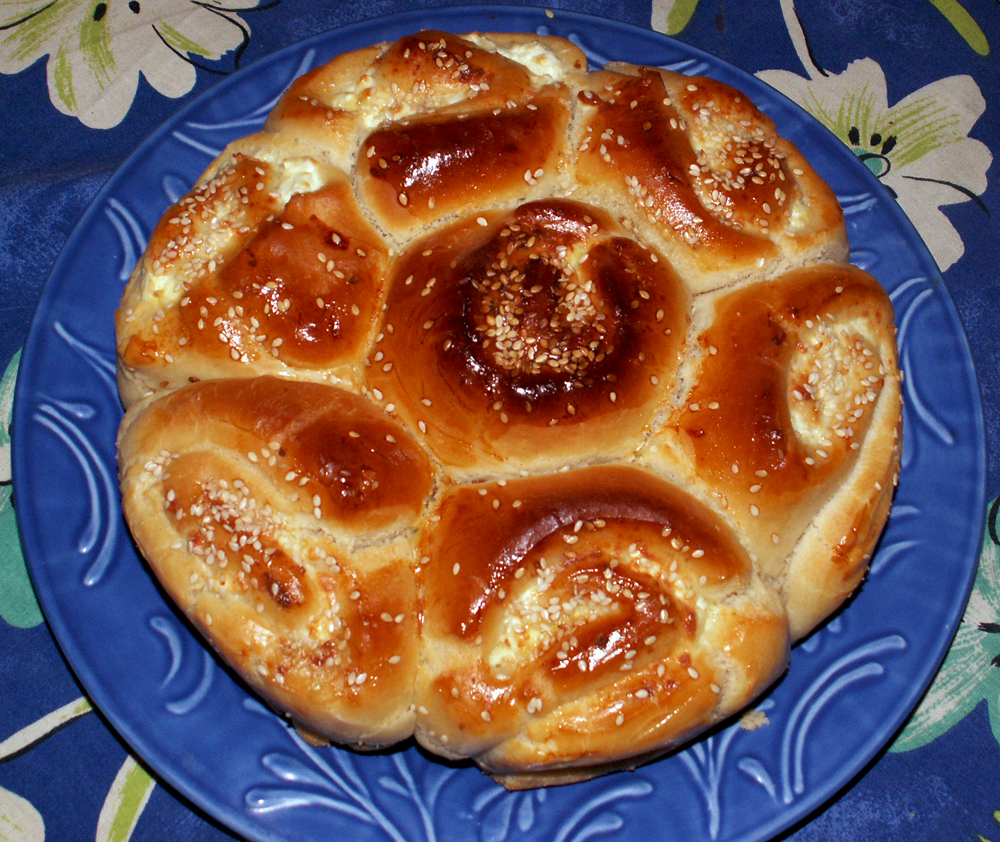
Pogača

=== Salads ===
In Serbia, salads are eaten as a side dish with the main course. The simplest of salads consist of sliced lettuce, cabbage, tomato, cucumber or carrot, olives with oil, vinegar, salt, and spices.

Type	Image	Description
Serbian salad (Srpska salata/Српска салата)		Diced tomatoes, cucumbers, and onions with a simple dressing of oil and vinegar.
Shopska salad (Šopska salata/Шопска салата)		Similar to the above Serbian salad, but topped with white cheese.
Greek salad (Grčka salata/Грчка салата)		Diced tomatoes, cucumbers and onions, topped with olives and feta cheese, and dressed with olive oil. Originally from Greece, but quite popular in Serbia.
Cabbage salad (Kupus salata/Купус салата)		Shredded cabbage with a vinegar dressing.
Zimnica, Turšija (Зимница, Туршија)		Pickled vegetables.
Russian salad (Ruska salata/Руска салата)		Diced boiled potatoes, carrots, pickles, green peas, eggs and ham, dressed with mayonnaise.
Tarator/Tzatziki (Таратор)		Yogurt with cucumber.
Moravska salata (Моравска салата)		Combination of leeks, tomatoes, roasted peppers, hot peppers, garlic, salt, and oil. Originated in the areas of Niš and Leskovac (southeastern Serbia).
Belolučene paprike		Combination of roasted bell peppers with garlic, vinegar, salt, oil, and parsley.

=== Relishes ===
Ajvar (Ајвар)	A pepper-based condiment made from red bell peppers. It can be mild or spicy.
Ljutenica (Љутеница)	A spicy relish. Ingredients include peppers, carrots, eggplant, onion, garlic and tomatoes. It can be smooth or with chunks. Spicier than ajvar. However, different regions and countries have substantially different interpretations of these relishes.
Pinđur (Пинђур)	Similar to ajvar but generally made with eggplant. In some regions the words are used interchangeably.
Urnebes (Урнебес)	A spread made predominantly with crushed white cheese, minced garlic and dry red peppers.

== Dairy products ==
Dairy products are an important part of the Serbian diet. Fermented products such as buttermilk and soured milk (Kiselo mleko), kajmak, yogurt, strained yogurt, and smetana/pavlaka are common breakfast foods, consumed daily. White cheeses (sir), are much more common in Serbia than yellow cheeses. There are numerous varieties, some of which have been awarded for their quality, such as the white cheese with walnuts from Babine, which won the 2012 "best autochtonic cheese" award. Serbian Pule cheese, made from donkey milk, is the most expensive cheese in the world. Although less common, several yellow cheese are locally produced.

== Meat products ==
Traditional Serbian meat products are simple ham, bacon, dry ribs, and a kind of pork rinds called čvarci. They are usually produced every autumn or in early winter, during an event called svinjokolj, where pigs are slaughtered and meat is preserved for the winter. Cured meats, bacon, salo, čvarci, sausages (kobasice) such as krvavica, and kulen are produced. Offal and cheaper cuts of meat are utilized as well, and made into processed products such as švargla. Many meat products have attained protected designation of origin (OGP).

- Smoked ham (šunka)
- Pastrma, heavily seasoned, air-dried cured beef meat.
- Pečenica
- Buđola (Bresaola), air-dried, salted meat.
- Užice proscuitto (Užička pršuta), smoked beef, pork or mutton from Užice. (OGP)
- Zlatibor proscuitto (zlatiborska pršuta), smoked pork ham, from Zlatibor.
- Zlatibor beef proscuitto, beef meat, from Zlatibor.
- Sjenica proscuitto, sheep meat, from Sjenica.
- Salt-cured pork (Slanina/Salo)
  - Užice bacon (užička slanina), from Užice (OGP).
- Dry ribs
- Čvarci, pork rinds
  - Duvan čvarci
    - Valjevo duvan čvarci (valjevski duvan čvarci), from Valjevo (OGP).

Various kinds of sausages and similar more complex meat products were created under Austrian influence in Vojvodina. They include:

- Sausage (kobasica)
  - Srem sausage (sremska domaća kobasica), from Srem (OGP).
  - Srem salami (sremska salama), from Srem (OGP).
  - Požarevac sausage (požarevačka kobasica), from Požarevac (OGP).
  - Petrovac sausage (petrovačka kobasica), from Petrovac (OGP).
  - Srpska kobasica (Serbian sausage)
  - Srem kulen, from Srem (OGP).
  - Sujuk (Sudžuk), dry sausage of spicy minced meat.
    - Sjenica sujuk (Sjenički sudžuk) from Sjenica.
- (Lemeški kulen)
- (Peglana kobasica)
- Blood sausage (krvavice)
- Head cheese (švargla)
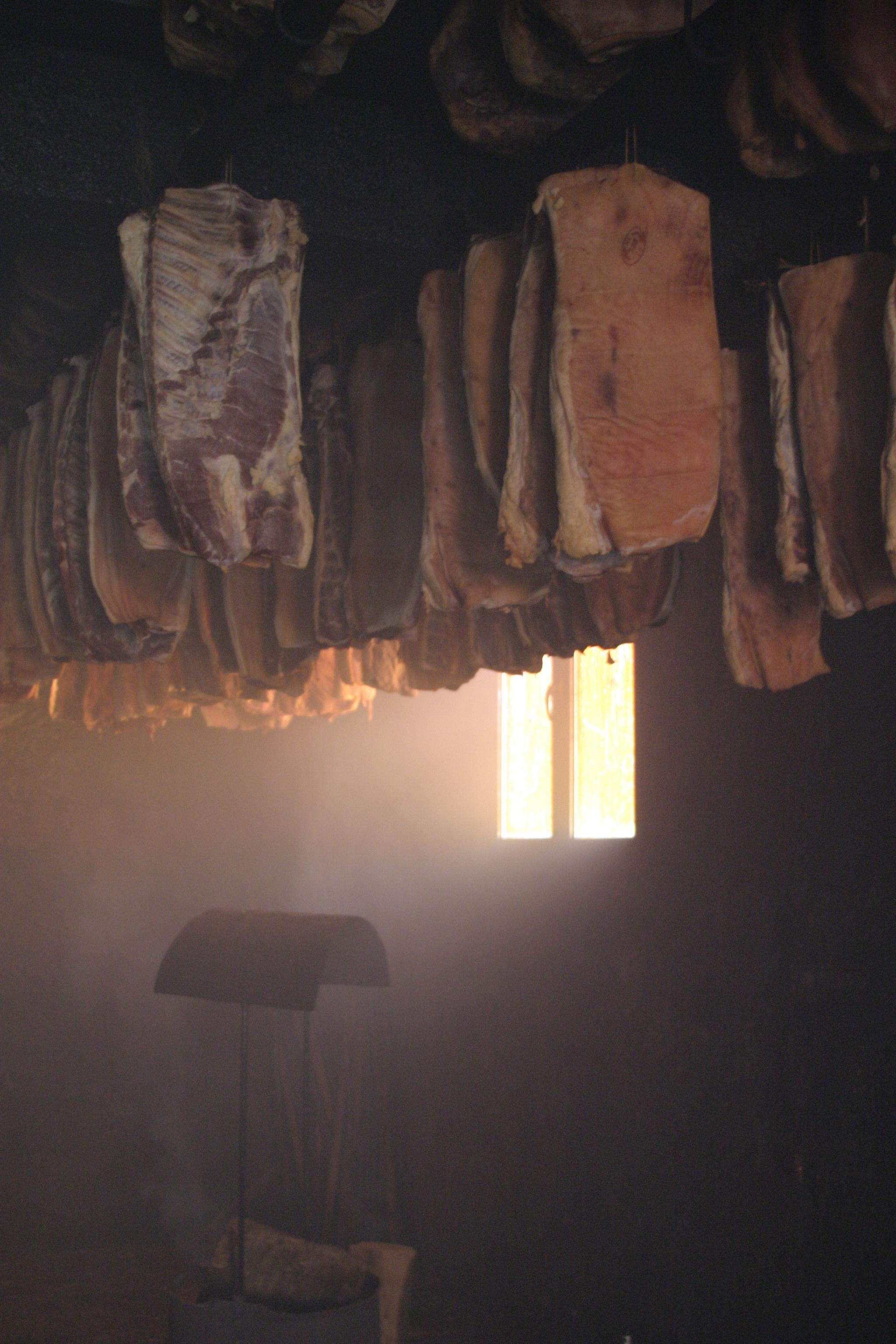
Smoked meat

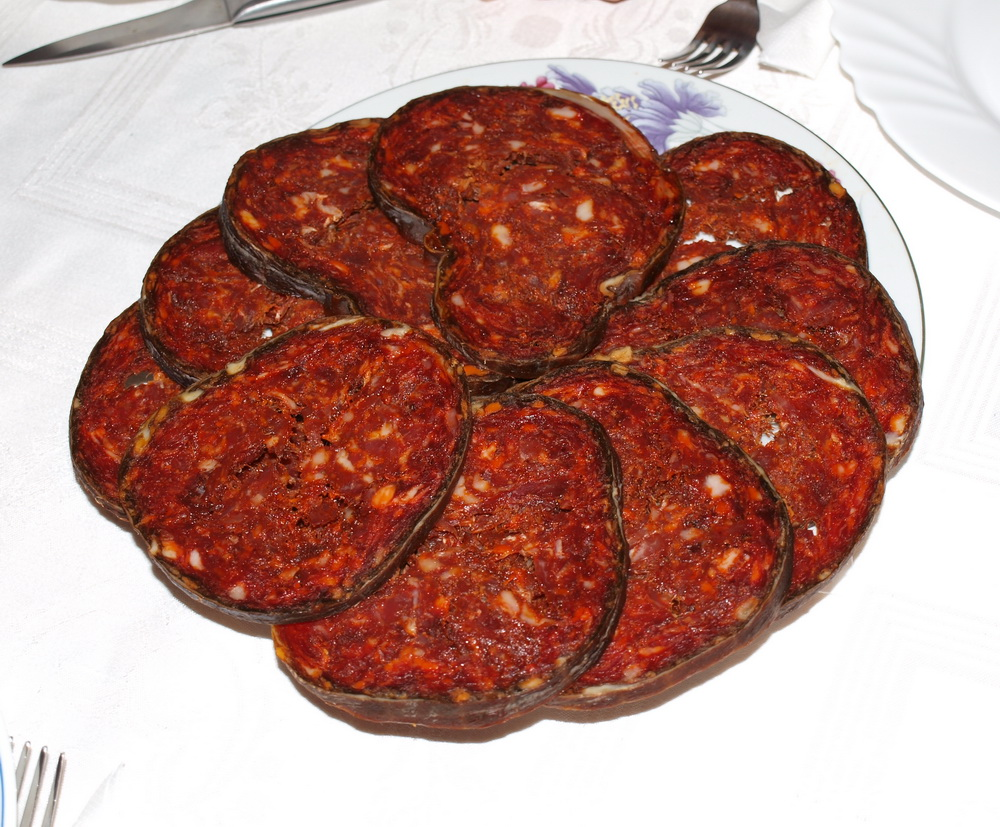
Srem kulen

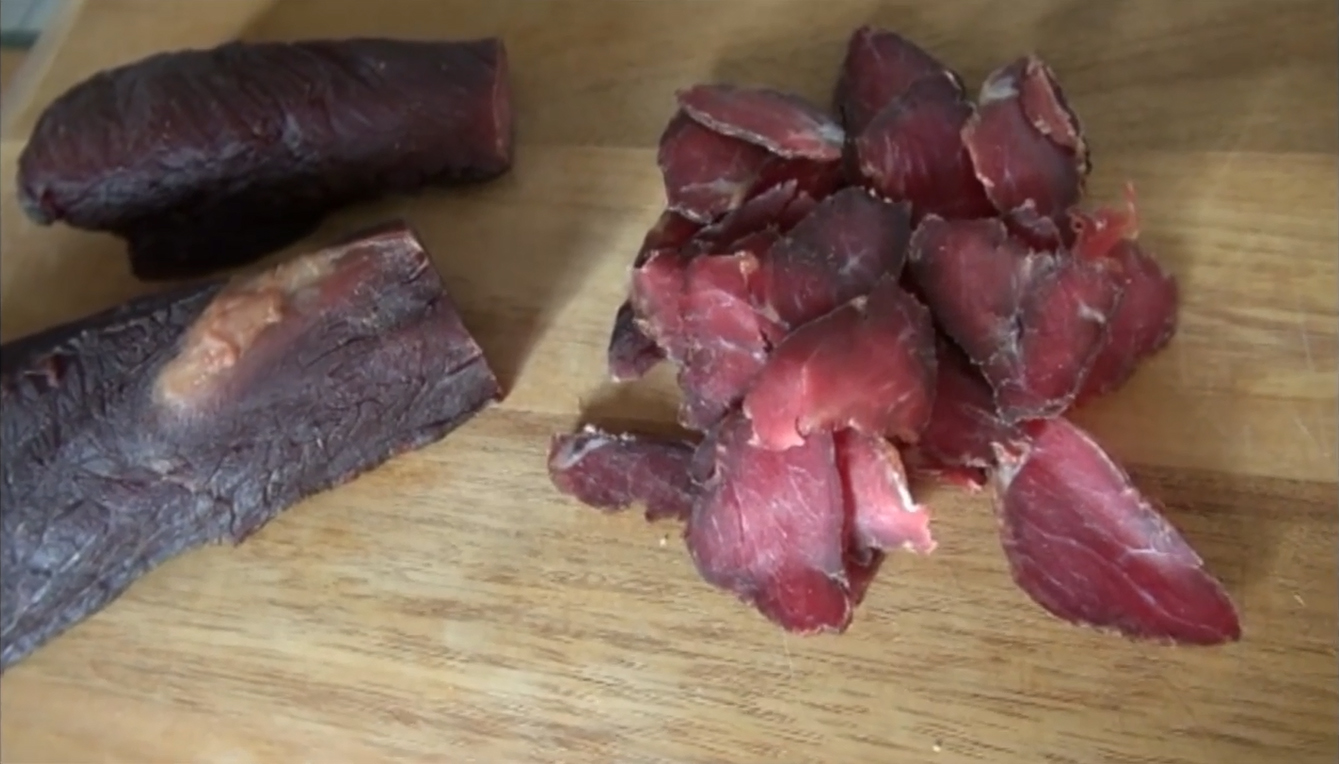
Cured meat

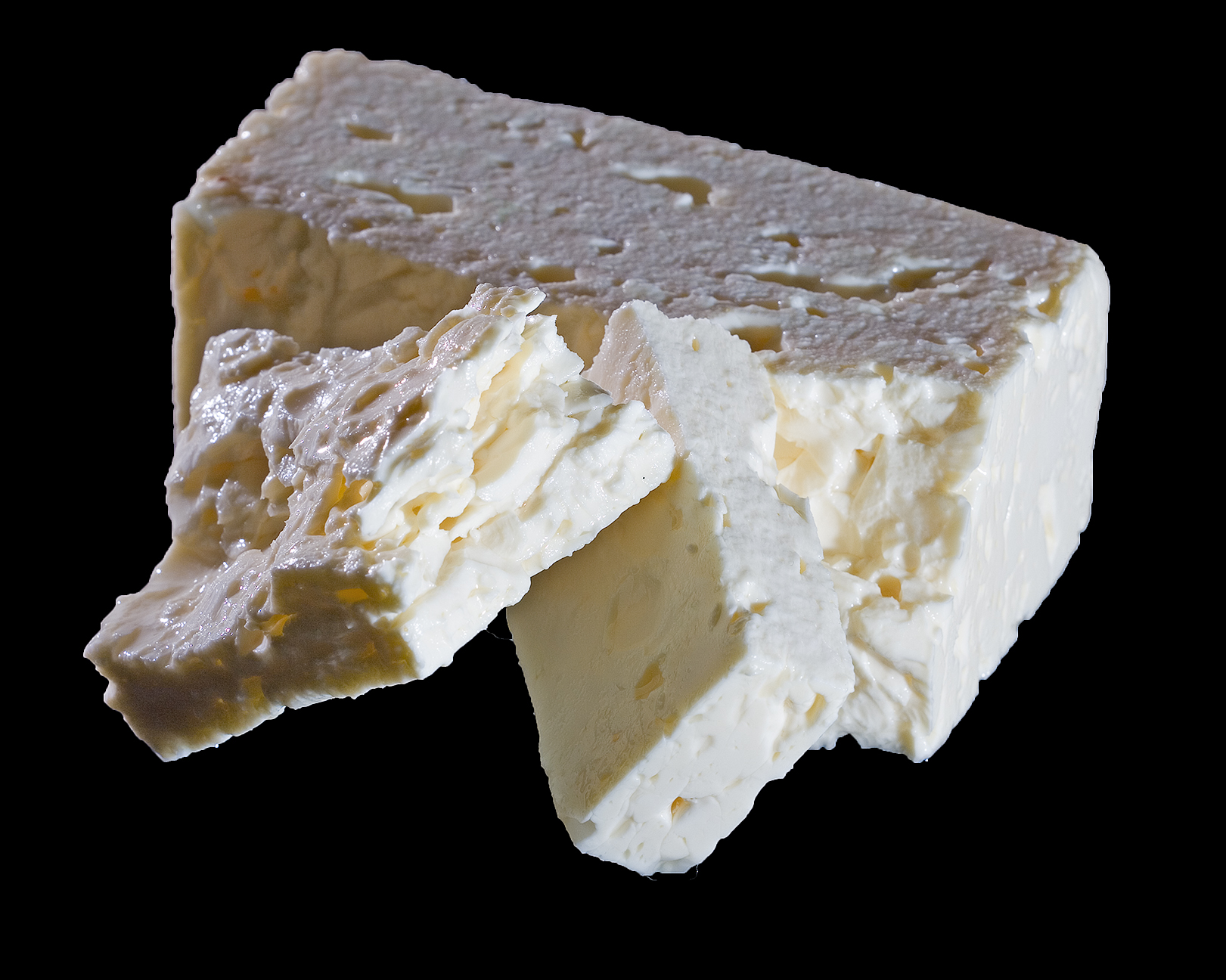
Feta

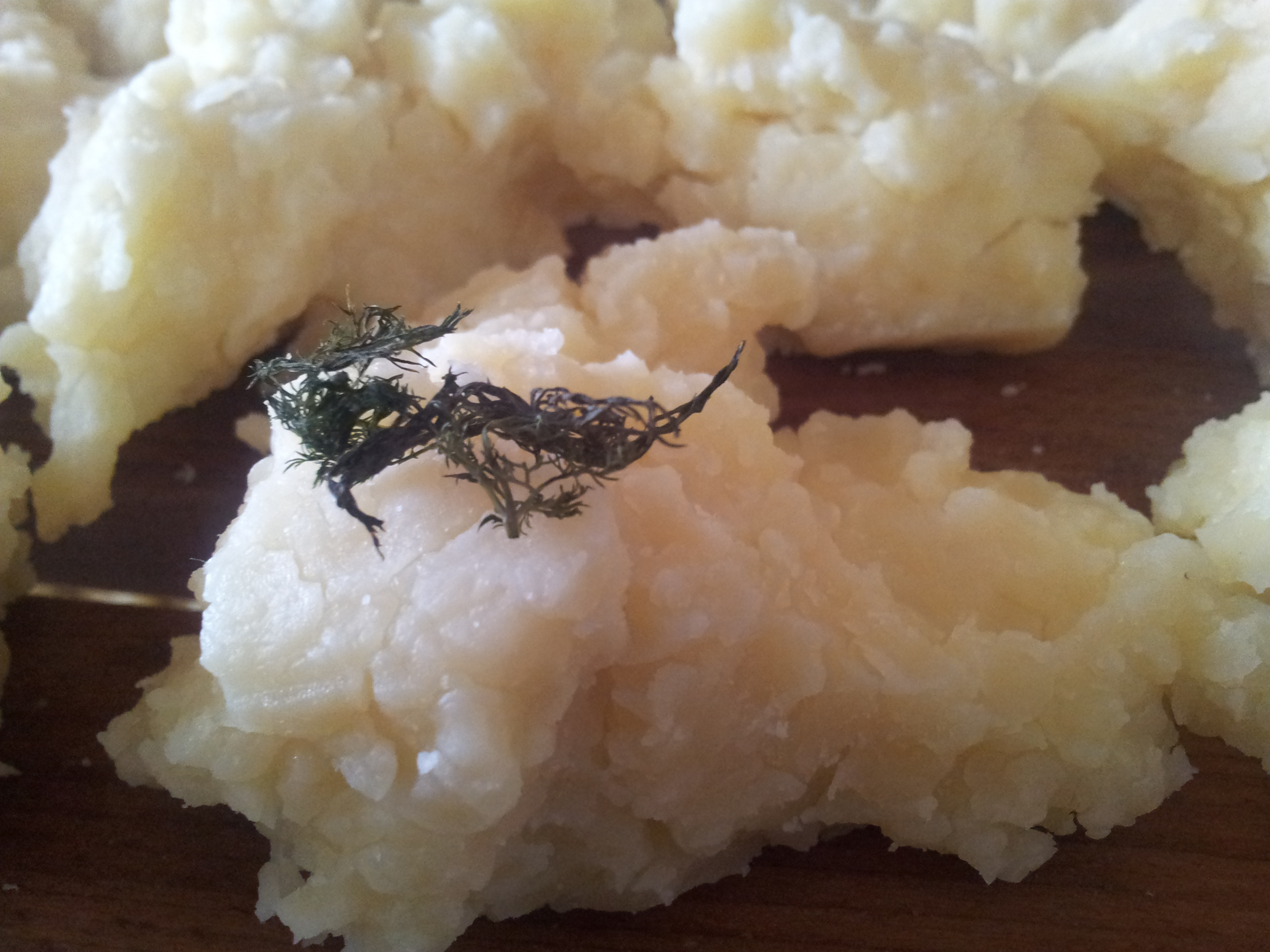
Šar cheese

== Savory pies ==
Pies are very popular in Serbia. They are eaten either for breakfast, dinner, or as a snack. They are most commonly made with thin layers of phyllo dough. There are several methods of preparation and numerous types of fillings, both sweet and savory. Serbian pies are usually named after either the preparation method or the filling.

↓ Filling	Form →	Ruffled phyllo	Rolled phyllo	Layered phyllo	Rolled dough
↓ Filling	↓ Serbian name →	Бурек	Савијача		Штрудла
white cheese	Пита са сиром/Сирница	✓	✓		
white cheese and eggs	Гибаница		✓	Gibanica	✓
meat	Пита с месом	✓	✓		
potatoes	Пита с кромпиром/Кромпируша	✓	✓		
spinach, greens	Пита са зељем/Зељаница	✓	✓		
mushrooms	Пита с печуркама	✓		✓	
sour cherries	Пита са вишњама	✓	✓		✓
apples	Пита с јабукама	✓	✓		✓
pumpkin	Пита с бундевом/Бундевара		✓		✓
poppy seeds	Штрудла с маком/Маковњача				✓
walnuts	Штрудла са орасима/Орасница		✓	Česnica (in Vojvodina)	✓
no filling		✓			

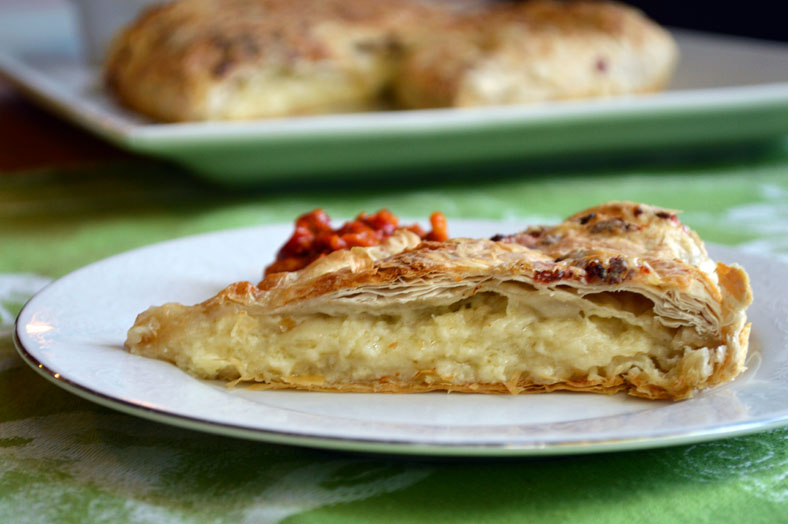
Gibanica

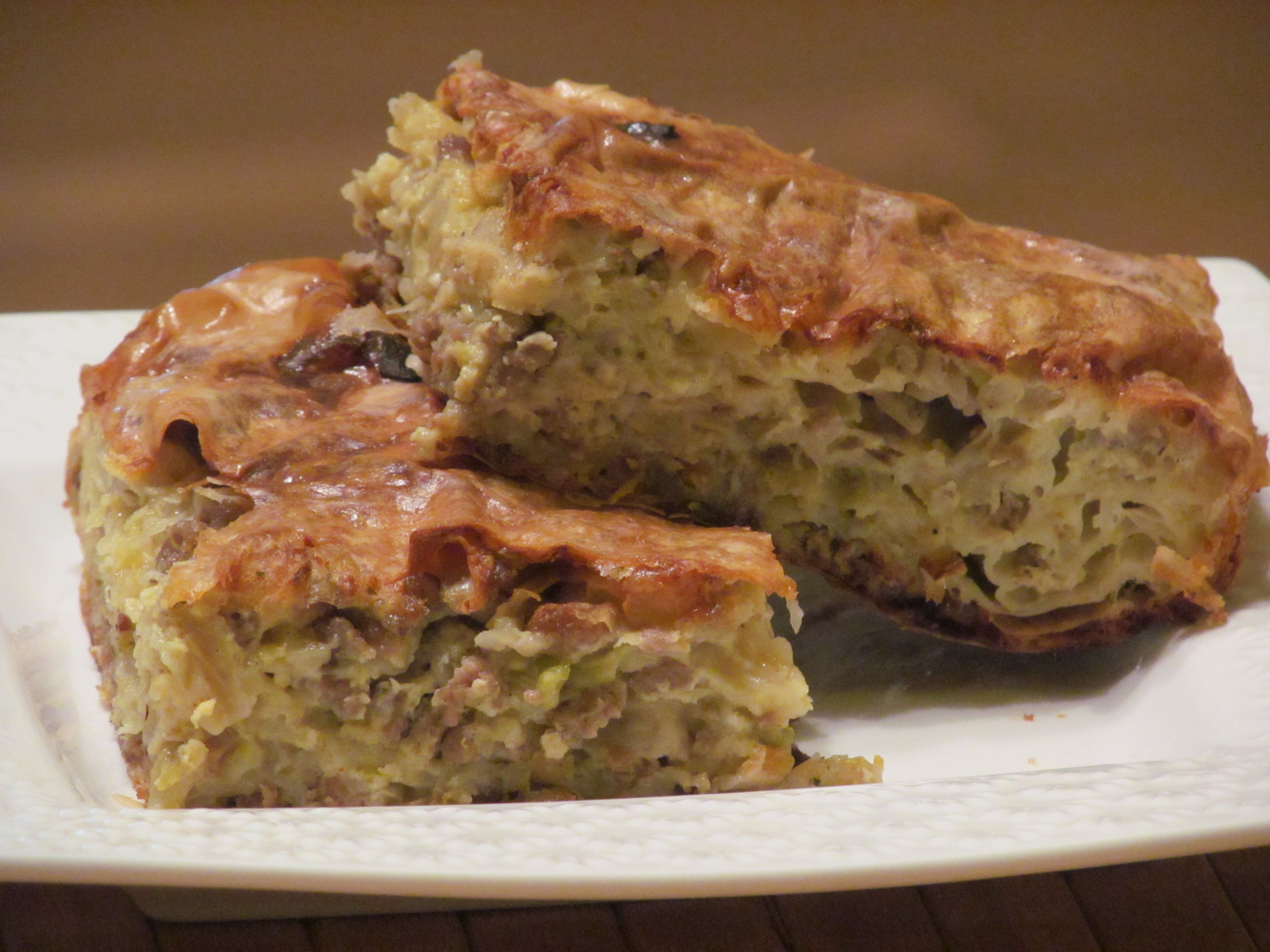
Meat pie

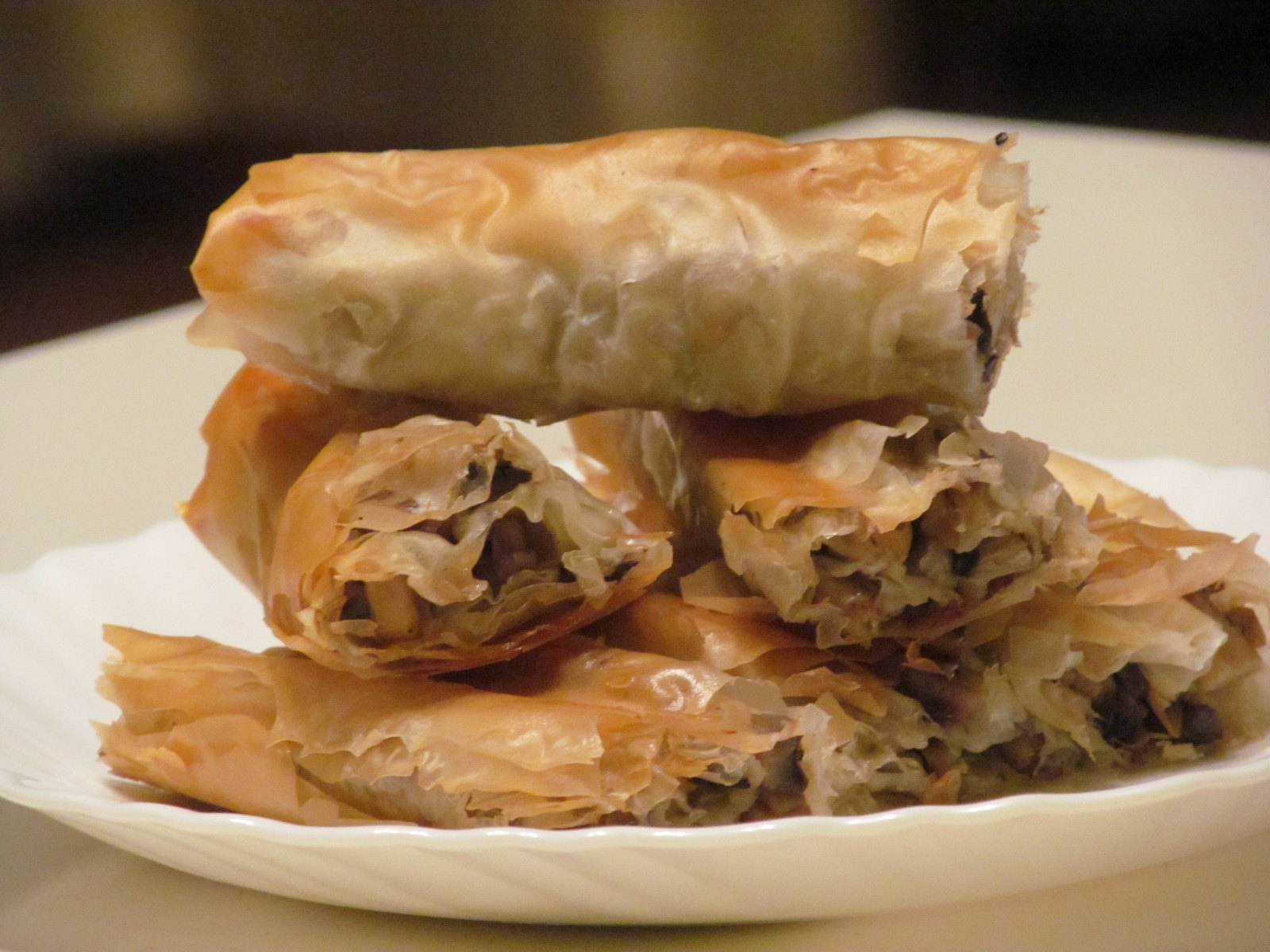
Mushroom pie

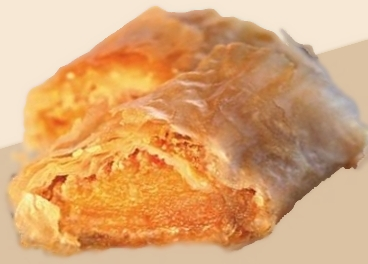
Pumpkin pie

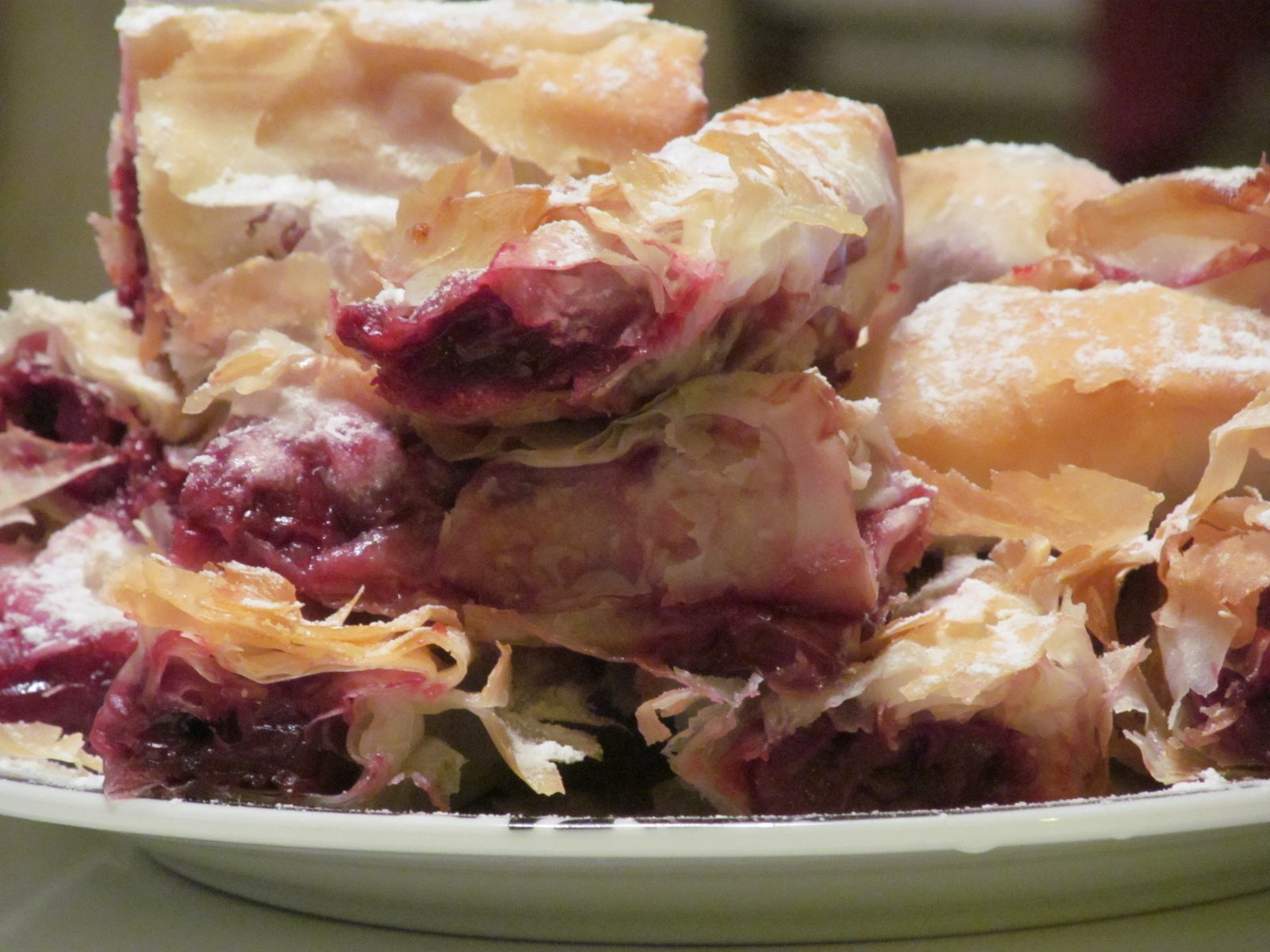
Cherry pie

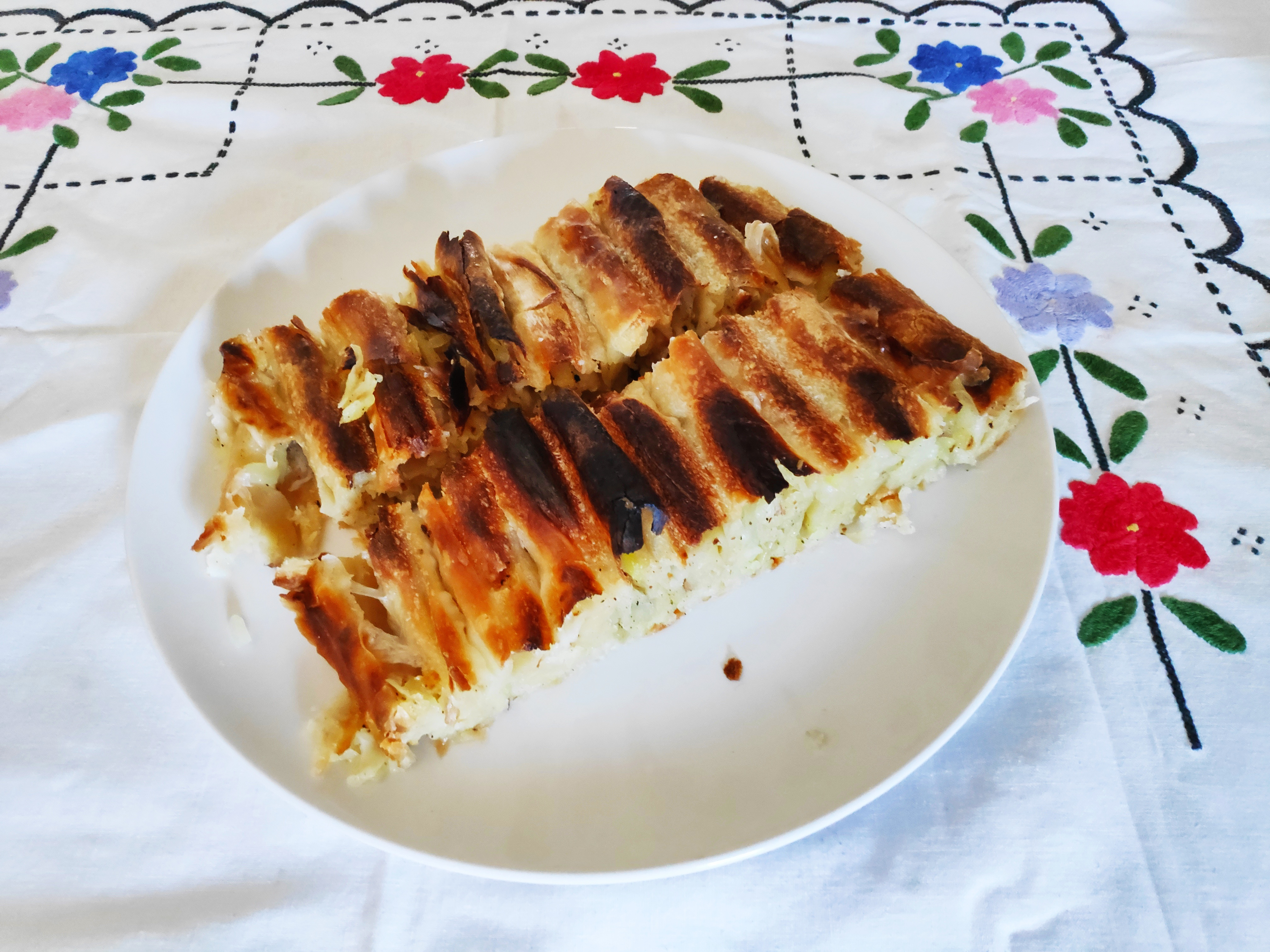
Vanilla filling pie

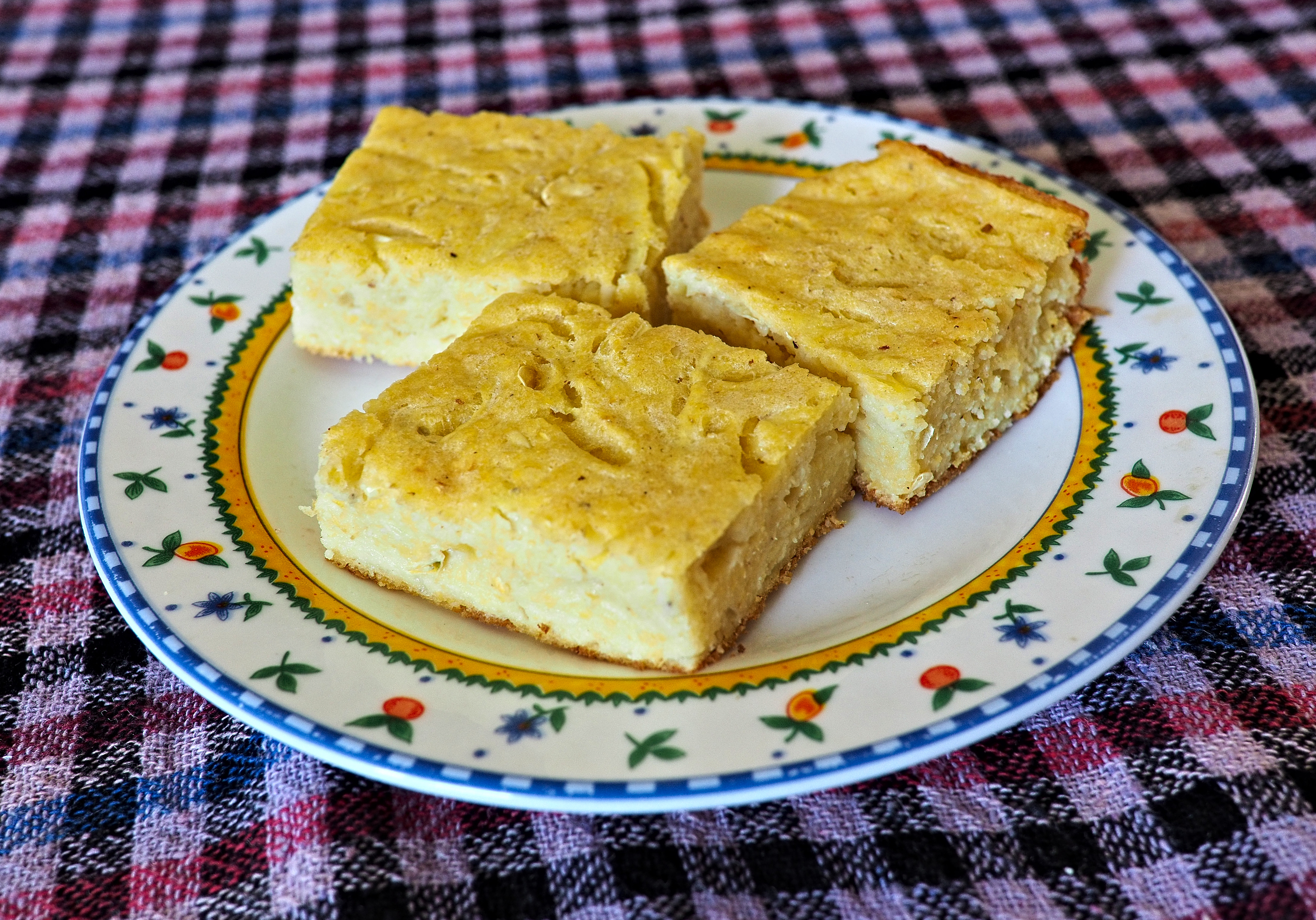
Egg pie (jaruša)

== Sweets and desserts ==
Sweets are served at the end of meals. Sweets and desserts served in Serbia typically include both Middle Eastern and European ones, as well as some authentically Serbian ones. Besides those mentioned here, pies with sweet fruit fillings are also common.

Type	Image	Description
Filo pastry
Strudel (Štrudla/штрудла)		Layered pastry with a filling that is usually sweet, but savoury fillings are also common.
Baklava (Баклава)		Sweet pastry made from layers of phyllo dough, filled with chopped nuts and sweetened with syrup or honey.
Bundevara, Tikvenik (Бундевара, тиквеник)		Sweet pastry made of rolled phyllo, with sweetened grated pumpkin pulp.
Cooked or preserved fruit
Kompot (Компот)		A non-alcoholic sweet beverage that may be served hot or cold. It is obtained by cooking fruit in a large volume of water, together with sugar or raisins as additional sweeteners.
Kitnikes (quince cheese) (Китникес)		A sweet, thick jelly made of the pulp of the quince fruit.
Slatko (Слатко)		A fruit preserve. Part of welcoming tradition.
Cake dessert
Bajadera (Бајадера)		A layered nougat with almonds, hazelnuts or walnuts.
Plazma cake (Plazma torta/Плазма торта)		A layered cake with Plazma biscuit as the primary ingredient.
Sand cake (Pesak torta)		Easily made creamy layered cake with ground biscuits, coconut and walnuts.
Moscow cake (Moskva šnit)		Dessert with walnuts, hazelnuts, egg yolk cream, cherries, pineapple. Invented in 1974 by the Hotel Moskva bakery.
Grilijaš cake (Grilijaš torta)		caramel-flavored crunchy cake for celebrations.
Doboš cake (Doboš torta/Добош торта)		A five-layer sponge cake, layered with chocolate buttercream and topped with thin caramel slices.
Krempita (Кремпита)		A chantilly and custard cream cake dessert.
Šampita (Шампита)		A whipped marshmallow-type dessert with fillo dough crust.
Ruske kape ("Russian hats") (Руске капе)		
Reforma cake (Reforma torta/Реформа торта)		A layered cake with chocolate butter-cream filling.
Trileće		Sponge cake topped with caramel.
Vasa's cake (Vasina torta/Васина торта)		A walnut and chocolate cake; amongst the more common Serbian desserts.
Jafa torta		
Lenja pita ("Lazy cake")		Easy-to-make dessert of two layers of biscuit with either fruit-, cheese-, or nut filling between.
Čupavci		A version of Lamington, a soft moist cake dipped in a milky chocolate sauce and rolled in coconut flakes.
Biscuits and cookies
Orasnice (Ораснице)		Walnut cookies.
Piškoti (ladyfingers) (Piškoti/пишкоти)		Thin, light, sweet, crispy cookie.
Vanilice (Ванилице)		Vanilla cookies.
Gurabija (Гурабија)		Shortbread-type biscuit, typically sweetened in honey.
Šape, Šapice		vanilla shortbread cookies.
Medenjaci		A type of gingerbread cookies, with cinnamon, ginger and honey.
Fried dough
Uštipci (Уштипци)		Doughnut-like fried dough balls.
Krofne (Крофне)		Airy doughnuts filled with chocolate or jam.
Mekike		Doughnut-like fried dough.
Tulumbe (Тулумбе)		A fried batter soaked in syrup.
Slatki đevrek		Ring doughnut, less sweet than Turkish version.
Other
Walnut roll (Štrudla sa Orasima, Rolat)		spongy nut roll. Also with marmalade.
Poppy seed roll (Makovnjača, Makova potica)		spongy roll with poppy seeds. Central European specialty.
Palačinke (Палачинке)		crêpes with chocolate, marmalade, nuts, etc.
Knedle with plums (Knedle sa šljivama/Кнедле са шљивама)		Boiled potato-dough dumplings filled with plums; called gomboce in Vojvodina.
Tufahije (Туфахије)		Walnut-stuffed apples stewed in water with sugar.
Ratluk (Ратлук)		Turkish delight.
Halva (Alva/Алва)		Dense flour or nut-based sweet confections.
Šnenokle (floating island)		French-origin dessert popular in Serbia and Croatia.
Kuglof		Cake introduced via Austria. Varieties such as mramorni (marble).
Urmašica		Syrup-drenched pastry of Turkish origin.
Koh		Simple cake with eggs, sugar, milk.

== Ritual food ==
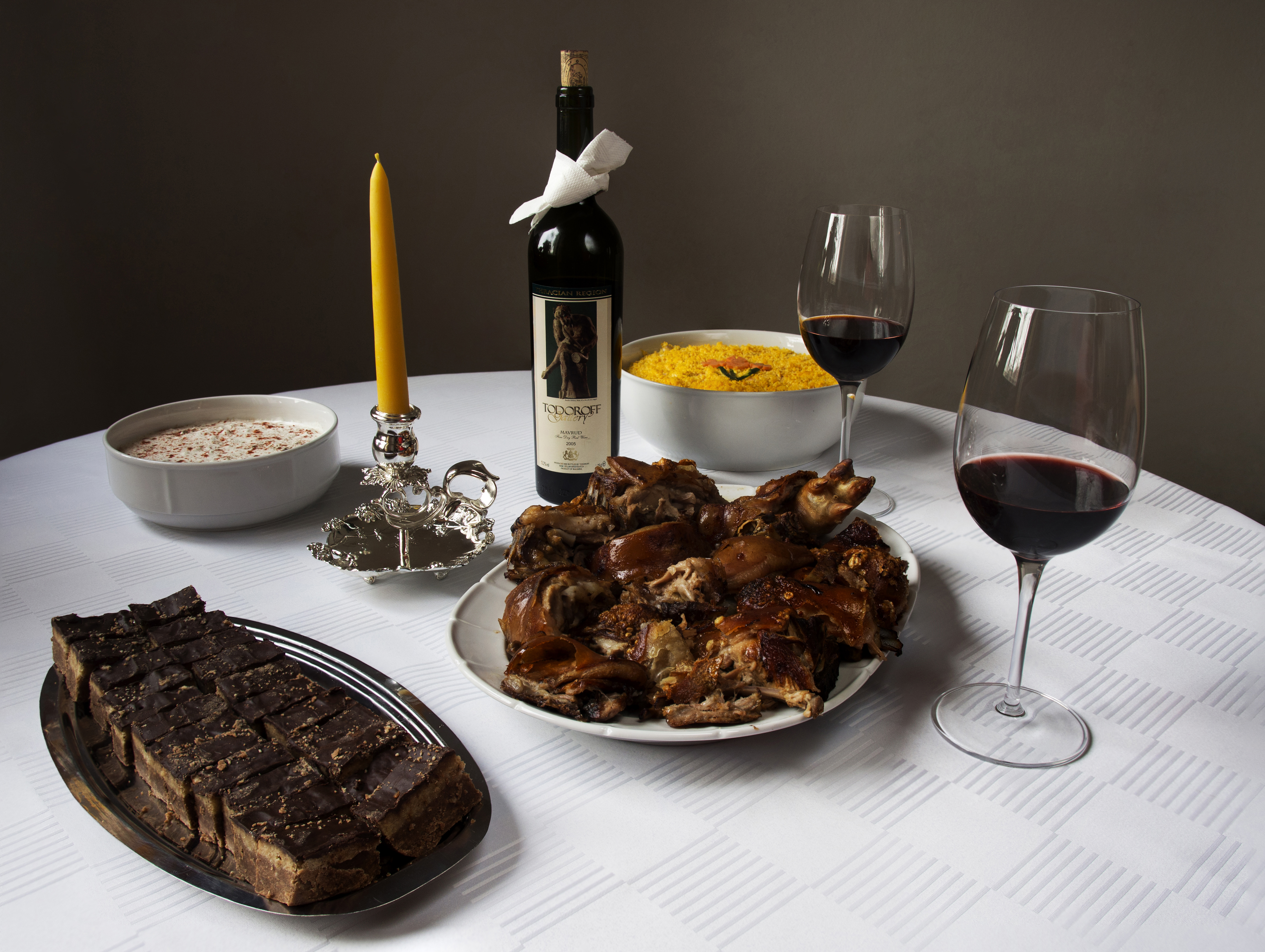
A typical Serbian dinner table at Christmas.

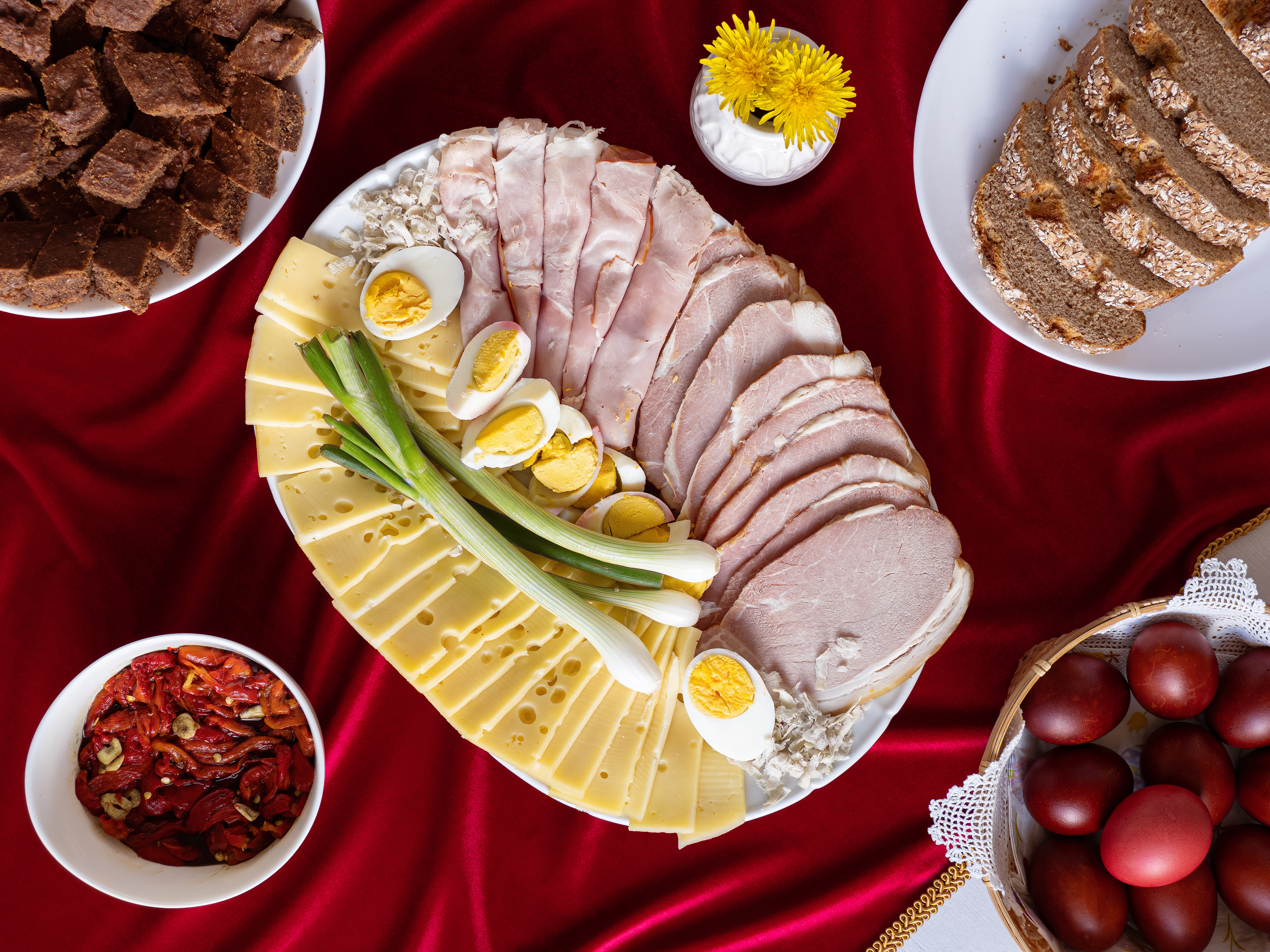
Easter breakfast with Easter eggs, cheese, ham, horseradish, pepper salade with garlic, rye bread and cinnamon cakes

Type	Image	Description
Česnica (Чесница)		Plays a central ritual role in Serbian Orthodox Christmas. A coin is put inside it, and it is then rotated and broken into pieces, and each family member takes one. The one who gets the coin is said to have a lucky and blessed following year.
Koljivo (Кољиво)		Boiled wheat, almonds/walnuts, and tahini—ritual food during slava.
Slavski kolač (Славски колач)		A decorated traditional bread used for Slava feast days.
Podvarak		Vegetarian version used on feast days.

== Drinks ==
=== Non-alcoholic ===
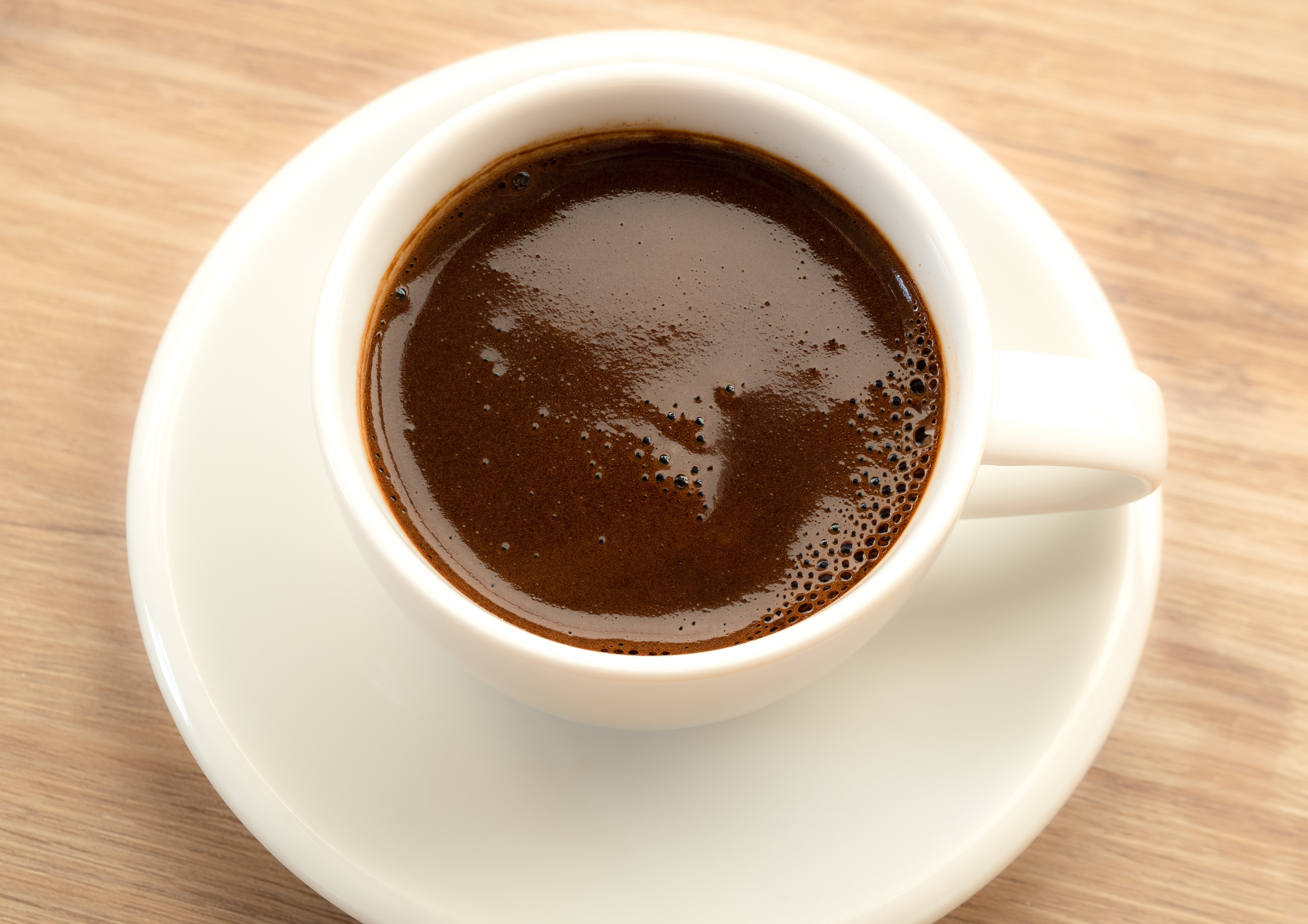
Traditional coffee cooked in dzezva, a first coffeehouse (kafana) in Serbia was opened in 1522 in Belgrade

Domestic coffee (or Serbian coffee) is the most commonly consumed non-alcoholic beverage in Serbia. It is mostly prepared at home, rather than bought in coffee shops, and preferably consumed in the company of friends or family. Slatko, ratluk, and rakija may be served alongside coffee. The majority of the Serbian population starts the day with a cup of coffee in the morning. Herbal teas are consumed as a medication, rather than a beverage. Yogurt and Kefir are commonly consumed dairy beverages. They frequently accompany savory pastries. A beverage made from maize, called boza or kvas, was once popular, but today is rarely consumed.

A number of fruit juice and mineral water brands are produced locally. The Knjaz Miloš mineral water is considered a national brand.

=== Alcoholic ===
==== Rakija ====
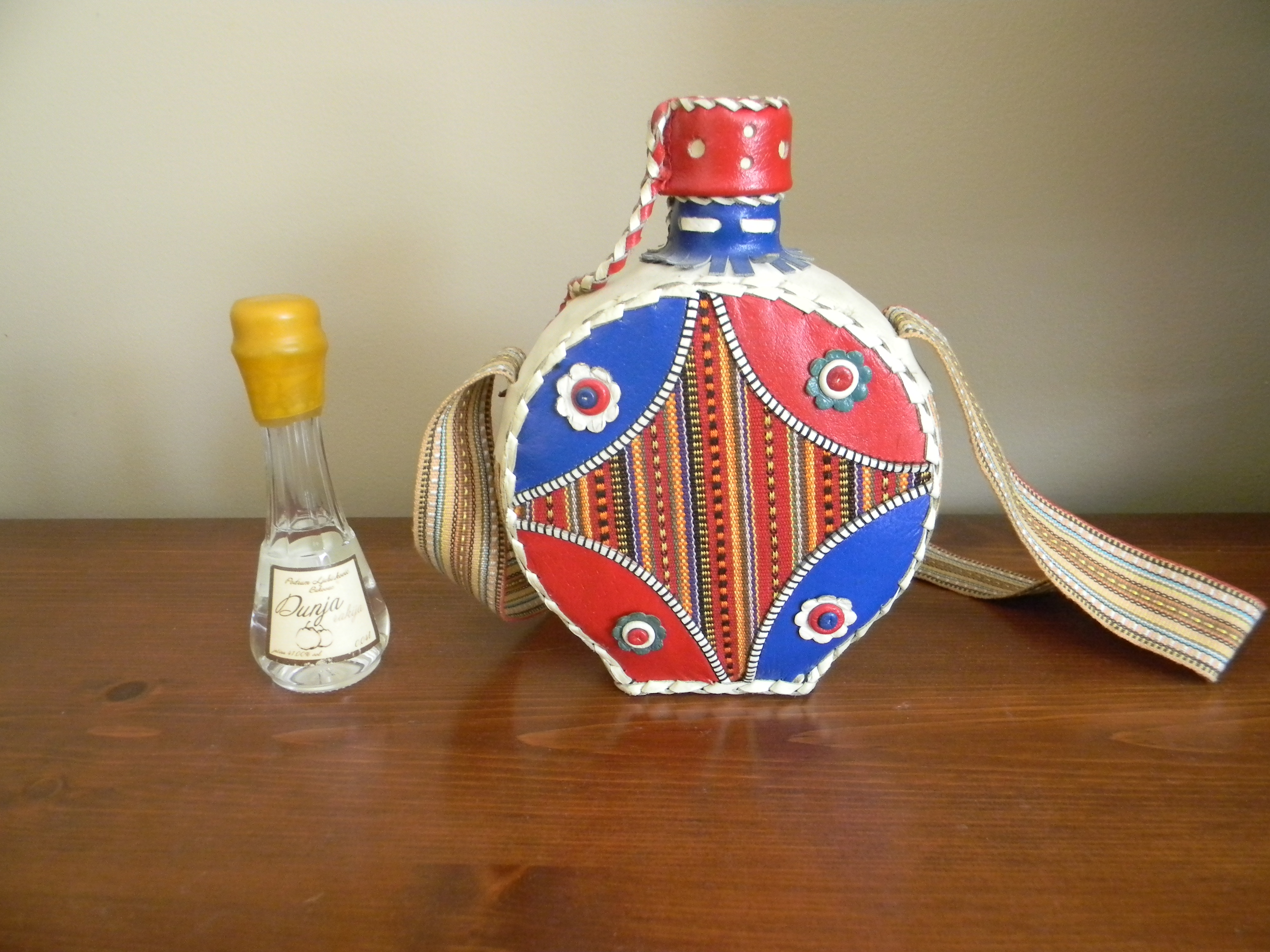
Rakija in a special bottle, as the national drink of Serbia

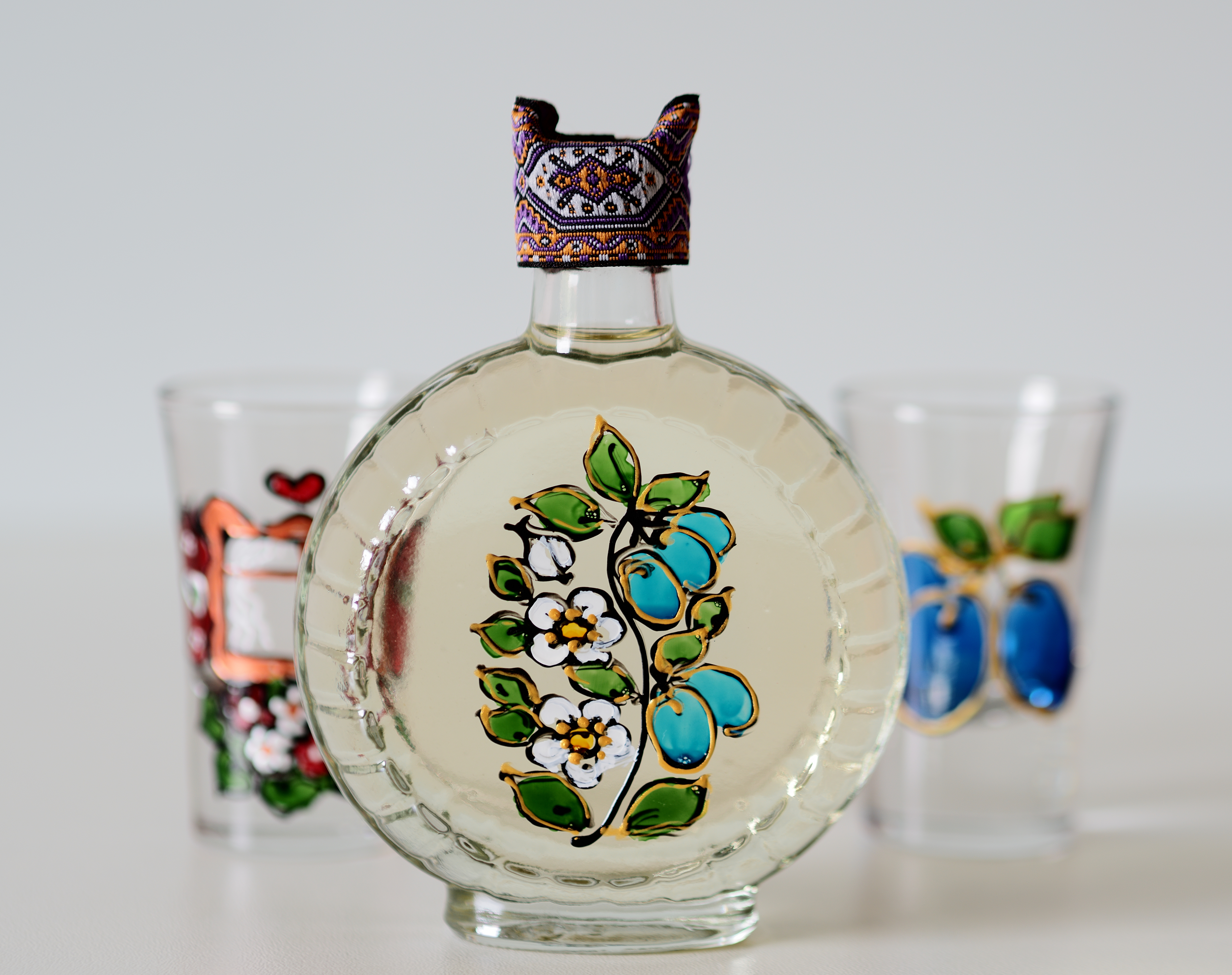
Slivovitz from Valjevo region

Rakija is a general term for distilled beverages made from fruits. There are numerous varieties, which are usually named after the type of fruit they are made from. Comparatively many people brew their own rakija. Loza, made from grapes, is considered the national drink.

==== Beer ====
Beer has become recently popular and is enjoyed in Serbia, even outpacing the traditional raki and wine. The largest brewery in the country is Apatinska pivara.

==== Wine ====
There are nearly 110,000 hectares of vineyards in Serbia, producing about 645,000 tons of grapes annually, with South Serbia producing the most. Because of that, Serbia is internationally recognized as a great wine producer.

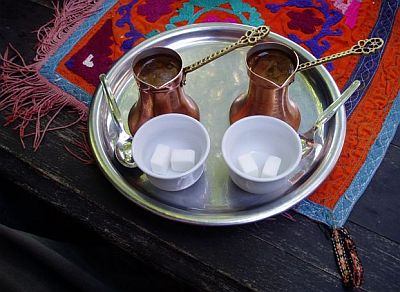
Serbian coffee being served

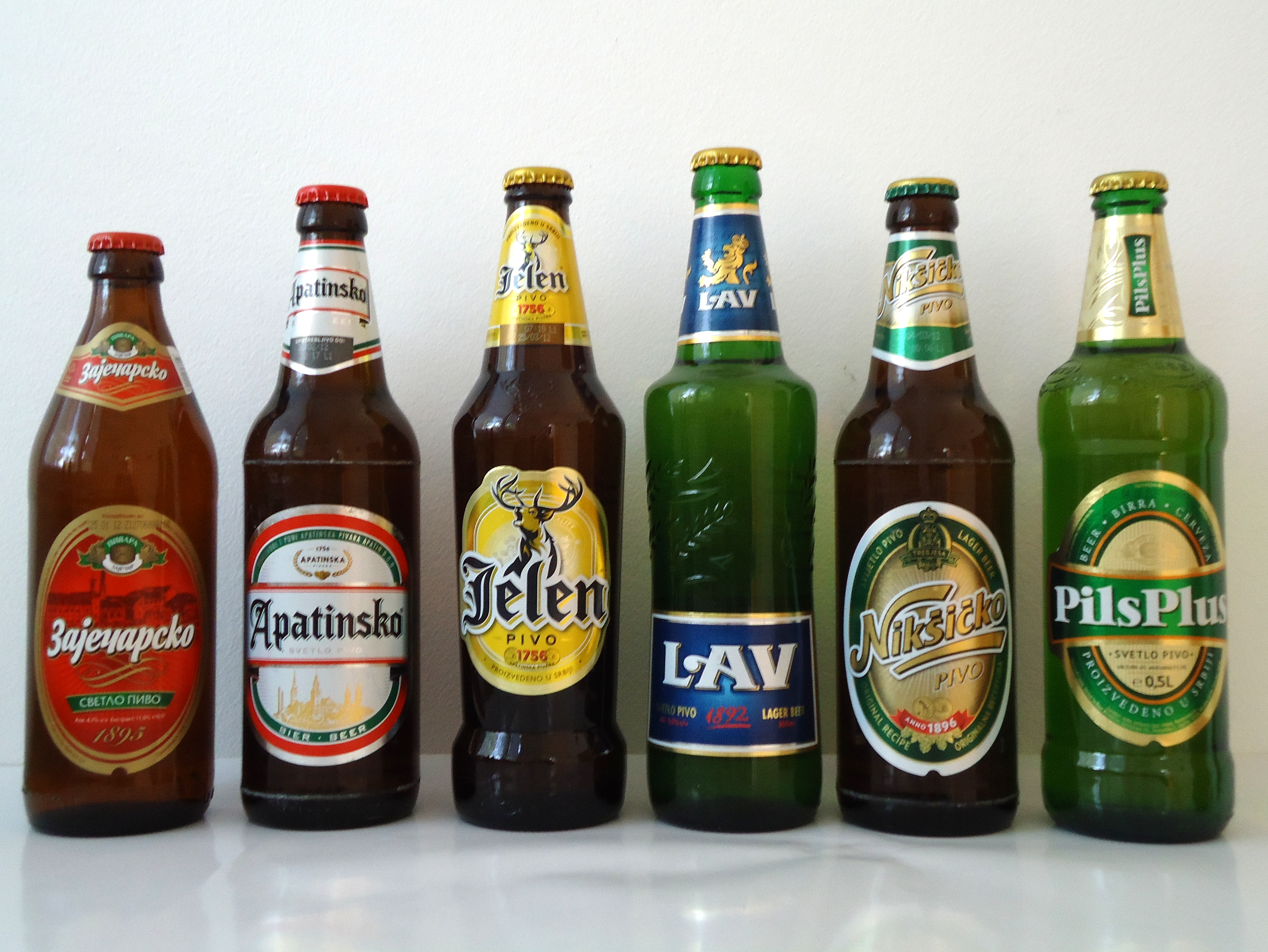
Various Serbian beer brands

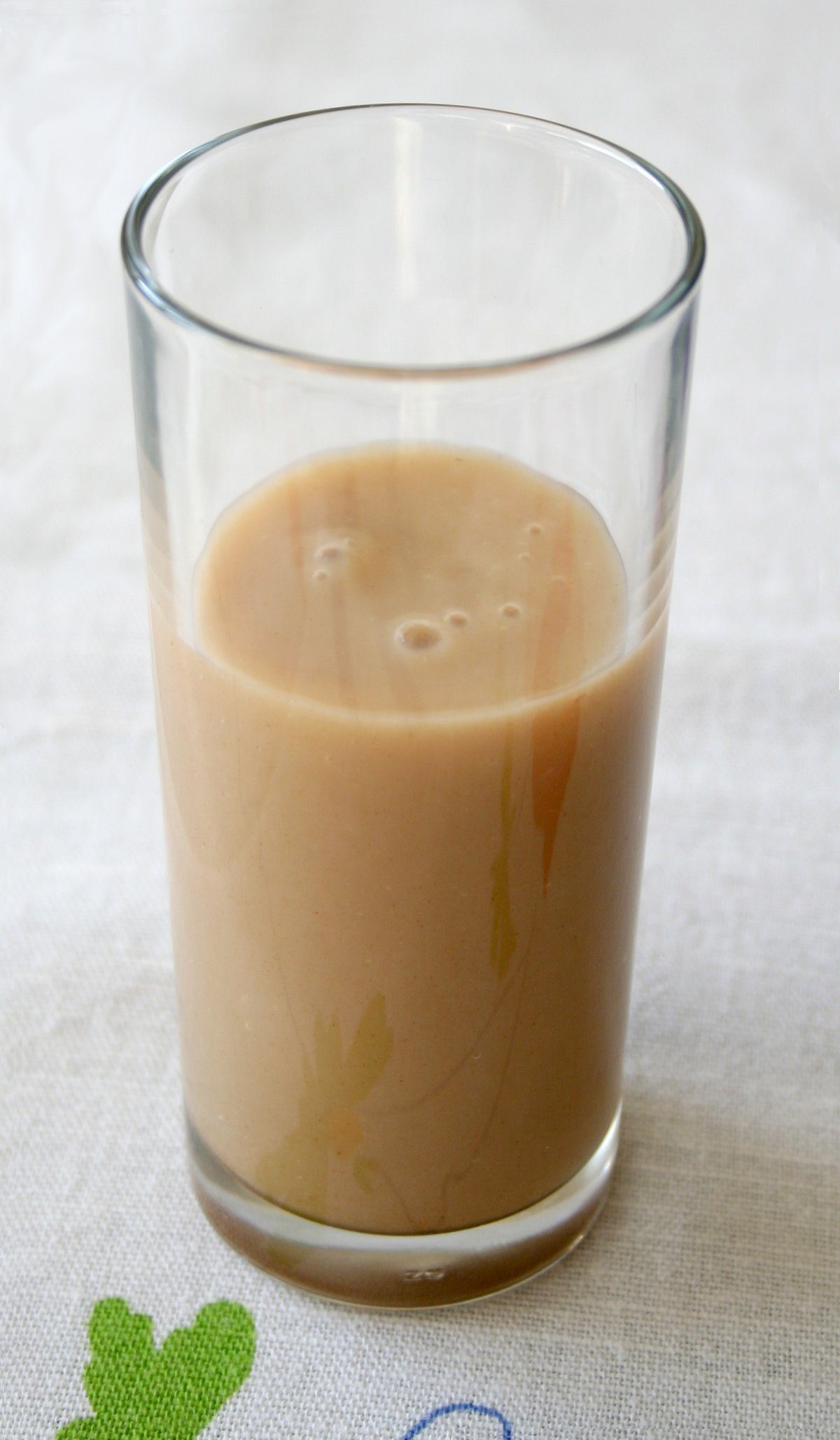
Boza

== Food festivals ==
There are many Food festivals in Serbia

- Roštiljijada ("Grill fest"), held annually in Leskovac in September.
- Turija Kobasicijada ("Turija Sausage fest"), held annually in Turija in February.
- Srem Kobasicijada ("Srem sausage fest"), held annually in Šid in February.
- Pršutijada ("Proscuitto fest"), held annually in Mačkat in January.
- Festival kuglofa ("Kuglof festival"), held in Sremski Karlovci.
- Sremska kulenijada ("Srem Kulen fest"), held in Sremska Mitrovica in June.
- Štrudlijada ("Strudel fest"), held in Novo Miloševo in July.
- Dani banice ("Banica days"), held in Bela Palanka in August.
- Kupusijada ("Cabbage fest"), held in Mrčajevci in September.
- Festival zimnice ("Pickling fest"), held in Koceljeva in September.
- Čvarkijada ("Čvarci fest"), held in Valjevo in October.

== See also ==
- Culture of Serbia
- Coffee culture in former Yugoslavia

== Sources ==
- Baltić, Milan Ž.; et al. (2010). "Meso u tradicionalnoj srpskoj kuhinji". 2. Simpozijum-Bezbednost I Kvalitet Namirnica Animalnog Porekla, 11–12. Novembar 2010: 44–54.
- Baltić, Milan Ž.; et al. (2018). "Meat in traditional Serbian cuisine". Meat Technology. 59 (1): 54–62. doi:10.18485/meattech.2018.59.1.7.
- Beštić-Bronza, Slavojka; Bronza, Boro (2020), "Ćevapi: A Paradigm of Yugoslav Gastronomic Brandification", Brotherhood and Unity at the Kitchen Table: Food in Socialist Yugoslavia: 117–131 – via ResearchGate
- Kostic, Isidora; Wilson, Josh (16 April 2025). "The Serbian Food Dictionary". Folkways.
- Mitchell, Laurence (2013). Serbia. Bradt Travel Guides. ISBN 978-1-84162-463-1.
- Nedić, Vesna (6 March 2025). "Secrets of Serbian Cuisine". Our Kitchen. SAN Magazine.
- Rakić, Mira; Rakić, Beba (2010). "POZICIONIRANJE I DIFERENCIRANJE TRADICIONALNE SRPSKE HRANE". Economic Themes. 48 (2).
- Kilibarda, Nataša, et al. "Gastronomske manifestacije kao deo turističke ponude nematerijalnog kulturnog nasleđa Srbije." Proceedings of SITCON 2018-Singidunum International Tourism Conference Belgrade, Serbia. 2018.
- Spasić, Darko (February 1998), "Прилог историјату ћевапчића", Istorijske Sveske (in Serbian), 3, Srpsko nasleđe
- Vrzić, Nikola (December 28, 2000). "Sve srpske kašike" (Windows-1250). NIN (in Serbian).
