= Pljeskavica =

Traditional Balkan meat dish

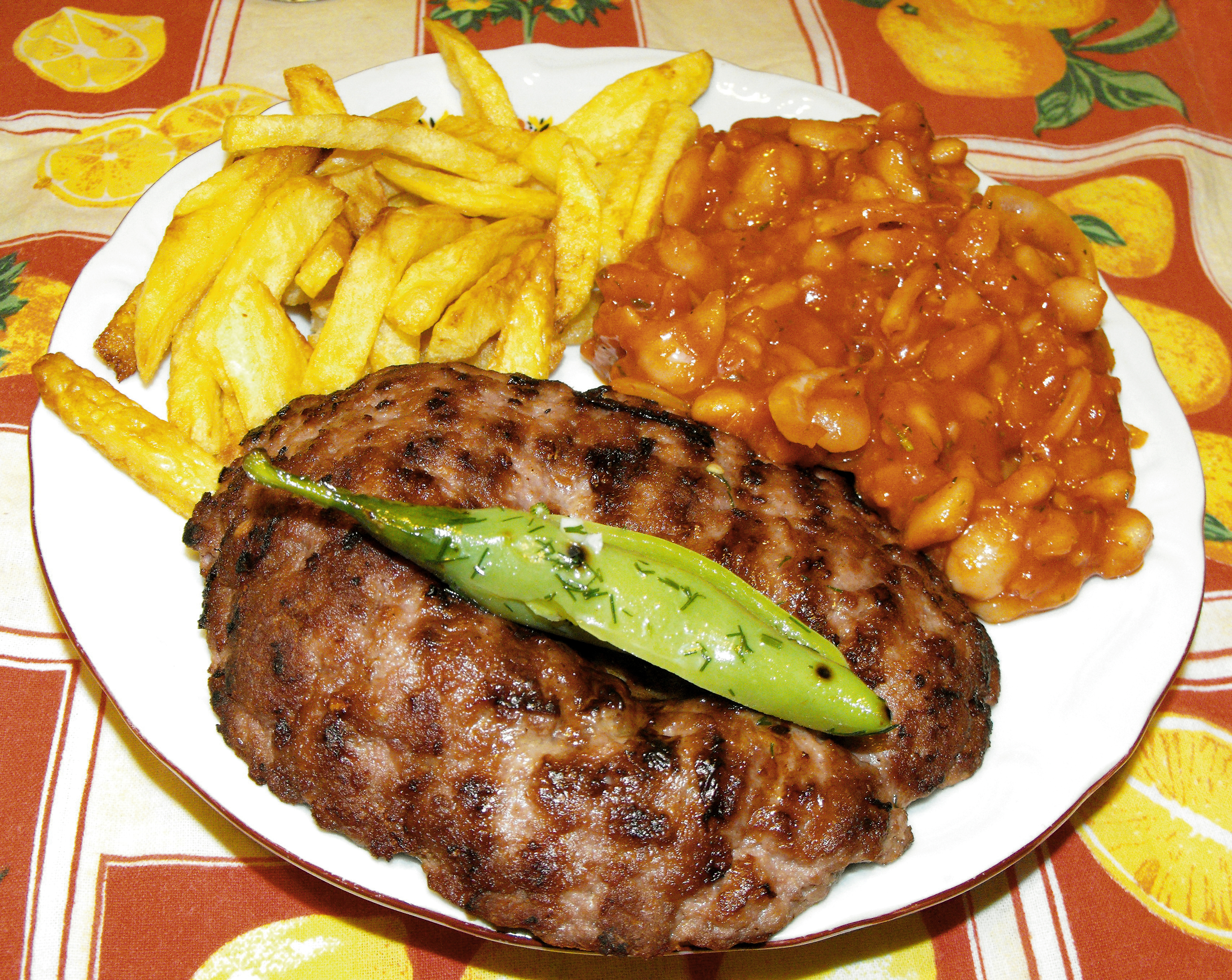
- Pljeskavica with side dishes
- Course: Main course
- Place of origin: Serbia
- Region or state: Balkans
- Associated cuisine: Serbian
- Serving temperature: Hot
- Main ingredients: Two or more of beef, lamb, pork, veal; onions, sometimes bread crumbs and lard

Pljeskavica (Serbian Cyrillic: пљескавица, pronounced [pʎɛ̂skaʋitsa], Romanian: plescavița) is a Serbian grilled dish consisting of a mixture of spiced minced pork, beef and lamb meat. It is one of the national dishes of Serbia as well as being popular in the neighbouring countries, such as Bosnia and Herzegovina, Croatia, and Montenegro. Pljeskavica is also popular street food in Romania, Hungary, Bulgaria, North Macedonia, and Slovenia.

Pljeskavica is a main course served with onions, kajmak (milk cream), beans, sometimes ajvar (relish), and urnebes (spicy cheese salad), either on the plate with side dishes, or with lepinja (flatbread, as a type of hamburger).

== History ==
Recently, pljeskavica has gained popularity elsewhere in Europe and is served in a few speciality fast food restaurants in Germany, Sweden, and Austria. Varieties include the "Leskovac pljeskavica" (Leskovačka pljeskavica), very spicy with onions; "Šar pljeskavica" (Šarska pljeskavica), stuffed with kačkavalj cheese; "Hajduk pljeskavica" (Hajdučka pljeskavica), of beef mixed with smoked pork meat; and "Vranje pljeskavica" (Vranjanska pljeskavica). Since 2008, the name Leskovac pljeskavica has been a legally protected term for pljeskavica from the Jablanica District of Serbia.

== See also ==
- Ćevapi
- Hamburger
- Salisbury steak
