= Rinflajš =

Serbian dish

- Course: Main course
- Place of origin: Serbia, province of Vojvodina
- Serving temperature: Hot
- Main ingredients: Beef brisket, mashed potato, carrots, bell peppers, parsnip, onions, parsley, cauliflower, tomato juice, flour, paprika
- Variations: Chicken rinflajš

Rinflajš (Serbian Cyrillic: ринфлајш) is a Serbian dish traditionally made in the province of Vojvodina. The name rinflajš is borrowed from the German word Rindfleisch (meaning beef).

The meal is usually made for Sunday lunches. A whole beef brisket, which has been slowly simmered in a broth with carrots, bell peppers, parsnip, onions, parsley and cauliflower, is usually served with a side dish of vegetables from the broth as well as mashed potatoes covered in a tomato sauce made from slowly simmered flour, tomato juice, paprika and sugar.

== See also ==
- Serbian cuisine
