= Proja =

Type of cornbread

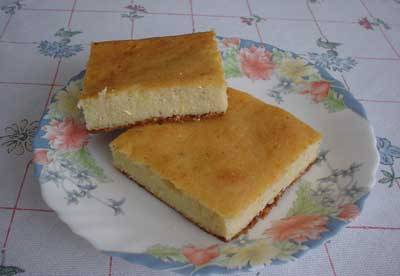
- Proja, a part of Serbian cuisine
- Alternative names: Proha, prova, razljevak
- Type: Bread
- Place of origin: Serbia
- Region or state: Balkans
- Main ingredients: Corn flour, baking powder, oil, sparkling water
- Variations: Projara

Proja (Serbian Cyrillic: Проја, pronounced [ˈprǒːja]) is a national dish of Serbia made of corn flour, baking powder, sunflower oil, sparkling water and salt. It is one of Serbia's main national dishes, and the ingredients are respectively made by Serbian local food producers. An alternative name for proja (Проја) is also projara (Пројара). Proha, prova or razljevak. It is a type of cornbread and is usually eaten for breakfast with ajvar and kajmak.

It has been popular in times of widespread poverty, mostly in Serbia during World War 1, among soldiers of Royal Serbian Army and remains a popular everyday meal to this day. It is often mistaken with projara, a somewhat fancier variant of proja, which includes the additional ingredients flour, eggs and yogurt.

The ingredients should be mixed together and baked in a greased pan (which should be 5 cm high) until golden. It is considered best served with kajmak and sour cream.

In October 2025, CNN (CNN travel) named Serbia's proja one of the 50 best breads in the world.

== See also ==
- List of quick breads
