= Pasulj =

Bean stew or soup

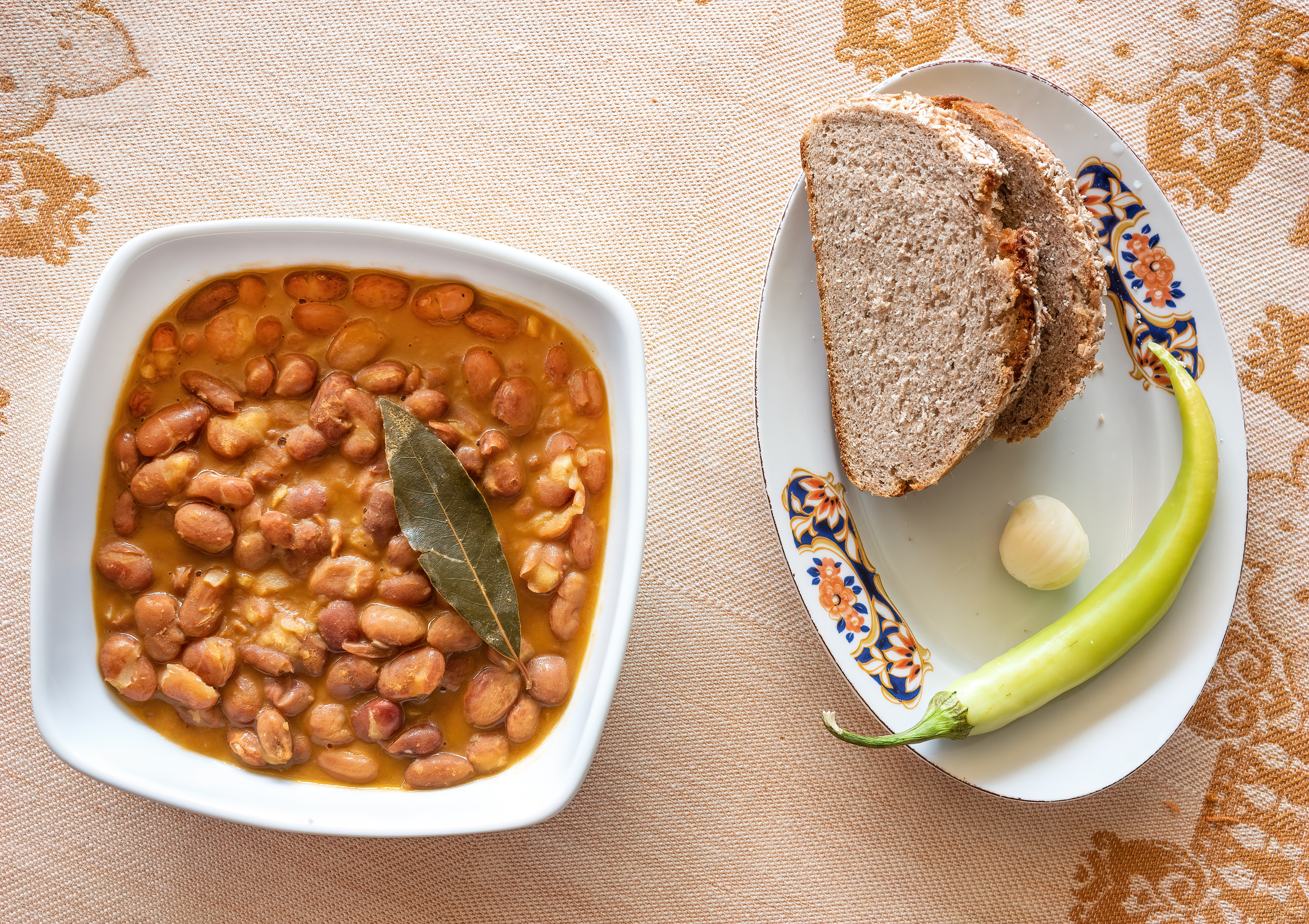
- Šareni pasulj (pinto beans)
- Alternative names: Grah, Grav, Grosh (Albanian)
- Type: Soup
- Region or state: The Balkans
- Main ingredients: White or brown beans; Meat or smoked meat

Pasulj (from phaseolus; пасуљ), grah (грах) or grav (грав) is a bean stew or soup made of usually white, cranberry, pinto or kidney beans, which is a popular dish in Balkan cuisine. It is normally prepared with meat, particularly smoked meat such as smoked bacon, sausage, and ham hock, and is a dish typically eaten in the winter months, especially around the Christmas period. Other commonly used ingredients include carrots and onions. Another version of the dish using baked beans is known as prebranac. The dish can be served both hot or cold, and it is typically served with a side of sour cream or ajvar, and bread.

It is sometimes known in English as Serbian bean soup, or Serbian baked beans and in German-speaking countries as Serbische Bohnensuppe ("Serbian bean soup"). Most Balkan countries have a variation of the dish. In Bulgaria it is known as bob or bob chorba, which literally means "beans" or "bean soup". In Hungary, it is known as paszulyleves/bableves (“bean soup”) or paszulyfőzelék/babfőzelék (“bean stew”). It can be in the form of a soup or with less liquid and baked. In North Macedonia, a spicy and thicker variant is known as tavče gravče (Тавче гравче; beans on a skillet), and greens such as celery and cabbage are often added. In Bosnia and Herzegovina, and Croatia, kajmak, a type of thick clotted cream is often added. The dish is believed to have roots in the Ottoman Empire, with the Turks believed to have brought beans to the Balkans.

The idiom prosto kao pasulj ("simple as pasulj"), equates to English as easy as pie and French simple comme chou.

== See also ==
- List of bean soups
- List of legume dishes
- List of soups
- The dictionary definition of pasulj at Wiktionary
- Media related to Pasulj at Wikimedia Commons
