= Julia (2022 TV series) =

American television series based on the life of television chef Julia Child

- Genre: Comedy drama
- Created by: Daniel Goldfarb
- Starring: Sarah Lancashire; David Hyde Pierce; Bebe Neuwirth; Fran Kranz; Fiona Glascott; Brittany Bradford; Robert Joy
- Theme music composer: Jeff Danna
- Composer: Jeff Danna
- Country of origin: United States
- Original language: English
- No. of seasons: 2
- No. of episodes: 16

Production
- Executive producers: Daniel Goldfarb; Christopher Keyser; Kimberly Carver; Erica Lipez; Charles McDougall; Erwin Stoff
- Producers: Gordon Garreau; Sean Sforza; Donna E. Bloom
- Running time: 43–49 minutes
- Production companies: 3 Arts Entertainment; Modern O Productions, INC.; Mad Ben Productions; Lionsgate Television

Original release
- Network: HBO Max
- Release: March 31 – May 5, 2022
- Network: Max
- Release: November 16 – December 21, 2023

Julia is an American comedy drama television series created by Daniel Goldfarb that premiered on HBO Max on March 31, 2022. It is based on the life of Julia Child in the 1960s at Cambridge, Massachusetts, during the production of her television cooking show The French Chef. In May 2022, the series was renewed for a second season, which premiered on November 16, 2023. In January 2024, the series was canceled after two seasons.

== Cast and characters ==
=== Main ===
- Sarah Lancashire as Julia Child, a cookbook author who develops and stars in The French Chef, a pioneering cooking show
- David Hyde Pierce as Paul Child, Julia's husband, an artist and retired diplomat
  - Pierce also appears as Charlie, Paul's twin brother (season 2)
- Bebe Neuwirth as Avis DeVoto, Julia's close friend who volunteers to help with her show
- Fran Kranz as Russ Morash, producer and director of The French Chef at WGBH-TV
- Fiona Glascott as Judith Jones, Julia's book editor and friend who works at Knopf
- Brittany Bradford as Alice Naman, an associate producer at WGBH who champions Julia's show
- Robert Joy as Hunter Fox, president of WGBH (season 2, recurring season 1)

=== Recurring ===
- Jefferson Mays as P. Albert Duhamel, host of the literary program I've Been Reading
- Lindsey Broad as Dorothy Zinberg, a scholar and new mother who works on The French Chef as a volunteer (season 1, guest season 2)
- Judith Light as Blanche Knopf, Julia's publisher
- Erin Neufer as Marian Morash, Russ's wife
- Isabella Rossellini as Simone Beck, co-author of Julia's cookbooks who resides in France
- Adriane Lenox as Virginia Naman, Alice's mother
- Tosin Morohunfola as Isaac, a lawyer whom Alice dates
- Charlie Thurston as Roland, a WGBH network executive
- Danny Burstein as Stanley Lipschitz, a Harvard University physics professor with a romantic interest in Avis (season 2)
- Rachel Bloom as Elaine Levitch, a former CBS director hired for The French Chef (season 2)

=== Guest ===
- Christian Clemenson as James Beard, a celebrated chef who is friends with Julia
- Quincy Tyler Bernstine as Madeline Anderson, a documentary filmmaker who advises Russ
- Bryce Pinkham as John Updike, whose books Judith edits

==== Season 1 ====
- James Cromwell as John McWilliams, Julia's father
- Sam Brackley as Coco Van, a drag queen who idolizes Julia
- A.J. Shively as André Soltner, the chef at Lutèce
- Tracee Chimo as Betty Friedan, a feminist author who criticizes Julia's show
- Rob McClure as Fred Rogers, a children's television producer who meets Julia at a gala

==== Season 2 ====
- Melanie Mayron as Millie, host of a crafting show on WGBH, and her twin sister Tillie, Hunter's wife
- Lou Gala as Yvette, Simone Beck's maid
- Michael Cognata as Martin Luther Kilson Jr., Harvard University's first black professor, a guest on Russ's show
- Stockard Channing as Frances Fields, a wealthy widow involved with James Beard
- Oli Higginson as Jacques Brel, a Belgian singer invited to dine with Julia and Simone
- Nassim Lyes as Sam Slimani, a young artist involved with James Beard
- Paul Bandey as Jean-Paul Sartre, an existentialist author Judith edits
- Maggie Lacey as Helen Gurley Brown, a sexually liberated author who appears on I've Been Reading
- Paul Guilfoyle as Frank, a former acquaintance of Julia who works for the FBI
- Michael Esper as Noel, a reporter for Life magazine assigned to profile Julia
- John Rothman as Alfred A. Knopf Sr., estranged husband of Blanche and co-founder of Knopf
- Hannah Einbinder as Gretchen Fletcher, deputy U.S. chief of protocol
- Patrick Breen as Henry Haller, executive chef at the White House
- Deidrie Henry as Zephyr Wright, civil rights activist and personal chef to President Lyndon B. Johnson
- Meera Rohit Kumbhani as Madhur Jaffrey, actress and Indian cookbook author

== Episodes ==
Season	Episodes	Originally released		
Season	Episodes	First released	Last released	Network
1	8	March 31, 2022	May 5, 2022	HBO Max
2	8	November 16, 2023	December 21, 2023	Max

=== Season 1 (2022) ===
No. overall	No. in season	Title	Directed by	Written by	Original release date
1	1	"Omelette"	Charles McDougall	Daniel Goldfarb	March 31, 2022
In Oslo in 1961, cookbook author Julia Child and her husband Paul celebrate publishing company Knopf's offer to publish her book, Mastering the Art of French Cooking. One year later, the two live in Cambridge, Massachusetts, and Julia prepares to appear on a literary program on public television station WGBH-TV to promote her book. While doing her makeup, Julia meets associate producer Alice Naman, who had the idea to invite her as a guest. During the show, host Albert Duhamel is condescending toward Julia, but instead of discussing her book, Julia cooks an omelette onscreen. Julia and Paul go to dinner with their friend Avis DeVoto, who shames Paul after learning he did not watch the program. Julia's doctor informs her she is experiencing menopause. The next day, Julia sends Alice a letter proposing the idea of her hosting a cooking show. The male producers reject the idea, even though the station has received 27 letters from viewers wanting to see more of Julia. Alice delivers the news, but Julia offers to pay for a pilot episode, to which the station agrees. Paul is skeptical of the project, so Julia invites her editor Judith Jones to dinner, who convinces Paul to come around.
2	2	"Coq au Vin"	Charles McDougall	Daniel Goldfarb	March 31, 2022
Julia attempts to win over WGBH producer and director Russ Morash, who considers cooking to be beneath his intellectual ideals for public television. Judith puts her editorial work with novelist John Updike on hold to travel to Cambridge, where she helps Julia develop the pilot episode with the help of Paul, Avis, and Alice. At the pilot taping of The French Chef Julia prepares coq au vin but must contend with nerves, an unfamiliar kitchen set, and production mishaps which leave her despondent, believing that the taping was a disaster. As the pilot is broadcast, everyone involved expects it to be a failure.
3	3	"Boeuf Bourguignon"	Melanie Mayron	Eboni Booth	March 31, 2022
After the pilot broadcast, WGBH president Hunter Fox advocates for Julia's show, but the station lacks funding. Julia offers to pay for the show's food and crew expenses, raising money by hosting cooking classes in her home. Paul helps build the set based on Julia's home kitchen which he designed. Julia's friend Dorothy Zinberg and Avis volunteer to help with the show. As the first season production begins, Russ is placed in charge of The French Chef to his dismay, while Alice is promoted to producer of I've Been Reading the literary show hosted by Albert. Julia and Paul deal with a visit from Julia's father John who treats them with a dismissive attitude.
4	4	"Petit Fours"	Erica Dunton	Natalia Temesgen	April 7, 2022
The Boston Globe publishes a positive review of Julia's show, which aggravates a jealous Albert. At Julia's behest, Judith arranges for John Updike to appear on I've Been Reading to distract and appease Albert. Russ invents a technique to film close-ups of food through a mirror mounted above the set. Julia is invited to speak at her alma mater Smith College, where she encounters a woman who suggests she had a sexual encounter with Julia in college. Alice contacts public TV stations around the country in an attempt to sell distribution rights to The French Chef. To the surprise of Alice and her boss Hunter, KQED in San Francisco agrees to air the show. Paul opens an exhibition of his art at a local gallery, but is discouraged when only his photos of Julia sell. He acknowledges that his wife is the more successful artist and pledges to support her, but Julia feels uneasy about her growing fame.
5	5	"Crepes Suzette"	Jenée LaMarque	Emily Bensinger	April 14, 2022
Julia, Paul, Russ, and Judith travel to San Francisco on a promotional trip sponsored by KQED. Bolstered by the popularity of her show, Julia's book signing draws a large crowd. Culinary celebrity James Beard takes Julia on a night out, including a visit to a drag show where she meets Coco Van, a drag impersonator of herself. Paul feels excluded as everyone vies for Julia's time. In Boston, Alice feels unappreciated, receiving no credit for her syndication efforts.
6	6	"Breads"	Melanie Mayron	Erica Lipez	April 21, 2022
Russ, sleep deprived due to a newborn at home, gives Alice more producing responsibilities, while an episode must be reshot due to a tape malfunction. Julia is inspired to change the episode's recipe to sweetbreads. Judith spends the week at Julia's to work with her on a bread recipe, but is disappointed when Paul replaces Julia who is busy with reshoots. However, Paul and Judith bond over their meticulous bread making experiments, and she considers doing more cookbook writing. Alice wants to hire a production assistant to replace volunteers Avis and Dorothy, but Julia nixes the plan, saying she is loyal to the two women and Alice as well. Julia receives word that her father has died and the next day dedicates the episode to him. With the show sold to four markets, Hunter proposes a second season, and Julia agrees under the conditions that the station pays for the food budget and that Alice is named a full producer.
7	7	"Foie Gras"	Jenée LaMarque	Daniel Goldfarb & Christopher Keyser	April 28, 2022
Julia and her group travel to New York City to attend a public television gala hosted by WNET. When Paul catches the flu, Avis volunteers to watch over him, and the two become unlikely friends. Julia, Judith, and publisher Blanche Knopf have lunch at Lutèce, where Blanche bristles at the idea of television; later she demands that as her protégée, Judith should focus on literature rather than cookbooks. Russ meets with a civil rights documentary producer as he has ambitions to work on more serious projects, while Alice falls in love with Isaac, a New York lawyer. At the gala, feminist author Betty Friedan tells Julia that her show hurts women by keeping them locked into domestic roles, an accusation which disturbs Julia. Later while sitting alone, Julia is approached by Fred Rogers who comforts her.
8	8	"Chocolate Souffle"	Scott Ellis	Christopher Keyser & Daniel Goldfarb	May 5, 2022
Alice is promoted to lead producer on The French Chef while Russ moves on to work on other programs just as he starts to appreciate the value of Julia's cookery. Alice and Isaac consider a long-distance relationship. Judith chooses to work on both fiction and cookbooks, rejecting Blanche Knopf's demand, but is shocked to learn that Blanche is suffering from rapidly-advancing blindness. With Betty Friedan's criticism still weighing heavily on her, Julia announces she is ending The French Chef after its 25-episode first season. Julia tells Paul that she originated the idea for the show and self-financed it, facts which she had previously kept secret from him. Avis senses that Julia really does want to continue the show despite her doubts. Paul gives an impassioned plea to Julia to embrace everything she wants to do, including the show because it brings joy to people. Julia decides to return for a second season, with the stipulation that she will take time off to visit her co-author Simca in France to work on her next cookbook.

=== Season 2 (2023) ===
No. overall	No. in season	Title	Directed by	Written by	Original release date
9	1	"Loup en Croûte"	Melanie Mayron	Daniel Goldfarb & Christopher Keyser	November 16, 2023
In France, Julia butts heads with Simca while working on volume two of their cookbook. In Boston, Alice faces pressure to find the network’s next hit.
10	2	"Fried Chicken"	Melanie Mayron	Christopher Keyser & Daniel Goldfarb	November 16, 2023
After failing to see eye-to-eye with Simca, Julia proposes a culinary showdown. Meanwhile, Alice and Avis each face new romantic possibilities.
11	3	"Pressed Duck"	Scott Ellis	Teleplay by : Daniel Goldfarb & Christopher Keyser; Story by : Erica Lipez	November 16, 2023
Left to her own devices in Paris, Avis bonds with a prominent existentialist, while Julia turns to her friends at Le Cordon Bleu for help with an impossible recipe. As WGBH experiences a shake-up, Alice goes through a trial of her own.
12	4	"Chocolate Mousse"	Jenée LaMarque	Natalia Temesgen	November 23, 2023
After returning to Boston, Julia finds herself at odds with her new director and Avis's new beau. Later, a run-in with an old colleague finds Julia fielding questions from the FBI.
13	5	"Bûche de Noël"	Erica Dunton	Emily Bensinger	November 30, 2023
While preparing for an interview with Life magazine, Julia is thrown by a surprise visit from Paul’s domineering twin brother, Charles.
14	6	"Chartwinkerie"	Melanie Mayron	Kate Fodor & Thaddeus McCants	December 7, 2023
While WGBH prepares for their annual fundraiser, Julia receives an offer from a network with the funds to take The French Chef to the next level.
15	7	"Shrimp & Grits"	Jenée LaMarque	Christopher Keyser	December 14, 2023
After receiving an invitation from the White House, the WGBH crew travels down to the nation’s capital for a chance to film inside the President’s own kitchen. Back in Boston, Paul finds himself at the beck and call of various friends in need.
16	8	"Lobster Américaine"	Scott Ellis	Daniel Goldfarb	December 21, 2023
When the FBI descends on WGBH, Julia uses her experience in wartime espionage to keep the crew safe from accusations of “un-American conduct.”

== Production ==
The series entered development at HBO Max in September 2019 after being greenlit for a pilot order, with Chris Keyser showrunning, and Joan Cusack nearing a deal to star in the titular role. By March 2020, Cusack had exited the series, and Sarah Lancashire was cast as Julia. Tom Hollander, Brittany Bradford, Bebe Neuwirth and Isabella Rossellini were added in supporting roles. In March 2020, three days into initial filming of the pilot, production was suspended due to the COVID-19 pandemic.

In September 2020, David Hyde Pierce was cast to replace Hollander, who exited the project. In July 2021, Robert Joy, Erin Neufer, James Cromwell and Adriane Lenox were added to the cast.

Filming of the pilot resumed in Boston in October 2020. In January 2021, it was announced that the pilot—written by Daniel Goldfarb and directed by Charles McDougall—had been picked up to series, with an 8-episode order. Filming wrapped in September 2021.

The series premiered on March 31, 2022, with the first three episodes available immediately and the rest debuting on a weekly basis until May 5. On May 4, 2022, HBO Max renewed the series for a second season, which premiered on November 16, 2023. In September 2022, it was reported that Rachel Bloom joined the cast for the second season. In January 2024, it was reported that the series was canceled after two seasons.

== Reception ==
The review aggregator website Rotten Tomatoes reported a 93% approval rating with an average rating of 8.0/10, based on 44 critic reviews. The website's critics consensus reads, "Sarah Lancashire inhabits Julia Child with infectious joie de vivre in this appetizing valentine to the iconic chef." Metacritic, which uses a weighted average, assigned a score of 76 out of 100 based on 20 critics, indicating "generally favorable reviews".

For the second season, Rotten Tomatoes reported a 100% approval rating with an average rating of 7.0/10, based on 10 critic reviews. The website's critics consensus reads, "Understanding its strengths and leaning straight into them, Julia's deuxième cours is a delectable trifle that viewers will savor." Metacritic, which uses a weighted average, assigned a score of 76 out of 100 based on 7 critics, indicating "generally favorable reviews".

Amy Amatangelo, for Paste, wrote that the "series is billed as a comedy and there are definitely funny moments—notably when people are literally on the floor assisting Julia in the filming of her show—but Julia explores not just how pioneering Child was in showing cooking on TV, but how pioneering she was for television production in general. [...] Ultimately, the series hinges on Lancashire’s transformative performance. [...] The series thrives through its strong female characters". David Cote, for The A.V. Club, gave Julia a B+ and wrote that "each 45-ish-minute episode walks a line between sentimental period drama and high-toned sitcom. [...] Lancashire carries the season on sturdy shoulders". Cote commented that the "season arc is fairly standard" and that "the nearest Julia has to a villain is Feminine Mystique author Betty Friedan (Tracee Chimo), who chides Child at a public television gala for setting back the cause. It's a powerful moment that shakes Julia and complicates her status as female liberator".

Kathryn VanArendonk, for Vulture, called the show a "bracing, comforting hit of competence porn: people who care, doing their jobs well". VanArendonk highlighted that "the effort to loop Child into the cultural and historical context of her time makes Julia a better show than it could otherwise have been. [...] Julia has some flaws, but its good qualities outweigh the missteps". Caroline Framke, for Variety, compared Julia to The Marvelous Mrs. Maisel as both shows share the producer Daniel Goldfarb; the show "does a remarkable job recreating a specific slice of upper middle class life as anchored by a white woman whose outsized personality comes with similarly notable talent". Framke wrote that "even as the series (from showrunner Chris Keyser) identifies more complex themes at play — Julia's heartbreak at hitting menopause before having a child, her Black producer Alice (Brittany Bradford) struggling to gain the respect she deserves — it's mostly happy to skip along the (admittedly very charming) surface".

Both Framke and VanArendonk praised Bradford's performance as Alice, a fictional character based on the actual producer Ruth Lockwood, but criticized Alice's storyline in the show. Framke commented that "by making her a Black woman, Julia tries to be more inclusive than the reality without fully reckoning with what it would mean for a Black woman to be producing a show made by and catering to well-off white women who might fancy themselves more progressive than they truly are". VanArendonk wrote that while Julia shows Alice experiencing workplace harassment, it does not force the audience "to think about racism all that much. [...] Alice is an invention who feels too neatly invented".
