= Brittany Bradford =

American actor and producer

- Bradford in 2026
- Occupations: Actor, producer
- Known for: Julia (2022); The Watcher (2022); Dead Ringers (2023); The Terror: Devil in Silver (2026)

Brittany Bradford is an American television actress and producer.

She is perhaps best known for her roles in television series such as Julia, The Watcher, and The Terror: Devil in Silver.

== Early life and career ==
Bradford's breakout role came in 2022 when she was cast in Julia, a series centered around television chef Julia Child. In the series, Bradford portrays Alice Naman, an associate producer at WGBH-TV who champions Child's cooking show. Alice Naman was a fictional character inspired by Ruth Lockwood, the real-life producer behind Julia Child's The French Chef. According to Bradford, having a Black character allowed the writers to explore the cultural and social dynamics of the 1960s.

Following her role in Julia, Bradford continued to be cast in other projects, including The Watcher and Dead Ringers. She has also appeared in Fire Country, Fear the Walking Dead, New Amsterdam and The Gilded Age.

Bradford has also performed in stage productions, including in Branden Jacobs-Jenkins' The Comeuppance and Alice Childress' Wedding Band: A Love/Hate Story in Black and White.
