= La Pitchoune =

Stucco house in France

Coordinates: 43.6492°N 6.9797°E

La Pitchoune is a small stucco house that Julia Child and her husband, Paul, built in the Provençal village of Plascassier in France in the early 1960s. La Pitchoune is a Provençal expression for "the little one", deriving from the Occitan word pichon.

The cottage was built on property belonging to Simone Beck and her husband Jean Fischbacher with a "handshake" promise they would turn it over to the Fischbachers when they finished their use. The Childs began construction in 1963 and occupied the property shortly thereafter. "La Pitchoune" was often lovingly shortened to "La Peetch", and the Childs visited the property yearly. Here they entertained the culinary likes of James Beard and M. F. K. Fisher.

Following the deterioration of Paul's health and the death of long-time friend Simone Beck in December 1991, Julia relinquished the property in June 1992. She later recalled that La Pitchoune had lost its "raison d’être" without Paul or Simone and that she had no regrets giving up the property.

== Other residents and usage ==
In 1993, La Pitchoune became home to the culinary school 'Cooking with Friends in France' run by American Kathie Alex, where she offered 6-day courses for up to six people. Alex studied under Simone Beck and worked at the nearby Moulin de Mougins. Child once wrote to Alex: “I’m counting on you to teach Americans about butter and cream!” Alex closed the school in 2015, and La Pitchoune was put on the public market.

Makenna Held, who, like Child, attended Smith College, purchased the house with investors and immediately opened it to the public for vacation rentals. La Pitchoune is the home to the Courageous Cooking School, a five-night, six-day cooking experience.
