= The Same Storm =

- Directed by: Peter Hedges
- Written by: Peter Hedges
- Produced by: Dianne Dreyer; Elizabeth Cuthrell; David Urrutia
- Starring: Sandra Oh; Mary-Louise Parker; Elaine May; Moses Ingram; Noma Dumezweni; Raúl Castillo; Rosemarie DeWitt; Ron Livingston; Alison Pill; John Gallagher Jr. Daphne Rubin-Vega; Joshua Leonard; Jin Ha; Judith Light; Ato Blankson-Wood; Cory Michael Smith; Rhenzy Feliz; Camila Perez; K. Todd Freeman; Danny Burstein; Joel de la Fuente; Raza Jaffrey; Brittany Bradford; David Zaldivar
- Cinematography: Maceo Bishop
- Edited by: Tricia Holmes; Max Ethan Miller
- Music by: Kevin Salem; Bandits on the Run; Peter Hedges
- Production companies: Home Plate Pictures; Straight Up Technologies
- Distributed by: Juno Films; Evenstar Films
- Release date: September 2, 2021 (Telluride)
- Running time: 99 minutes
- Country: United States
- Language: English

The Same Storm is a 2021 American drama film written and directed by Peter Hedges and starring Sandra Oh, Mary-Louise Parker, Elaine May, Moses Ingram, Noma Dumezweni, Raúl Castillo, Rosemarie DeWitt, Ron Livingston, Alison Pill, John Gallagher Jr., Daphne Rubin-Vega, Joshua Leonard, Jin Ha, Cory Michael Smith and Judith Light.

== Plot ==
Twenty-four people grapple with the COVID-19 pandemic in spring and summer 2020.

== Cast ==
- Sandra Oh as Grace Park
- Mary-Louise Parker as Roxy
- Elaine May as Ruth Lipsman Berg
- Moses Ingram as Audre Robinson
- Raúl Castillo as Nurse Joey
- Noma Dumezweni as Dionne Davis
- Rhenzy Feliz as Jose Sera
- Jin Ha as Elliot Park
- Joel de la Fuente as John Park
- Ron Livingston as Jim Lamson
- Rosemarie DeWitt as Cindy Lamson
- Alison Pill as Bridget Salt
- John Gallagher Jr. as Dale Salt
- Cory Michael Smith as Jeremy Salt
- Judith Light as Shirlee Salt
- Daphne Rubin-Vega as Lupe Ramirez
- Joshua Leonard as Doug Salt
- K. Todd Freeman as Leon Robinson
- Danny Burstein as Dr. Daniel Berg
- Brittany Bradford as Imani Hart
- Raza Jaffrey as Dr. Sanjay Patel
- Camila Perez as Frieda Ramirez
- Ato Blankson-Wood as Russell Davis
- David Zaldivar as Mateo Ramirez

== Release ==
The film had its world premiere at the 48th Telluride Film Festival in 2021. In August 2022, it was announced that Juno Films acquired American, Canadian and British distribution rights to the film, which was released in the Quad Cinema in New York City and the Laemmle Santa Monica on October 14, 2022.

== Reception ==
The film has a 79% rating on Rotten Tomatoes based on 14 reviews. Nell Minow of RogerEbert.com awarded the film three and a half stars. David Ehrlich of IndieWire graded the film a B−.

Lisa Kennedy of Variety gave the film a positive review and wrote, "...it’s an often-touching time capsule of a harrowing moment in which rampant death and police brutality, white privilege and surging activism answered the call of so much grief."

Beatrice Loayza of The New York Times gave the film a negative review and wrote, "The film proves one thing, at least: Like many of us, Hedges and his actors clearly had too much time on their hands."

Stephen Farber of The Hollywood Reporter gave the film a positive review and wrote, "In short, this film leaves us moved and provoked — and impressed with its technical accomplishments — even if it isn’t a perfect distillation of our ongoing national nightmare."

Todd McCarthy of Deadline Hollywood also gave the film a positive review, calling it "...a grab bag that mostly engages your attention and sticks in the mind as a vivid slap-dash portrait of a city and, by extension, a world under siege."
