= Plascassier =

District of Grasse, France

Coordinates: 43°39′N 6°59′E

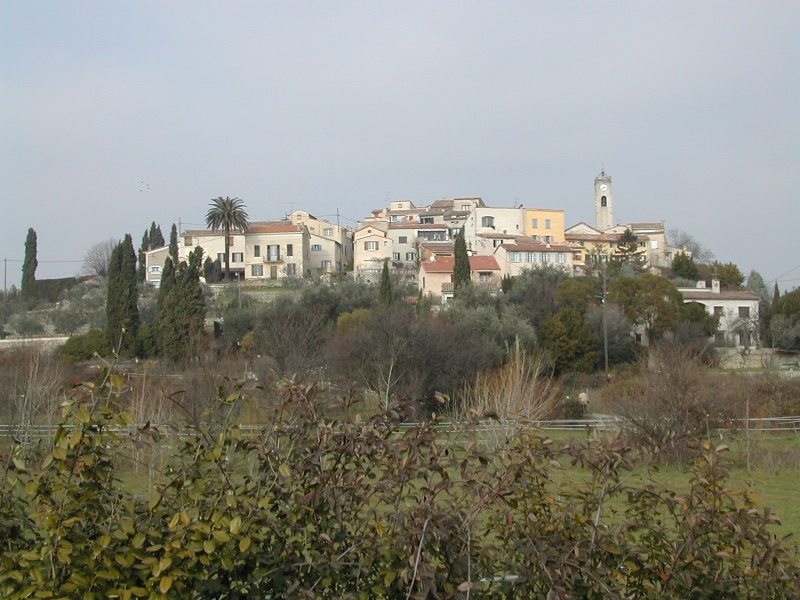
Plascassier Neighbourhood

Plascassier (French pronunciation: [plɑskasje]) is located between Valbonne (2.8 km) and Grasse (7 km) and only 31 km away from Nice airport. Although bordered by several communes—Valbonne, Opio, Mouans-Sartoux and Châteauneuf-de-Grasse—it falls under the jurisdictional umbrella of Grasse.

== Notable residents ==
French singer Édith Piaf died here on 10 October 1963.

La Pitchoune, the former residence of American French cuisine chef Julia Child and her husband Paul, is located in Plascassier.
