= Baking with Julia =

American television cooking program

- Author: Julia Child, Dorie Greenspan
- Language: English
- Subject: Culinary Arts
- Genre: non-fiction
- Publisher: William Morrow & Co.
- Publication date: 1996
- Publication place: United States
- Media type: book
- Pages: 480
- ISBN: 0-688-14657-0
- OCLC: 96023061
- Dewey Decimal: 641.8/15 20
- LC Class: TX763 .G654 1996
- Preceded by: In Julia's Kitchen with Master Chefs
- Followed by: Julia and Jacques Cooking at Home

Baking with Julia is an American television cooking program produced by Julia Child and the name of the book which accompanied the series. Each episode featured one pastry chef or baker who demonstrates professional techniques that can be performed in a home kitchen. It was taped primarily in Child's Cambridge, Massachusetts house (Julia Child's kitchen was converted into a TV studio for the purpose) and was aired over four television seasons from 1997 to 1999; it is still occasionally aired in reruns on Create on PBS digital stations.

The series was created as a spinoff of the Cooking with Master Chefs series due to a significant response to the baking episodes and was a nation co-production of A La Carte Communications and Maryland Public Television. The accompanying book was written by baker and food writer Dorie Greenspan with assistance from Child and food tester David Nussbaum, and includes brief biographical sketches of the chefs involved in the show.

Among the prominent bakers and pastry chefs featured were:

- Alice Medrich (Episode 102)
- Michel Richard (Episodes 103, 304)
- Marcel Desaulniers (Episodes 105, 307)
- Gale Gand (Episodes 106, 312)
- Norman Love (Episode 107)
- Nancy Silverton (Episodes 111, 303)
- Steve Sullivan
- Naomi Duguid and Jeffrey Alford (Episodes 203, 311)
- Norman Love (Episode 213)
- Martha Stewart (Episodes 301, 302)

== Bibliography ==
- Julia Child and Dorie Greenspan. Baking With Julia New York: William Morrow & Co., 1996, 481pp, illus. ISBN 0-688-14657-0
