= The French Chef =

American television cooking show created and hosted by Julia Child

- Child demonstrating how to cook an omelette on the first season of The French Chef
- Genre: Cooking
- Created by: Julia Child
- Directed by: Russell Morash; Russell Fortier; David Griffiths; David B. Atwood
- Presented by: Julia Child
- Theme music composer: John Morris
- Country of origin: United States
- Original language: English
- No. of seasons: 8
- No. of episodes: 212

Production
- Producer: Ruth Lockwood
- Production locations: WGBH Studios, Boston, Massachusetts
- Running time: 28 minutes
- Production company: WGBH-TV

Original release
- Network: NET (1963-66); PBS (1970-73)
- Release: February 11, 1963 – January 14, 1973

The French Chef is an American television cooking show created and hosted by Julia Child, produced and broadcast by WGBH, the public television station in Boston, Massachusetts, from February 11, 1963 to January 14, 1973. It was one of the first cooking shows on American television.

The French Chef was first shown with a pilot on July 26, 1962. After two more episodes were broadcast in the summer, the show premiered as a regular weekly series on February 11, 1963. The immensely popular show went on to air for 212 episodes. It is credited with convincing the American public to try cooking French food at home.

The show grew out of a special presentation Child gave on WGBH based on the book Mastering the Art of French Cooking which she co-authored. The French Chef was produced from 1963 to 1973 by WGBH for National Educational Television (and later for PBS). Reruns continued on PBS until 1989, and were airing on Cooking Channel as of 2010. As of September 2016, episodes were being rerun on the new Canadian cooking channel Gusto, and later, Makeful. As recently as March 2017, reruns of the show were also seen on the American Public Television Create channel.

The original episodes were available on the PBS streaming service as of 2020. In July 2021, certain episodes were added to the Pluto TV lineup, together with other Julia Child cooking programs.

== Format ==
The French Chef introduced French cooking to the United States at a time when it was considered expensive restaurant fare, not suitable for home cooking. Child emphasized fresh and, at the time, unusual ingredients.

All of the recipes used on The French Chef had originally appeared in Mastering the Art of French Cooking, but for the show, Child chose mostly the more domestic recipes from the book, although such showpieces as Beef Wellington, various sorts of soufflé, and some ambitious pastries also made it into the mix if they seemed within the reach of a home cook without staff.

The show was done live-to-videotape from start to finish, leaving little room for mistakes. The resulting occasional accidents became a popular trademark of Child's on air presence, used as "teachable moments" to encourage viewers to relax about the task's demands.

Certain elements became motifs: Julia's fondness for wine; her distinctive voice; her staunch defense of the use of butter (with margarine invariably referred to as "that other spread") and cream; her standard issue "impeccably clean towel"; and her closing line at the end of every show: "This is Julia Child, Bon appétit!"

== History ==
So good is she that men who have not the slightest intention of going to the kitchen for anything but ice cubes watch her for pure enjoyment.

— Time magazine cover story from November 1966

Child's first appearance cooking on TV had been by happenstance: a guest for another show on WGBH had canceled their appearance, as did the backup guest. Child was invited to do a cooking demonstration, which received positive feedback and prompted executives to order a pilot.

When the show began, the budget was so low that "volunteers had to be recruited to wash dishes, and the food sometimes had to be auctioned to the audience afterwards to cover expenses."

In 1964, Child received a Peabody Award, crediting her for doing "more than show us how good cooking is achieved; by her delightful demonstrations she has brought the pleasures of good living into many American homes." In May 1966, her show won a Primetime Emmy Award for Achievements in Educational Television – Individuals.

The January 4, 1965 episode of The French Chef, “Ham Dinner in Half an Hour”, featured an appearance by Julia’s husband Paul Cushing Child, who at the start of the show calls her to let her know that he’s bringing two friends home for dinner in half an hour.

The August 27, 1968 episode of The French Chef (rerun from an episode sometime in 1965) ended with the unexpected collapse of an Apple Charlotte.

On August 6, 1972, a rerun of The French Chef became the first U.S. television show to include captions for deaf viewers. The episode had open captions and featured coq au vin and chicken fricassee.

The show was produced by Ruth Lockwood and directed by Russell Morash, Russell Fortier, David Griffiths and David B. Atwood. Film composer John Morris wrote the second theme song for The French Chef.

The show eventually became so popular that Child's use of a particular ingredient each week would sometimes cause a surge in demand and lead to grocery stores across the country temporarily selling out of it.

== Legacy ==
Child and WGBH would collaborate again on the series Julia Child & Company from 1978 to 1980, Dinner at Julia's from 1983 to 1984, and a series of home videos in 1985 called The Way to Cook. Child would be paired with other food personalities for two additional PBS series in the 1990s, Cooking with Master Chefs: Hosted by Julia Child which ran for a single season from 1993 to 1994, and Baking with Julia for three seasons from 1996 to 1998. She also participated in the show Julia Child & Jacques Pépin Cooking at Home which won a Daytime Emmy Award in 2001.

As part of its growing Twitch Creative content, Twitch streamed every episode of The French Chef over a four-day period starting on March 15, 2016, to launch its new food channel. Twitch reported that almost a million viewers watched the marathon.

Julia, a television series based on Child and the creation of The French Chef, premiered on HBO Max in 2022.

== List of episodes ==
=== Pilots (1962) ===
The three pilot episodes were subsequently taped over by the studio, a common practice at the time, and no copies are known to exist today. The subjects of the pilot episodes were revisited early in the show's run, with the French omelet and onion soup appearing in the first season and Coq au Vin in the second.

Episode	Subject	Air Date
Pilot	The French Omelet	July 28, 1962
Pilot	Coq au Vin	July 1962
Pilot	Onion soup	July 1962

=== Season 1 (1963) ===
Child wrote that the first 13 episodes were lost at one point, but that the first 7 were found. However, PBS posted 23 episodes from the first season to YouTube in June 2022, with only French Onion Soup and Dinner In a Pot missing. Those two episodes were later posted in October 2022. The first few episodes were sponsored by S&H Green Stamps; starting with Chicken Breasts and Rice, this season was sponsored by Safeway Stores.

Episode	Subject	Air Date
E01	Boeuf Bourguignon	February 11, 1963
E02	French Onion Soup	February 18, 1963
E03	Casserole Roast Chicken	February 25, 1963
E04	The French Omelette	March 4, 1963
E05	Scallops	March 11, 1963
E06	Quiche Lorraine	March 18, 1963
E07	Fruit Tarts	March 25, 1963
E08	Filets of Sole in White Wine	April 1, 1963
E09	Hollandaise Sauce	April 8, 1963
E10	Non-Collapsible Soufflé	April 15, 1963
E11	Chicken Fricassee	April 22, 1963
E12	Roast Lamb the French Way	April 29, 1963
E13	French Chocolate Cake	May 6, 1963
E14	Chicken Breasts and Rice	May 13, 1963
E15	Vegetables à la Française	May 20, 1963
E16	Veal Scallops	May 27, 1963
E17	French Salads- Mayonnaise	June 3, 1963
E18	Chicken Livers à la Française	June 10, 1963
E19	Roast Duck à l'Orange	June 17, 1963
E20	Chocolate Mousse	June 24, 1963
E21	Pâtés	July 1, 1963
E22	Aspics	July 8, 1963
E23	Bouillabaisse	July 15, 1963
E24	Lobster à l'Américaine	July 22, 1963
E25	French Crêpes	July 29, 1963
E26	French Crêpes II - Suzette	August 5, 1963
E27	Steaks and Hamburgers	August 12, 1963
E28	The Potato Show	August 19, 1963
E29	Soufflé on a Platter	August 26, 1963
E30	Moussaka and Ratatouille	September 2, 1963
E31	Dinner in a Pot	September 9, 1963
E32	Pâte à Choux	September 16, 1963
E33	Caramel Desserts	September 23, 1963
E34	Cooking Your Goose	September 30, 1963

=== Season 2 (1963-1964) ===
This season was sponsored by Safeway Stores.

Episode	Subject	Air Date
E01	Chestnut Cookery	December 16, 1963
E02	Bûche de Noël	December 23, 1963
E03	Bringing in the New Year	December 30, 1963
E04	Coq au Vin	January 6, 1964
E05	Cassoulet	January 13, 1964
E06	Vegetable Adventures	January 20, 1964
E07	Puff Pastry	January 27, 1964
E08	More about Puff Pastry	February 3, 1964
E09	Fish Mousselines	February 10, 1964
E10	Cake for Company	February 17, 1964
E11	Artichokes from Top to Bottom	February 24, 1964
E12	Elegance with Eggs	March 2, 1964
E13	Cold Soufflés and Bavarian Cream	March 9, 1964
E14	Case for Salmon	March 16, 1964
E15	Broccoli and Cauliflower	March 23, 1964
E16	Veal for a King	March 30, 1964
E17	The Soup Show	April 6, 1964
E18	Flaming Soufflé	April 13, 1964
E19	Small Roast Birds	April 20, 1964
E20	Boeuf à la Mode	April 27, 1964
E21	Timbales	May 4, 1964
E22	Fish Filets Sylvestre	May 11, 1964
E23	Babas au Rhum	May 18, 1964
E24	Chicken Dinner in Half an Hour	May 25, 1964
E25	Rognons Sautés and Flambés	June 1, 1964
E26	Lobster Buffet	June 8, 1964
E27	The Mushroom Show	June 15, 1964
E28	Veal Dinner in Half an Hour	June 22, 1964
E29	Broiled Chicken Plain and Saucy	June 29, 1964
E30	Lamb Stew is French, Too	July 6, 1964
E31	Introducing Charlotte Malakoff	July 13, 1964
E32	Hot Turkey Ballotine	July 20, 1964
E33	Cold Turkey Galantine	July 27, 1964
E34	Le Marquis au Chocolat	August 3, 1964

=== Season 3 (1964-1965) ===
This season was sponsored by Polaroid Corporation; starting with Turban of Sole, Hills Bros. Coffee joined as co-sponsor.

Episode	Subject	Air Date
E01	Vegetables for the Birds	November 23, 1964
E02	French Tarts, Apple Style	November 30, 1964
E03	Feasting on the Remains	December 7, 1964
E04	French Jelly Roll	December 14, 1964
E05	Bûche de Noël	December 21, 1964
E06	Beef Gets Stewed Two Ways	December 28, 1964
E07	Ham Dinner in Half an Hour	January 4, 1965
E08	Croissants	January 11, 1965
E09	Chocolate Souffle	January 18, 1965
E10	Four in Hand Chicken	January 25, 1965
E11	Brioches	February 1, 1965
E12	Veal Prince Orloff	February 8, 1965
E13	Great Beginnings	February 15, 1965
E14	Turban of Sole	February 22, 1965
E15	Strawberry Tarts	March 1, 1965
E16	The Shrimp Show	March 8, 1965
E17	Salad Fixings	March 15, 1965
E18	Non-collapsible Cheese Soufflé	March 22, 1965
E19	Quiches	March 29, 1965
E20	Fish Dinner in Half an Hour	April 5, 1965

=== Season 4 (1965-1966) ===
This season was sponsored by Polaroid Corporation and Hills Bros. Coffee.

Episode	Subject	Air Date
E01	French Veal Stew	August 16, 1965
E02	Improvisation	August 23, 1965
E03	The Empress's Rice	August 30, 1965
E04	Coquilles St. Jacques	September 6, 1965
E05	More about Steaks	September 13, 1965
E06	To Poach a Salmon	September 20, 1965
E07	Invitation To Lunch	September 27, 1965
E08	Beef in Red Wine	October 4, 1965
E09	Your Own French Onion Soup	October 11, 1965
E10	Hollandaise and Béarnaise	October 18, 1965
E11	Chicken in Cocotte	October 25, 1965
E12	Queen of Sheba Cake (black & white)	November 1, 1965
E13	To Poach Sole Filets	November 8, 1965
E14	Chop Dinner in Half an Hour	November 15, 1965
E15	Filet of Beef Wellington	November 22, 1965
E16	Apple Charlotte	November 29, 1965
E17	More Great Beginnings	December 6, 1965
E18	Roast Suckling Pig	December 13, 1965
E19	More about Potatoes	December 20, 1965
E20	Croquembouche	December 27, 1965
E21	Steak Dinner in Half an Hour	January 3, 1966
E22	The Endive Show	January 10, 1966
E23	Saddle of Lamb	January 17, 1966
E24	Napoleons	January 24, 1966
E25	Paella à l'Américaine	January 31, 1966
E26	Dinner Party First Course	February 7, 1966
E27	Dinner Party Main Course	February 14, 1966
E28	Dinner Party Meringue Dessert	February 21, 1966
E29	Soupe au Pistou	February 28, 1966
E30	Quenelles	March 7, 1966
E31	Génoise Cake	March 14, 1966
E32	Petits Fours	March 21, 1966
E33	The Mayonnaise Show	March 28, 1966
E34	Swordfish Dinner in a Half Hour	April 4, 1966
E35	Ossobuco	April 11, 1966
E36	Sweetbreads and Brains	April 18, 1966

=== Season 5 (1966) ===
This was the last season to be presented by the Eastern Educational Television Network.

Episode	Subject	Air Date
E01	Asparagus from Tip to Butt	April 25, 1966
E02	Operation Chicken	May 2, 1966
E03	To Poach a Chicken	May 9, 1966
E04	Mousses, Bombes and Parfaits	May 16, 1966
E05	Bourride and Aïoli	May 23, 1966
E06	To Poach an Egg	May 30, 1966
E07	Roast Leg of Lamb	June 6, 1966
E08	Lobster Thermidor	June 13, 1966
E09	Speaking of Tongues	June 20, 1966
E10	Pipérade for Lunch	June 27, 1966

=== Season 6 (1970-1971) ===
The sixth season was the first produced in color and introduced a new theme tune for the opening titles. It was also the first to be presented by the Public Broadcasting Service. From this season on, Polaroid was the sole sponsor of the program.

Episode	Subject	Air Date
E01	Bouillabaisse à la Marseillaise	October 7, 1970
E02	Napoleon's Chicken	October 14, 1970
E03	The Spinach Twins	October 21, 1970
E04	Cake with a Halo	October 28, 1970
E05	Hamburger Dinner	November 4, 1970
E06	Salade Niçoise	November 11, 1970
E07	Turkey Breast Braised	November 18, 1970
E08	Lasagne à la Française	November 25, 1970
E09	Waiting for Gigot	December 2, 1970
E10	How about Lentils	December 9, 1970
E11	Fish in Monk's Clothing	December 16, 1970
E12	Gâteau in a Cage	December 23, 1970
E13	Cheese and Wine Party	December 30, 1970
E14	Curry Dinner	January 6, 1971
E15	Apple Dessert	January 13, 1971
E16	Meat Loaf Masquerade	January 20, 1971
E17	To Roast a Chicken	January 27, 1971
E18	Hard Boiled Eggs	February 3, 1971
E19	Boeuf Bourguignon	February 10, 1971
E20	Strawberry Soufflé	February 17, 1971
E21	Spaghetti Flambé	February 24, 1971
E22	French Bread	March 3, 1971
E23	More about French Bread	March 10, 1971
E24	Vegetable for all Occasions	March 17, 1971
E25	Pot au Feu	March 24, 1971
E26	Pizza Variations	March 31, 1971
E27	Begin with Shrimp	April 7, 1971
E28	Chocolate Cake	April 14, 1971
E29	Working with Chocolate	April 21, 1971
E30	To Press a Duck	April 28, 1971
E31	Flaky Pastry	May 5, 1971
E32	Glamour Pudding	May 12, 1971
E33	The Whole Fish Story	May 19, 1971
E34	VIP Veal: Poitrine Farcie	May 26, 1971
E35	Brochettes, Kebabs and Skewers	June 2, 1971
E36	Rye Bread	June 6, 1971
E37	Flaming Fish	June 13, 1971
E38	Summer Salads	June 20, 1971
E39	The Lobster Show	June 27, 1971

=== Season 7 (1971-1972) ===
Episode	Subject	Air Date
E01	Coq au Vin Alias Chicken Fricassee	October 6, 1971
E02	Mousse au Chocolat	October 13, 1971
E03	Quiche Lorraine and Company	October 20, 1971
E04	To Stuff a Sausage	October 27, 1971
E05	The Artichoke	November 3, 1971
E06	Tartes aux Fruits (Fruit Tarts)	November 10, 1971
E07	To Roast a Turkey	November 17, 1971
E08	French Croissants	November 24, 1971
E09	Soup du Jour	December 1, 1971
E10	Terrines and Pâtés	December 8, 1971
E11	Madeleines and Génoise Jelly Roll	December 15, 1971
E12	To Make a Bûche	December 22, 1971
E13	Le Cocktail	December 29, 1971
E14	Gallic Pot Roast	January 2, 1972
E15	Cheese Soufflé	January 9, 1972
E16	The Good Loaf	January 16, 1972
E17	The Hollandaise Family	January 23, 1972
E18	Tripes à la Mode	January 30, 1972
E19	Sole Bonne Femme	February 6, 1972
E20	Orange Bavarian Cream	February 13, 1972
E21	To Stuff a Cabbage	February 20, 1972
E22	The Omelette Show	February 27, 1972
E23	Elegance with Aspic	March 5, 1972
E24	French Fries	March 12, 1972
E25	Ham Transformation	March 19, 1972
E26	Ice Cream	March 26, 1972

=== Season 8 (1972-1973) ===
Episode	Subject	Air Date
E01	For Working Guys and Gals	October 1, 1972
E02	Small Kitchen, Big Ideas	October 8, 1972
E03	Coffee and Brioche	October 15, 1972
E04	Brunch for a Bunch	October 22, 1972
E05	VIP Cake [Le Brantome]	October 29, 1972
E06	To Ragoût a Goose	November 5, 1972
E07	Sudden Company	November 12, 1972
E08	First Course Sit Down Dinner	November 19, 1972
E09	Main Course Sit Down Dinner	November 26, 1972
E10	Grand Finale Sit Down Dinner	December 3, 1972
E11	Kids Want to Cook	December 10, 1972
E12	Two-Dollar Banquet	January 7, 1973
E13	Puff Pastry to Go	January 14, 1973

== Companion books ==
Two companion cookbooks were written along with the show. The French Chef Cookbook was a show-by-show breakdown of the black and white series, while From Julia Child's Kitchen was a somewhat more ambitious work that was based on the color series but also added considerable extra material.

== DVD releases ==
- Julia Child's Kitchen Wisdom (2000)
- Julia and Jacques: Cooking at Home (2003)
- Julia Child: America's Favorite Chef (2004)
- The French Chef: Volume One (2005)
- The French Chef: Volume Two (2005)
- Julia Child! The French Chef (2006)
- The French Chef: Julia Child's French Classics (2012)
