= Julia Child: Home Cooking With Master Chefs =

- Developer: Microsoft
- Release: August 1995
- Operating system: Macintosh, Windows

Julia Child: Home Cooking With Master Chefs is a software CD-ROM from Microsoft. It was released in August 1995 and features Julia Child and 16 other chefs.

== Summary ==
Julia Child: Home Cooking With Master Chefs allows the user to search the index by recipe, chef, or course, and watch video bios of each chef.

== Reception ==
CNET called Julia Child: Home Cooking With Master Chefs the next best thing to having a four-star chef right in your own kitchen. Evansville Courier and Press found the little amount of Julia Child footage dissapointing.
