= The Way to Cook =

Cookbook and series of videos

- Genre: Non-fiction, instructional video
- Created by: Julia Child
- Written by: Julia Child
- Directed by: Russell Morash
- Original language: English

Production
- Running time: 6 hours
- Production company: Knopf

Original release
- Release: 1985

The Way to Cook is a series of six instructional videos about cooking produced in 1985 and a companion cookbook published in 1989, both featuring the television personality and cooking teacher Julia Child.

== Television ==
The video series was produced with and marketed by the WGBH Educational Foundation in Boston, producers of Child's previous television series The French Chef, but was shot at Child's home in Santa Barbara, California. The book was published by Alfred A. Knopf, the firm that published almost all of Child's work from the beginning to the end of her career.

=== Home video releases ===
The videos were originally available only as a set of six videotapes. In December 2009, they were re-released as a set of two DVDs.

== Book ==
The Way To Cook
- 1993 The Way to Cook hardcover (Knopf)
- Author: Julia Child
- Language: English
- Subject: Culinary arts
- Genre: Non-fiction
- Publisher: Alfred A. Knopf
- Publication date: 1989 (hardcover)
- Publication place: United States
- Media type: book
- Pages: 511
- ISBN: 0-394-53264-3 (hardcover)
- OCLC: 18813917
- Dewey Decimal: 641.5 19
- LC Class: TX651 .C53 1989
- Preceded by: Julia Child & More Company
- Followed by: Cooking with Master Chefs

The book The Way To Cook differs from her previous book Mastering the Art of French Cooking in numerous ways. While Mastering was a collaboration that co-authors Simone Beck and Louisette Bertholle had gotten underway before Child's involvement, The Way To Cook was a solo work written entirely by Child during the late 1980s. Another difference was that The Way To Cook did not focus entirely on French cuisine, on which her reputation had been built, but added a substantial number of recipes for traditional American dishes, especially those of New England, where Child's mother had come from and where Child had spent much of her life. In this, the book reflected the diversification of the cooking repertoire on Child's television show, Julia Child & Company, that had taken place since its premiere in 1978.

The book provided a focus on "master recipes"—that is, recipes that illustrate broad principles in cooking—with other recipes provided as variations on those same themes. The book also made use of improved cookware designs and of new technology such as the food processor, of which Child was a major proponent.

== See also ==
- Food writing
- Haute cuisine
