= Royal William rose =

Rose cultivar

Rosa 'KORzaun'
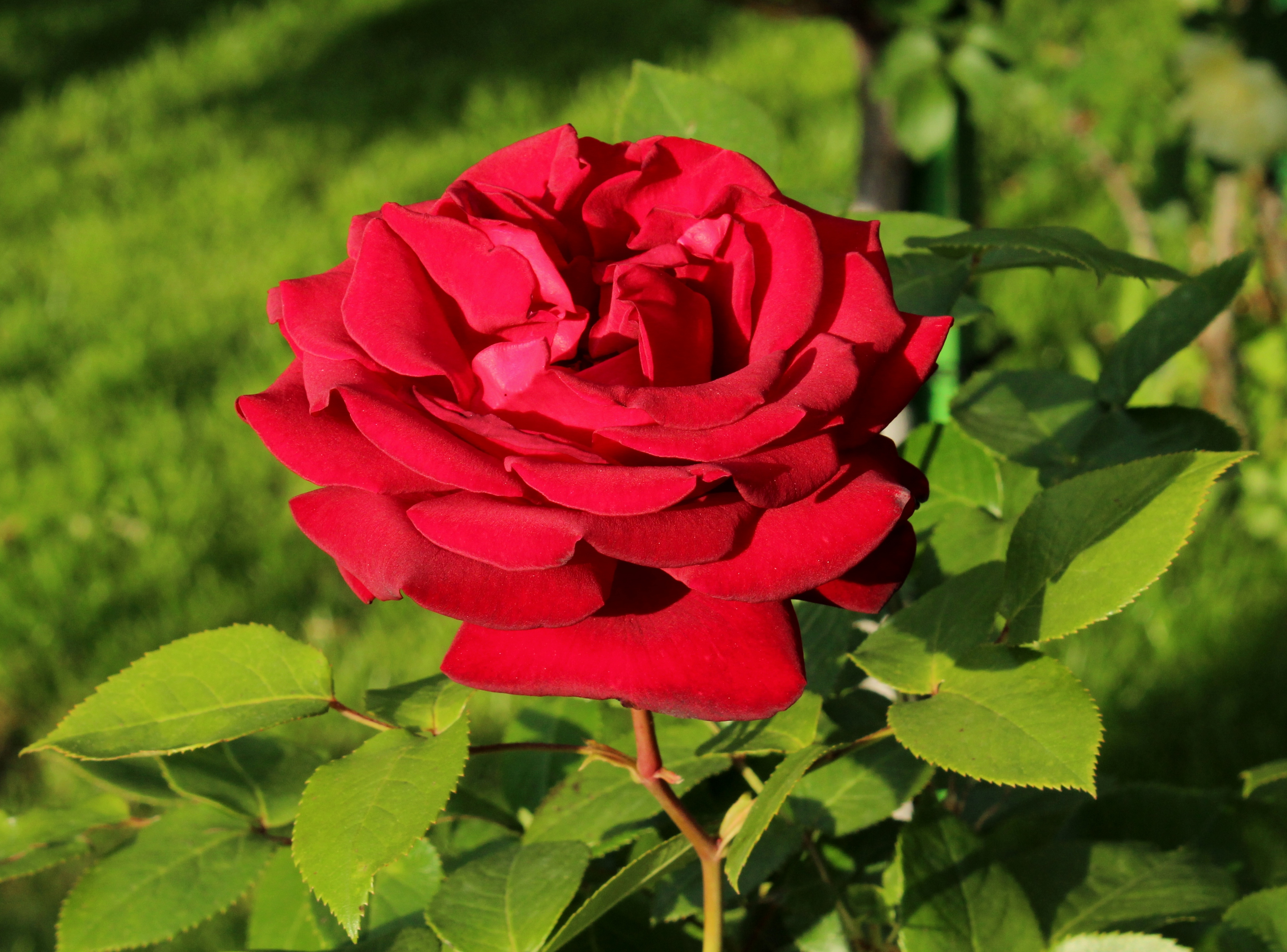
- Genus: Rosa
- Hybrid parentage: 'Feuerzauber' × Seedling
- Cultivar group: Hybrid Tea
- Cultivar: 'KORzaun'
- Marketing names: Royal William, Fragrant Charm, Duftzauber, La Magie du Parfum, Leonora Christine
- Breeder: Reimer Kordes, 1984

The Royal William rose, registered under the cultivar name "KORzaun", is a red hybrid tea rose. It was developed by Reimer Kordes from the cultivar 'Feuerzauber' (Kordes 1973) and is available under several other marketing names, such as Fragrant Charm, Duftzauber, La Magie du Parfum and Leonora Christine.

According to The Ultimate Rose Book, the rose was introduced in 1982, the year of the birth of Prince William, then second in the line of succession to the British throne. It has been planted in Savill Garden in Windsor Great Park in celebration of the wedding of Prince William and Catherine Middleton.

The dark red flowers develop from even darker, pointed buds. They reach an average diameter of 13 centimetres (5.1 in) and have a strong fragrance. The vigorous shrub has dark green foliage, reaches a height of 75–125 centimetres (30–49 in) at a width of 60–75 centimetres (24–30 in), is winter hardy up to −20 °C (−4 °F) (USDA zone 6b) and very disease resistant. Due to their long, solid stems, the roses are well suited as cut flowers.

== Awards ==
Royal William was granted several awards, including the Fragrance Award in Monza (1985) and The Hague (1987). The Royal Horticultural Society awarded the cultivar the title Best of the Best in 1987 – jointly with 'Sweet Magic' – and the Award of Garden Merit in 1993.
