= Julia Child's kitchen =

Exhibit at National Museum of American History

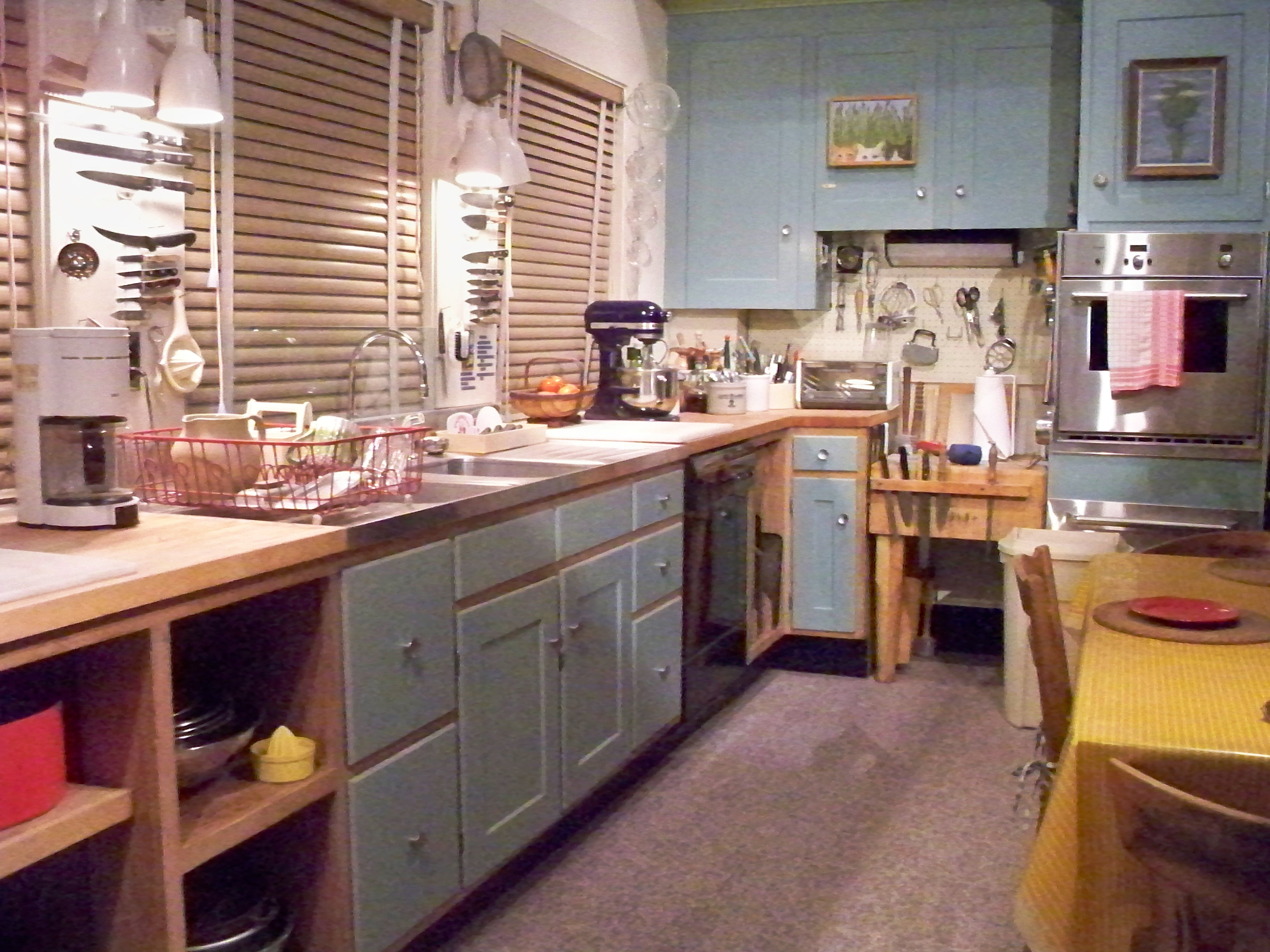

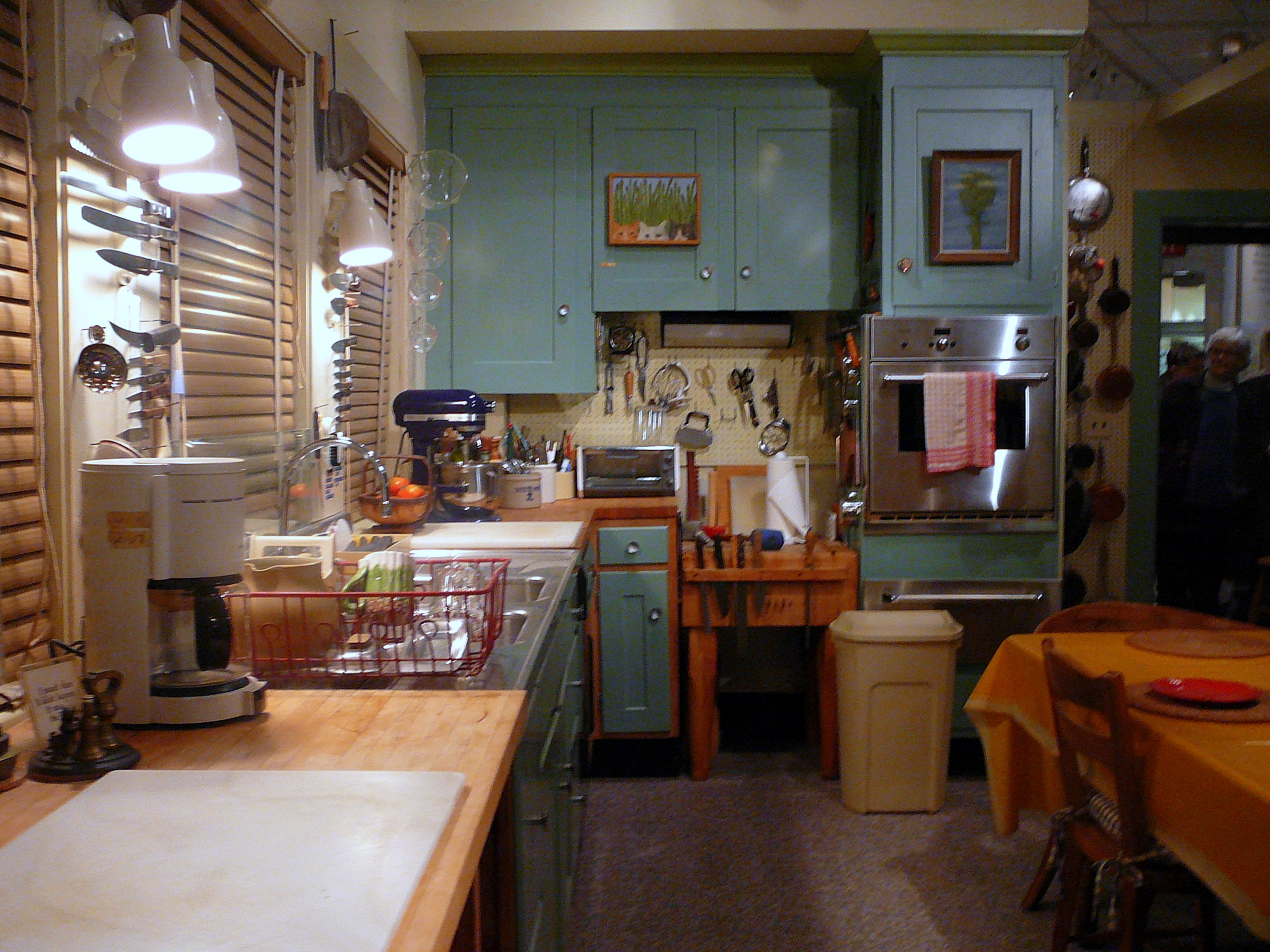

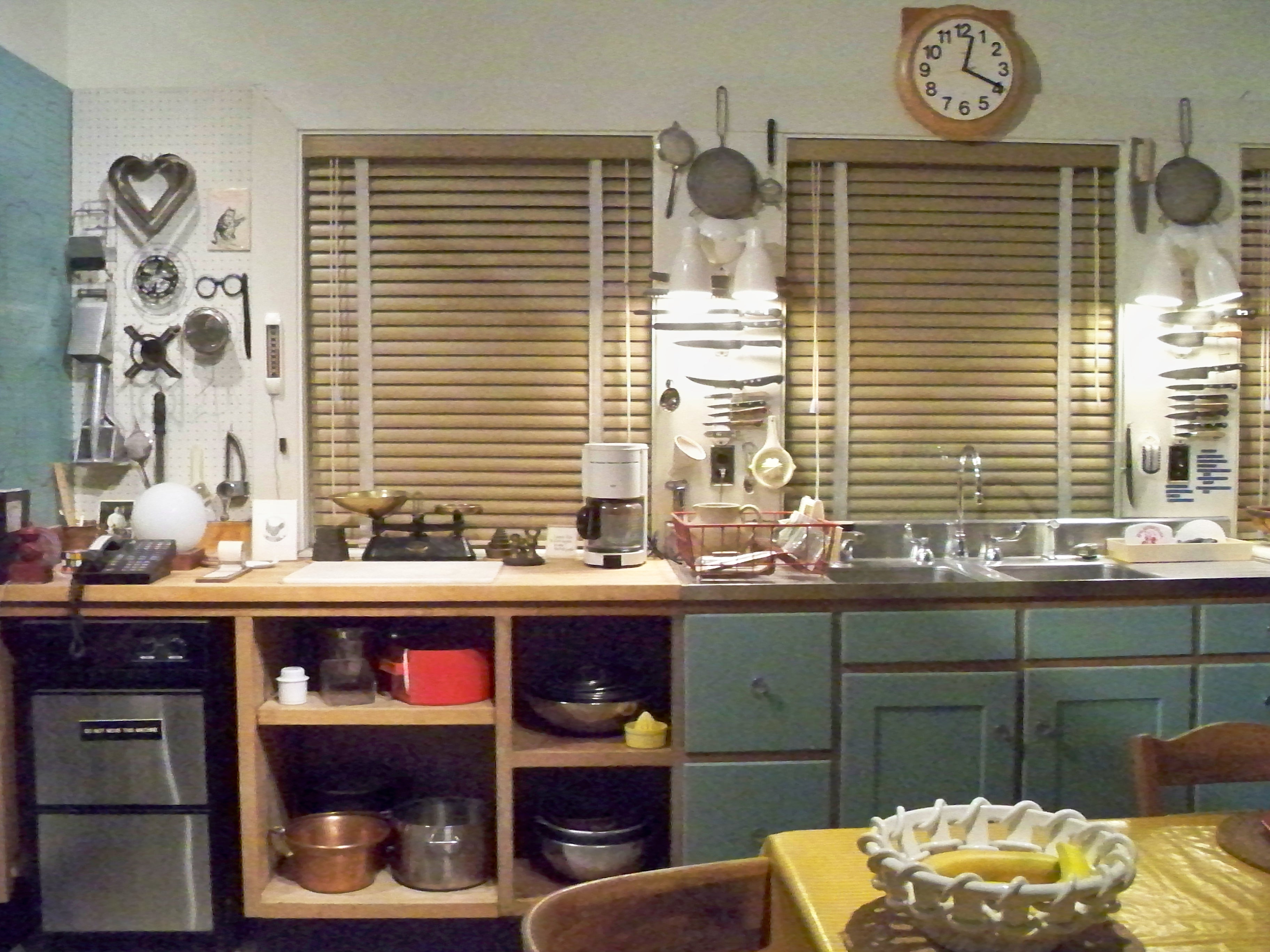

Julia Child's kitchen is a historic artifact on display on the ground floor of the Smithsonian Institution's National Museum of American History: Kenneth E. Behring Center, located in Washington, D.C., on the National Mall. The kitchen is not a replica, but is the actual kitchen used by noted 20th-century cookbook author and cooking show host Julia Child, appearing as the backdrop to several of her television shows.

== History ==
Built in Child's home on Irving Street in Cambridge, Massachusetts in 1961, the kitchen was designed by her husband, Paul Cushing Child with 38-inch (97 cm) high countertops, rather than the standard 36-inch (91 cm) height, for her 6-foot-2-inch (1.88 m) frame. Paul also selected the light blue-green color scheme dominating the kitchen's panels.

It was the setting for three of her television shows: In Julia's Kitchen with Master Chefs, Baking With Julia, and Julia and Jacques Cooking at Home with Jacques Pépin. The kitchen was fully transformed into a functional set, with TV-quality lighting, three cameras positioned to catch all angles in the room, and a massive center island with a gas stovetop on one side and an electric stovetop on the other, but leaving the rest of the Childs' appliances alone, including the "wall oven with its squeaking door." During taping, the kitchen table and chairs were removed and replaced by a cooking island that had a built-in stovetop and food preparation surfaces. This kitchen backdrop hosted nearly all of Child's 1990s television series.

In August 2001, representatives of the Smithsonian Institution met with Child in her home, where she agreed to donate her kitchen to the Institution, where it is now on display. Shortly after Child's 90th birthday, on August 18 and 19, 2002, Child attended the opening of the display of her kitchen. Her iconic copper pots and pans were on display at Copia in Napa, California, until August 2009 when they were reunited with her kitchen at the National Museum of American History.
