= Julia Child rose =

Rose cultivar

Rosa 'Julia Child'
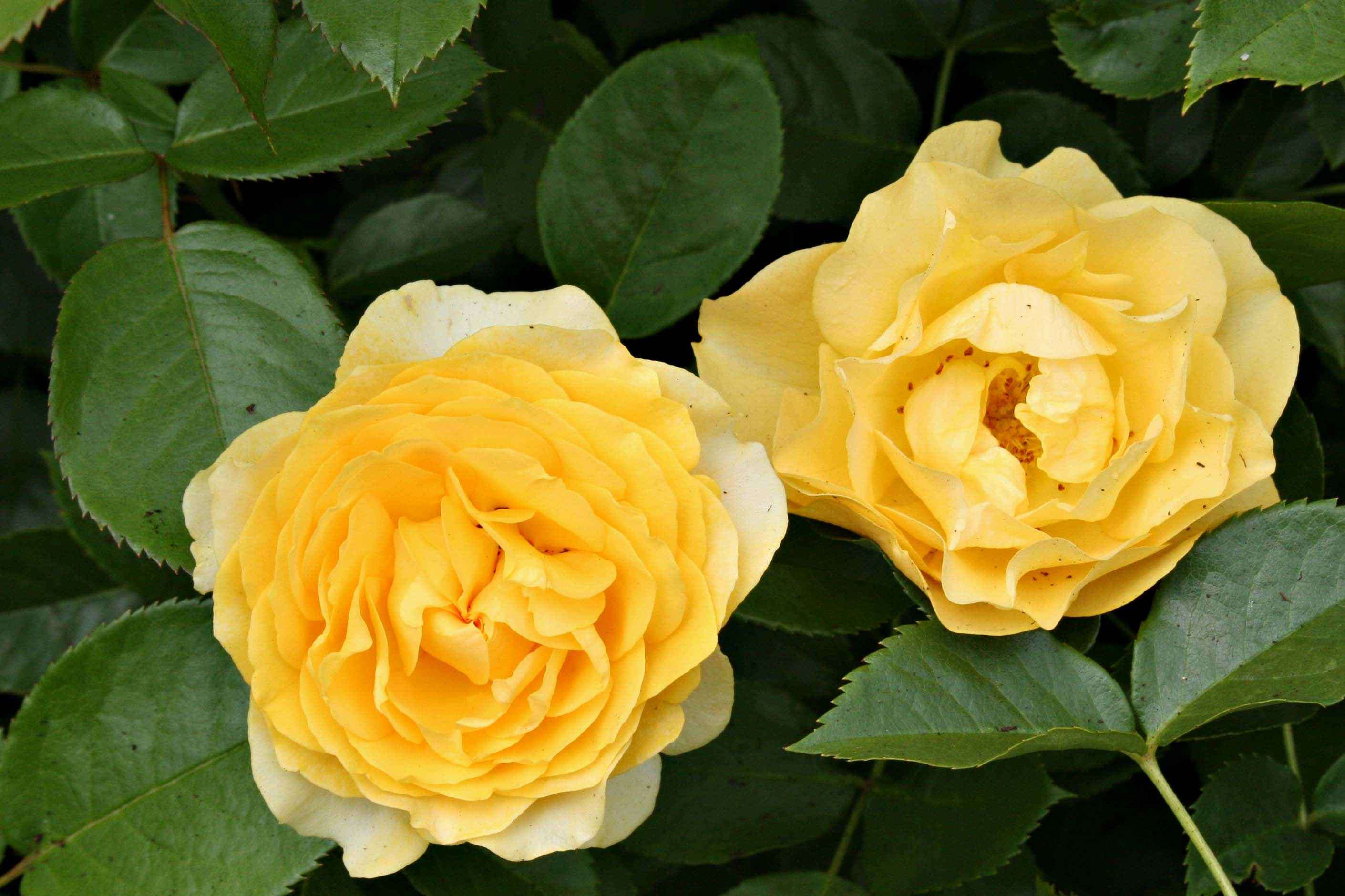
- Julia Child Rose
- Genus: Rosa
- Hybrid parentage: Seed: ('Voodoo' × Hybrid of R. soulieana) × 'Summerwine' Pollen: 'Top Notch' ™
- Cultivar: 'WEKvossutono'
- Marketing names: 'Absolutely Fabulous' 'Anisade' ® 'Jiřina Bohdalová' 'SASOL Rose' (South Africa) 'Soul Mate'
- Origin: Tom Carruth (United States, 2004)

The Julia Child rose, known in the UK as the Absolutely Fabulous rose, is a golden butter or golden floribunda rose, named after the chef Julia Child.

== History ==
This variety was bred by the American Tom Carruth in 2004. It was introduced into the United States by Weeks Wholesale Rose Grower, Inc. in 2006. And in Australia by Swane's Nursery/Swane Bros Pty Ltd as "Soul Mate" in 2009 In the United Kingdom, the rose was renamed after the popular TV show Absolutely Fabulous. The stock parents of this rose are ((Voodoo x Hybrid of R. soulieana) x Summerwine) x Topnotch. Celebrity chef Julia Child personally chose this floribunda rose to bear her name.

== Presentation and care ==
The Julia Child cultivar features golden flowers produced in clusters that repeat all season long. Flowers are medium size, full, (26–40 petals), cup shaped, and globular. The small, round bush has foliage that is bright green and glossy. The bush grows to a height of 26" to 31" (65 to 80 cm), with a spread of 20" to 26" (50 to 65 cm). It could grow larger in warmer climates. Usually climates with warmer temperatures offer the roses a longer season, thus allowing them to get much larger than they would in a shorter season. The bright green foliage makes a nice backdrop for the buttery yellow flowers. It is used in borders, garden beds, containers, and as a cut flower. It is a popular landscaping plant, because of its bright yellow color, disease resistance, and constant bloom. The Julia Child rose is heat tolerant, with excellent resistance to blackspot and mildew. It is hardy (USDA zone 4a through 10a). Free-flowering, the rose is known for its old-fashioned form and sweet licorice fragrance.

Removing faded blooms (deadheading) forces the plant to produce more flowers. Only minimal pruning is needed to maintain its shape.

== Awards ==
The cultivar is a 2006 AARS (All American Rose Selections) winner. It was selected as Best of the Best in 2010, and won the Gold Star of the South Pacific in the 2011 New Zealand Rose Trials.

== Patents ==
In Australia, the Julia Child rose is patented under Application No: 2009/219 since 2009. In the United States, the cultivar has a patent pending, United States-Patent No: PP 18,473, submitted on Feb. 5 2008.

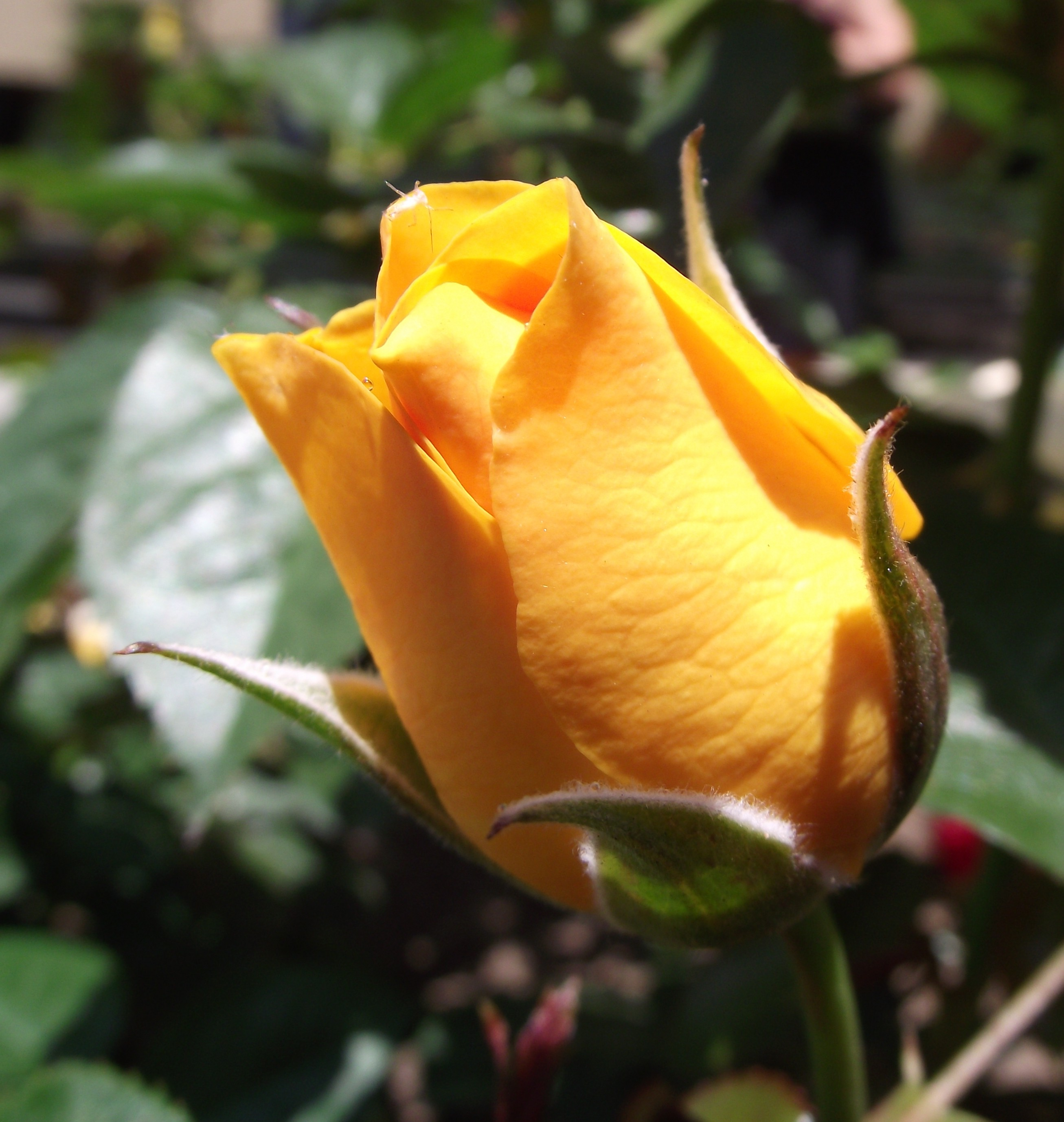
San Diego County Fair, California, USA

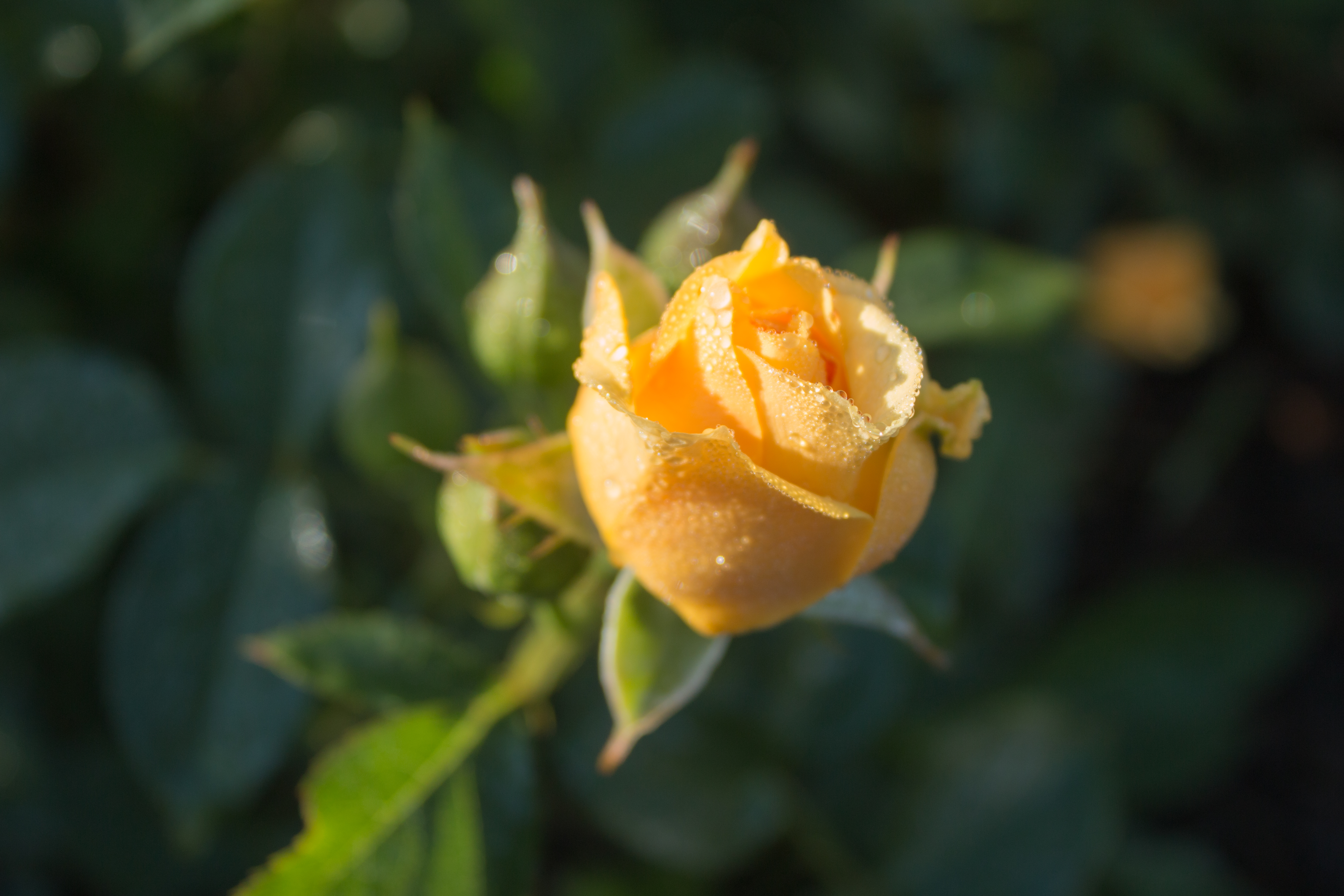
New Hampshire, USA

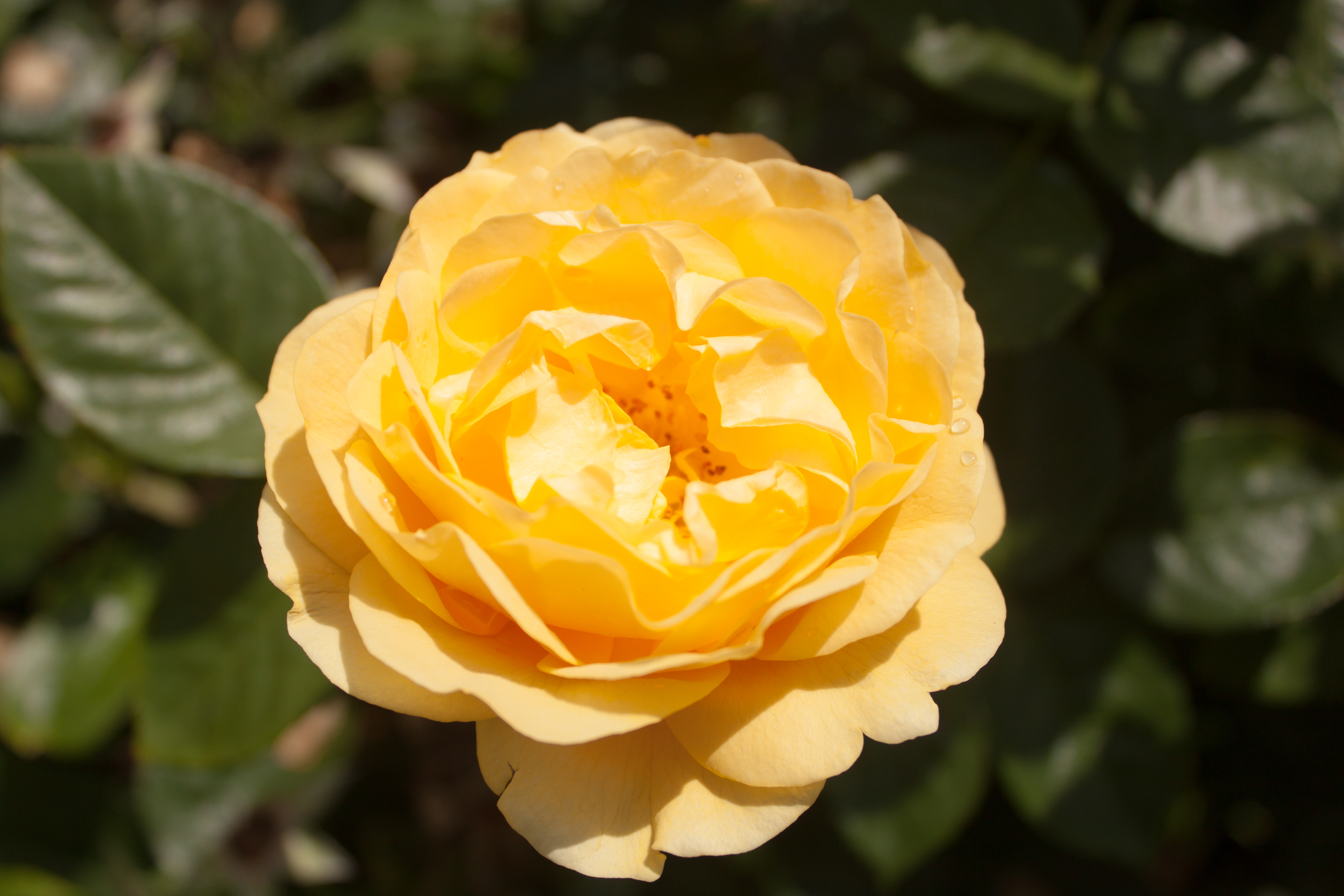
Regents Park, London, England

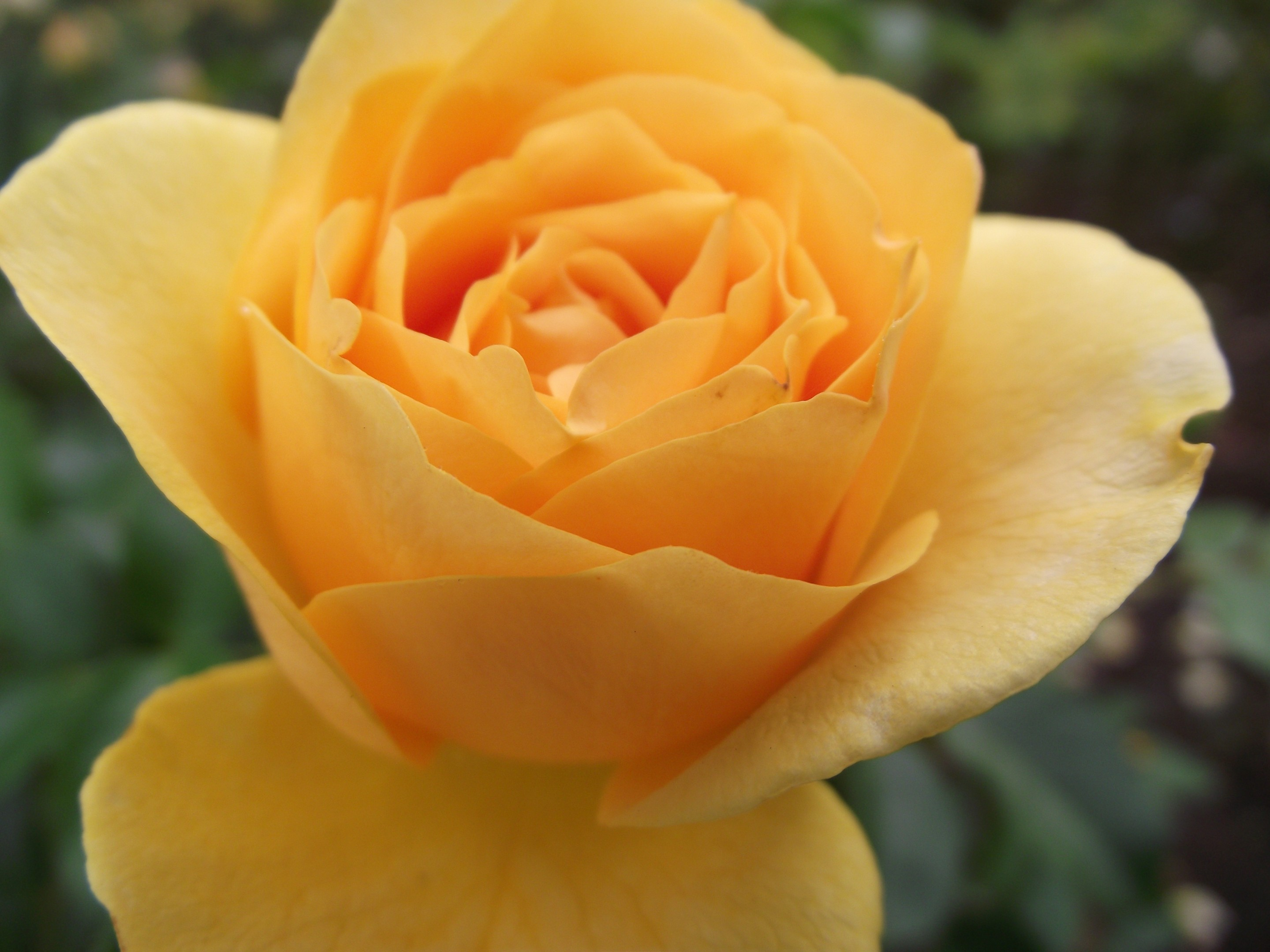
Inez Parker Rose Garden, San Diego, USA
