= Norman Love =

American pastry chef and chocolatier

Norman Love is an American pastry chef located in Fort Myers, Florida.

== Career ==
Love served as corporate executive pastry chef for Ritz-Carlton from 1991 to 2001, opening hotel pastry kitchens in such locations as Boston, Dubai and Bali. Love left Ritz-Carlton after 10 years to focus on the culinary event production company, Carymax LLC, with co-founder Michael Schneider. The company's pastry competitions were a hit with viewers and became the basis for the TV series Food Network Challenge.

Love was one of only 26 selected to appear on Julia Child's show "Baking with Julia" on PBS, creating Banana Stuffed Cinnamon Sugar Beignets. In addition, Godiva Chocolatier has Love create a limited edition line of chocolates that they label as their exclusive "G" Collection. Flavors include Lemon Drop, Tart Raspberry, Bananas Foster, Apple Pie, Tahitian Vanilla, P.B. & Jam, Salted Caramel, Caramel Macchiato. Furthermore, almost every chocolatier who makes shell-molded chocolates has at least one piece that uses one of the techniques that Love has perfected.
While there are only four storefronts (Naples, Estero, and two in Fort Myers, FL), Norman Love Confections can be found in other locations across the country.

=== Norman Love Confectionery ===
In 2001, Love founded Norman Love Confections (originally named Ganache Chocolates) with Sarasota-based pastry chef Judy Limekiller. The co-owners began producing unique ultra-premium chocolates for hotels, resorts, and restaurants, but quickly found success with retail customers. In February 2002, USA Today named Ganache Chocolates one of the top 10 artisan chocolate companies in the country. Schneider, who was editor-in-chief of Chocolatier magazine at the time, was a primary source for the story. With a reputation for excellence and his network of connections in the industry, it wasn't long before Love was approached by Godiva to design limited-edition flavors for their "G" line. In 2004, Love renamed the chocolate company "Norman Love Confections", and he and Limekiller parted ways. Following this transformation, Love continued to build his brand and utilized product placement at charity events to generate visibility in his community. In February 2005, Norman Love Confections was rated one of the top three chocolate companies in the country by Consumer Reports.

The company subsequently implemented Wherefour’s ERP system to manage production, traceability and inventory, integrating it with Salesforce Order Management on the Salesforce platform and ShipStation for shipping, Stripe for payments, Sage Intacct for accounting and Avalara’s AvaTax system for tax calculation.
