= Rose of the Year =

British horticultural award

The Rose of the Year is an award is given annually by the British Association of Rose Breeders. From 1982 to 2001, the British Association of Rose Breeders and the British Group of the HTA granted the title Rose of the Year. Between 1984 and 2001, the title Best of the Best was granted if the selected rose was an established cultivar, which remained popular over several years. Since 2002, the title Best of the Best is granted.

== List ==
Awarded in	Title	Cultivar Name	Hybridiser	Intro Year	Cultivar Group	Picture
1982	Rose of the Year	'Mountbatten'	Harkness	1982	Floribunda	
1983	Rose of the Year	'Beautiful Britain'	Dickson	1983	Floribunda	
1984	Best of the Best	'Amber Queen'	Harkness Roses	1984	Floribunda	
1985	Best of the Best	'Polar Star'	Tantau	1982	Hybrid tea	
1986	Rose of the Year	'Gentle Touch'	Dickson	1986	Floribunda	
1987	Best of the Best	'Sweet Magic'	Dickson	1986	Floribunda	
1987	Best of the Best	Royal William	Kordes	1984	Hybrid tea	
1988	Best of the Best	'Sweet Dream'	Fryer	1987	Mini-Flora	
1989	Rose of the Year	'Glad Tidings'	Tantau	1988	Floribunda	
1990	Rose of the Year	'Harvest Fayre'	Dickson	1989	Floribunda	
1991	Rose of the Year	'Melody Maker'	Dickson	1990	Floribunda	
1992	Rose of the Year	'Top Marks'	Fryer	1992	Miniature rose	
1993	Best of the Best	'Dawn Chorus'	Dickson	1991	Hybrid tea	
1994	Rose of the Year	'Festival'	Kordes	1994	Mini-Flora	
1995	Rose of the Year	'Chatsworth'	Tantau	1990	Shrub rose	
1996	Rose of the Year	'Magic Carpet'	Jackson & Perkins	1993	Shrub rose	
1997	Rose of the Year	'Sunset Boulevard'	Harkness	1997	Floribunda	
1998	Best of the Best	'Penny Lane'	Harkness	1998	Climber	
1999	Rose of the Year	'Fascination'	Olesen	1989	Floribunda	
2000	Rose of the Year	'Irish Eyes'	Dickson	1999	Floribunda	
2001	Rose of the Year	'Great Expectations '	McGredy	2001	Floribunda	
2002	Best of the Best	'Simply The Best'	McGredy	1998	Hybrid Tea	
2003	Best of the Best	'Rhapsody In Blue'	Cowlishaw	1999	Shrub rose	
2004	Best of the Best	'Golden Memories'	Kordes	2002	Floribunda	
2005	Best of the Best	'Summertime'	Warner	2003	Climbing miniature	
2006	Best of the Best	'Champagne Moment'	Kordes	1999	Floribunda	
2006	Best of the Best	'Hot Chocolate'	Carruth	2002	Floribunda	
2007	Best of the Best	'Tickled Pink'	Fryer	2006	Floribunda	
2008	Best of the Best	'Sweet Haze'	Tantau	1997	Shrub rose	
2009	Best of the Best	'Lucky!'	Fryer	2005	Floribunda	
2010	Best of the Best	'Super Trouper'	Fryer	2008	Floribunda	
2010	Best of the Best	'Julia Child'	Carruth	2004	Floribunda	
2011	Best of the Best	'Joie de Vivre'	Kordes	1997	Shrub rose	
2012	Best of the Best	'Moment in Time'	Kordes	2011	Floribunda	
2013	Best of the Best	'You're Beautiful'	Fryer	2007	Floribunda	
2014	Best of the Best	'Lady Marmalade'	Harkness	2013	Floribunda	
2015	Best of the Best	'For Your Eyes Only'	Warner	2014	Floribunda	
2016	Best of the Best	'Sunny Sky'	Kordes	2014		
2017	Rose of the Year	'Scent from Heaven'	Warner	2016	Climber	
2018	Rose of the Year	'Lovestruck'	Zary	2007	Floribunda	
2018	Rose of the Year	'Starlight Symphony'	Harkness Roses	2018	Climbing rose	

== See also ==
- Garden roses
- All-America Rose Selections
- American Garden Rose Selections
- List of Award of Garden Merit roses
