= Little Jewel (Georgetown) =

Historic houses in Washington, D.C., United States

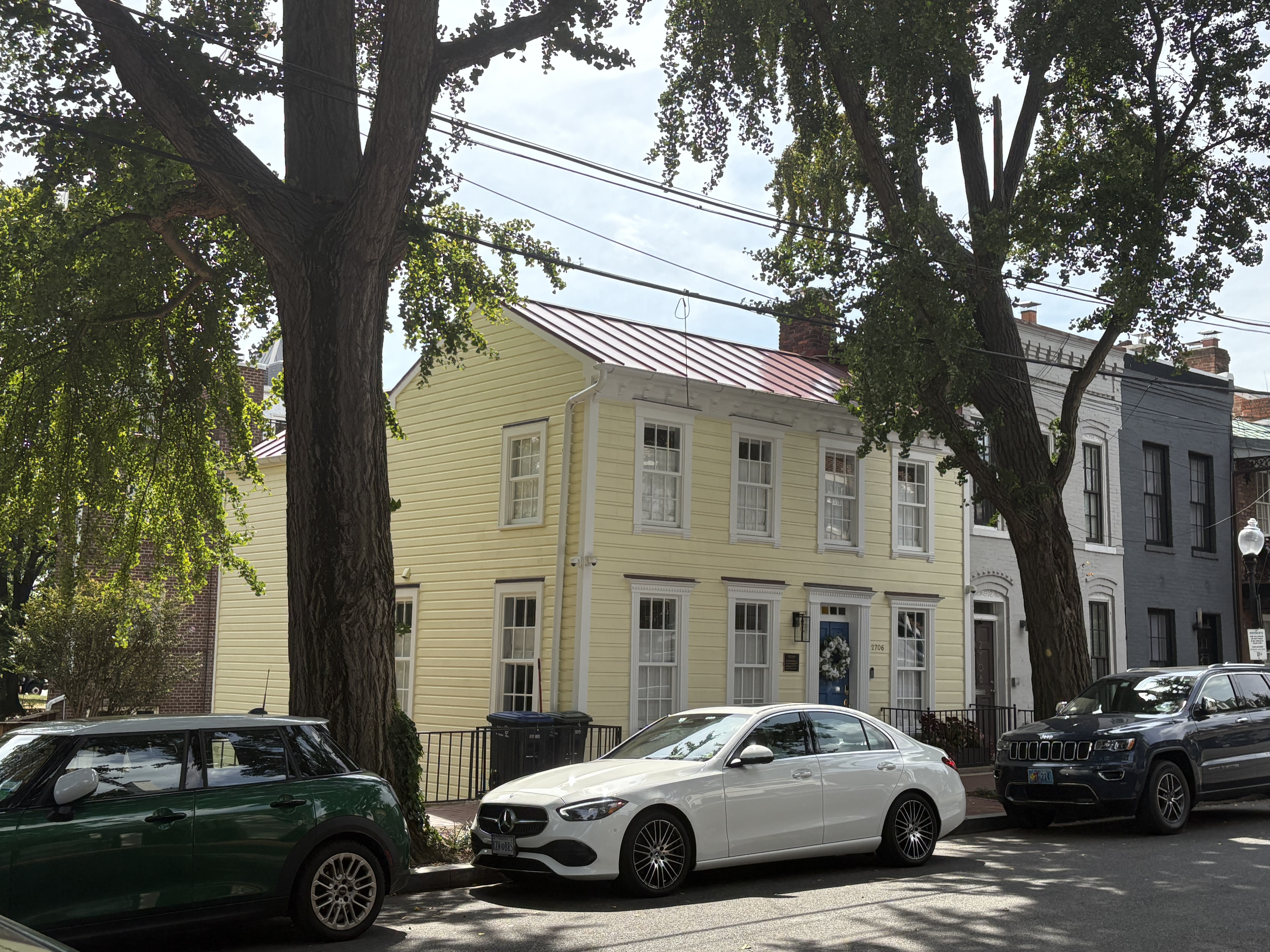
- North façade facing Olive St NW
- Location: 2706 Olive St NW; Washington, D.C.
- Built: c. 1869-70
- Architect: Edgar Murphy
- Architectural style: Federal

The Little Jewel is a historic house, built c. 1869-70 by Black and West Virginian carpenter Edgar Murphy, in the Georgetown neighborhood of Washington, D.C. It is a frame and clapboard structure painted yellow of two storeys with a basement, four bays wide, with six-over-six sash windows throughout. This house is most notable for being the residence of Julia Child and her husband from 1948 to 1959, and the first property they owned.
