= Julia Child =

American cooking personality (1912–2004)

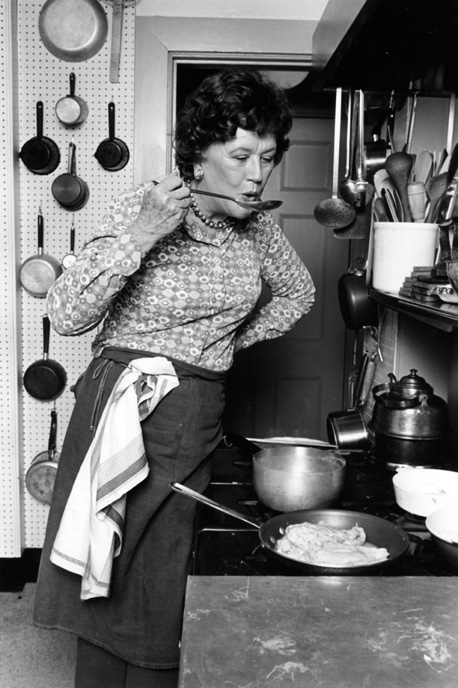
- Child in 1978
- Born: Julia Carolyn McWilliams; August 15, 1912; Pasadena, California, U.S.
- Died: August 13, 2004 (aged 91); Montecito, California, U.S.
- Education: Smith College (BA); Le Cordon Bleu (Diplôme de Cuisine)
- Occupations: Chef; author; television personality
- Years active: 1951–2004
- Spouse: Paul Cushing Child (m. 1946; died 1994)
- Culinary career
- Cooking style: French
- Television shows
- The French Chef; "Julia Child: bon appétit"; Julia Child & Company; Julia Child & More Company; Dinner at Julia's; Cooking with Master Chefs; In Julia's Kitchen with Master Chefs; Baking with Julia; Julia & Jacques Cooking at Home
- Awards
- Daytime Emmy Award for Outstanding Service Show Host; 1996 In Julia's Kitchen with Master Chefs; 2001 Julia & Jacques Cooking at Home; Emmy Award for Achievements in Educational Television—Individuals; 1966 The French Chef; Peabody Award; 1965 The French Chef; National Book Award, Current Interest; 1980 Julia Child and More Company; U.S. Presidential Medal of Freedom
- Awards: Meritorious Civilian Service Award; Legion of Honour – Knight (2000)
- Espionage activity
- Allegiance: United States
- Service branch: Office of Strategic Services
- Service years: 1942–1945
- Rank: CAF–7

Julia Carolyn Child (née McWilliams; August 15, 1912 – August 13, 2004) was an American chef, author, and television personality. She is recognized for having brought French cuisine to the American public with her debut cookbook, Mastering the Art of French Cooking, and her subsequent television programs, the most notable of which was The French Chef, which premiered in 1963 and ran for almost ten years.

== Early Life ==
Child was born Julia Carolyn McWilliams on August 15, 1912, in Pasadena, California. Her father was John McWilliams Jr. (1880–1962), a Princeton University graduate and prominent land manager, and her mother was Julia Carolyn ("Caro") Weston (1877–1937), a paper-company heiress and daughter of Byron Curtis Weston, a lieutenant governor of Massachusetts. She was the eldest of three, followed by a brother, John McWilliams III, and a sister, Dorothy Cousins.

Child attended Polytechnic School and Westridge School from 4th grade to 9th grade in Pasadena. In high school, she was sent to the Katherine Branson School in Ross, California, which was at the time a boarding school. As a youth, she played tennis, golf, and basketball.

Child also played sports while attending Smith College in Northampton, Massachusetts, from which she graduated in 1934 with a major in history. At the time she graduated, she planned to become a novelist, or perhaps a magazine writer. Following her graduation from college, Child moved to New York City, where she worked for a time as a copywriter for the advertising department of W. & J. Sloane. She was still hoping to become a novelist. Child joined the Junior League of Pasadena in 1935 after returning home from college. While a member, she contributed to the League's magazine and helped create children's plays.

While Child grew up in a family with a cook, she did not observe or learn cooking from this person, and she would not learn until she met her husband-to-be, Paul, who grew up in a family very interested in food.

== Career ==
=== Second World War ===
Child joined the Office of Strategic Services (OSS) in 1942 after finding that at 6 feet 2 inches (1.88 m), she was too tall to enlist in the Women's Army Corps (WACs) or in the U.S. Navy's WAVES. She began her OSS career as a typist at its headquarters in Washington, D.C., but, because of her education and experience, was soon given a position as a top-secret researcher working directly for the head of OSS, General William J. Donovan.

As a research assistant in the Secret Intelligence division, Child typed over 10,000 names on white note cards to keep track of officers. For a year, she worked at the OSS Emergency Sea Rescue Equipment Section (ESRES) in Washington, D.C. as a file clerk and then as an assistant to developers of a shark repellent needed to ensure that sharks would not explode ordnance targeting German U-boats. When Child was asked to solve the problem of too many OSS underwater explosives being set off by curious sharks, "Child's solution was to experiment with cooking various concoctions as a shark repellent," which were sprinkled in the water near the explosives and repelled sharks. Still in use, the experimental shark repellent "marked Child's first foray into the world of cooking."

During 1944–1945, Child was posted to Kandy, Ceylon (now Sri Lanka), where her responsibilities included "registering, cataloging and channeling a great volume of highly classified communications" for the OSS's clandestine stations in Asia. She was later posted to Kunming, China, where she received the Emblem of Meritorious Civilian Service as head of the Registry of the OSS Secretariat.

For her service, Child received an award that cited her many virtues, including her "drive and inherent cheerfulness". As with other OSS records, her file was declassified in 2008. Unlike other files, Child's complete file is available online.

While she was in Kandy, she met Paul Cushing Child, who was also an OSS employee. The two later married on September 1, 1946, in Lumberville, Pennsylvania, later moving to a house in the Georgetown neighborhood of Washington, D.C. Paul, a New Jersey native who had lived in Paris as an artist and poet, was known for his sophisticated palate and had introduced his wife to fine cuisine. He joined the United States Foreign Service, and, in 1948, the couple moved to Paris after the State Department assigned Paul there as an exhibits officer with the United States Information Agency. The couple had no children.

=== Postwar France ===
Child repeatedly recalled her first meal at La Couronne in Rouen as a culinary revelation. Once, she had described the meal of oysters, sole meunière, and fine wine to The New York Times as "an opening up of the soul and spirit for me." In 1951, she graduated from the famous Cordon Bleu cooking school in Paris and later studied privately with Max Bugnard and other master chefs. She joined the women's cooking club Le Cercle des Gourmettes, through which she met Simone Beck, who was writing a French cookbook for Americans with her friend Louisette Bertholle. Beck proposed that Child work with them to make the book appeal to Americans. In 1951, Child, Beck, and Bertholle began to teach cooking to American women in Child's Paris kitchen, calling their informal school L'école des trois gourmandes (The School of the Three Food Lovers). For the next decade, as the Childs moved around Europe and finally to Cambridge, Massachusetts in 1961, the three researched and repeatedly tested recipes. Child translated the French into English, making the recipes detailed, interesting, and practical.

In 1963, the Childs built a home near the Provence town of Plascassier in the hills above Cannes on property belonging to co-author Beck and her husband, Jean Fischbacher. The Childs named it "La Pitchoune", a Provençal word meaning "the little one", but over time the property was often affectionately called simply "La Peetch".

=== Avis DeVoto ===
Avis DeVoto was an American culinary editor, book reviewer, and cook. In 1952, DeVoto received a letter from Julia Child, at that time living in Paris, responding to one of her husband Bernard's recent magazine columns on how he detested stainless steel knives; Child thought he was “100% right”. DeVoto's reply to the letter initiated the correspondence and lifelong friendship between the two women. DeVoto and Child would not meet in person until 1954, but during those first two years they exchanged around 120 letters, which were eventually compiled into a book, As Always, Julia (2010).

DeVoto served as an early reader and editor for Child's forthcoming cookbook, Mastering the Art of French Cooking, and her editorial connections would help Child and her co-authors Louisette Bertholle and Simone Beck sign a contract with Houghton Mifflin in 1954. When the publishing company rejected the book, DeVoto helped push for the Alfred A. Knopf editor Judith Jones to accept it for publication. Jones would become Child's advocate for the rest of her career.

=== Media career ===
External media

Images
- Julia Child (Photos by Lee Lockwood, Getty Images )

Audio
- Julia Child On France, Fat And Food On The Floor, November 14, 1989, 10:13, Fresh Air with Terry Gross

Video
- French Chef; Lasagne a la Francaise, November 25, 1970, 28:37, WGBH Open Vault

The three would-be authors initially signed a contract with publisher Houghton Mifflin, which later rejected the manuscript for seeming too much like an encyclopedia. When it was finally published in 1961 by Alfred A. Knopf, the 726-page Mastering the Art of French Cooking was a best-seller and received critical acclaim that derived in part from the American interest in French culture in the early 1960s. Lauded for its helpful illustrations and precise attention to detail, and for making fine cuisine accessible, the book is still in print and is considered a seminal culinary work. Following this success, Child wrote magazine articles and a regular column for The Boston Globe newspaper. She would go on to publish nearly twenty titles under her name and with others. Many, though not all, were related to her television shows. Her last book was the autobiographical My Life in France, published posthumously in 2006 and written with her grandnephew, Alex Prud'homme. The book recounts Child's life with her husband, Paul Cushing Child, in postwar France.

=== The French Chef and related books ===
A 1961 appearance on a book review show on what was then the National Educational Television (NET) station of Boston, WGBH-TV (now a major Public Broadcasting Service station), led to the inception of her first television cooking show after viewers enjoyed her demonstration of how to cook an omelette. The French Chef debuted as a summer pilot series, on July 26, 1962. This led to the program becoming a regular series, beginning on February 11, 1963, on WGBH, where it was immediately successful. The show ran nationally for ten years and won Peabody and Emmy Awards, including the first Emmy award for an educational program. Though she was not the first television cook, Child was the most widely seen. She attracted the broadest audience with her cheery enthusiasm, distinctively warbly voice, and unpatronizing, unaffected manner. In 1972, The French Chef became the first television program to be captioned for the deaf, using the preliminary technology of open-captioning.

Child's second book, The French Chef Cookbook, was a collection of the recipes she had demonstrated on the show. It was soon followed in 1970 by Mastering the Art of French Cooking, Volume Two, again in collaboration with Simone Beck, but not with Louisette Bertholle, with whom the professional relationship had ended. Child's fourth book, From Julia Child's Kitchen, was illustrated with her husband's photographs and documented the color series of The French Chef, as well as an extensive library of kitchen notes compiled by Child during the course of the show.

=== Impact on American households ===
Child had a large impact on American households and housewives. Because of the technology in the 1960s, the show was unedited, causing her blunders to appear in the final version and ultimately lend "authenticity and approachability to television." According to Toby Miller in "Screening Food: French Cuisine and the Television Palate," one mother he spoke to said that sometimes "all that stood between me and insanity was hearty Julia Child" because of Child's ability to soothe and transport her. In addition, Miller notes that Child's show began before the feminist movement of the 1960s, which meant that the issues housewives and women faced were somewhat ignored on television.

=== Later career ===
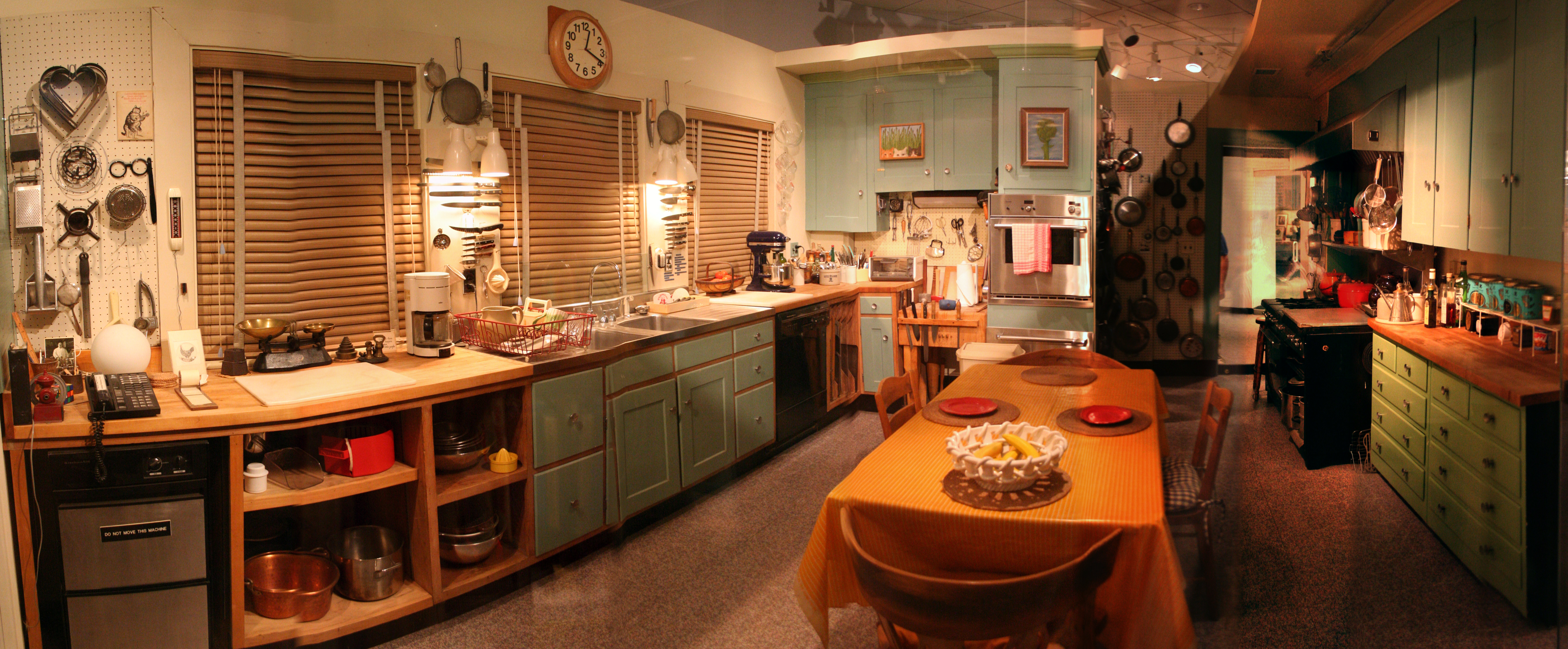
Julia Child's kitchen at the Smithsonian National Museum of American History

In the 1970s and 1980s, she was the star of numerous television programs, including Julia Child & Company, Julia Child & More Company, and Dinner at Julia's. For the 1979 book Julia Child and More Company, she won a National Book Award in category Current Interest. In 1980, Child started appearing regularly on ABC's Good Morning America.

In 1981, she founded the American Institute of Wine & Food, with vintners Robert Mondavi and Richard Graff, and others, to "advance the understanding, appreciation and quality of wine and food," a pursuit she had already begun with her books and television appearances. In 1989, she published what she considered her magnum opus, a book and instructional video series collectively entitled The Way To Cook.

During the AIDS crisis of the 1980s, Child went from holding homophobic views to being a passionate AIDS activist, triggered by a close associate succumbing to AIDS.

In the mid-1990s, as part of her work with the American Institute of Wine and Food, Child became increasingly concerned about children's food education.

She starred in four more series in the 1990s that featured guest chefs: Cooking with Master Chefs, In Julia's Kitchen with Master Chefs, Baking with Julia, and Julia & Jacques Cooking at Home. She collaborated with Jacques Pépin many times for television programs and cookbooks. All of Child's books during this time stemmed from the television series of the same names.

Child's use of ingredients like butter and cream has been questioned by food critics and modern-day nutritionists. She addressed these criticisms throughout her career, predicting that a "fanatical fear of food" would take over the country's dining habits, and that focusing too much on nutrition takes the pleasure from enjoying food. In a 1990 interview, Child said, "Everybody is overreacting. If fear of food continues, it will be the death of gastronomy in the United States. Fortunately, the French don't suffer from the same hysteria we do. We should enjoy food and have fun. It is one of the simplest and nicest pleasures in life."

Julia Child's kitchen, designed by her husband, was the setting for three of her television shows. It is now on display at the National Museum of American History in Washington, D.C. Beginning with In Julia's Kitchen with Master Chefs, the Childs' home kitchen in Cambridge was fully transformed into a functional set, with TV-quality lighting, three cameras positioned to catch all angles in the room, and a massive center island with a gas stovetop on one side and an electric stovetop on the other, but leaving the rest of the Childs' appliances alone, including "my wall oven with its squeaking door." This kitchen backdrop hosted nearly all of Child's 1990s television series.

== Later years ==
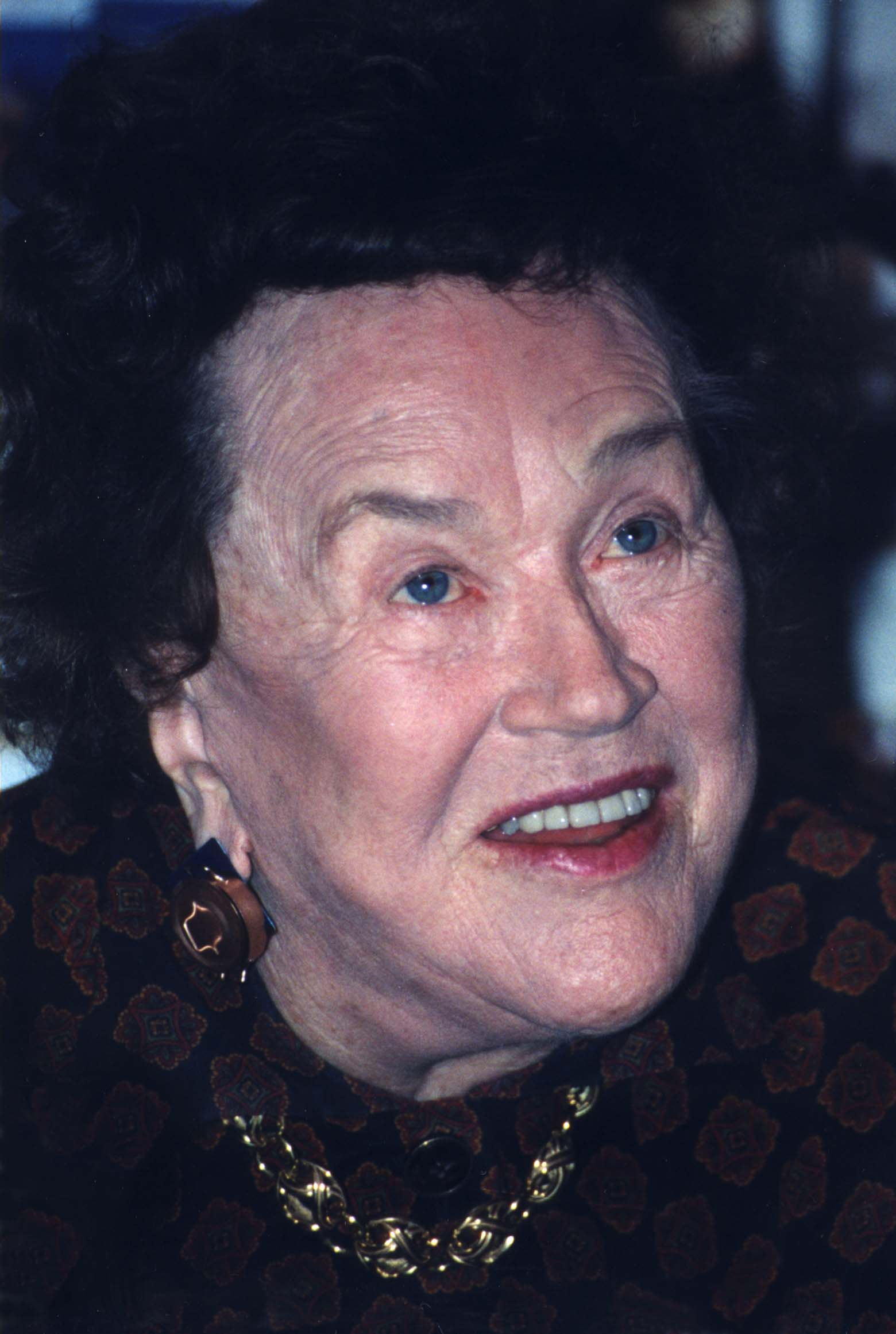
Child in 1994

After her friend Simone Beck died in 1991 at the age of 87, Child relinquished La Pitchoune after a month-long stay in June 1992 with her family, her niece, Phila, and close friend and biographer Noël Riley Fitch. She turned the keys over to Jean Fischbacher's sister, just as she and Paul had promised nearly 30 years earlier. That year, Child spent five days in Sicily at the invitation of Regaleali Winery. American journalist Bob Spitz spent a brief time with Child during that period while he was researching and writing his work then titled History of Eating and Cooking in America. In 1993, Child voiced Dr. Juliet Bleeb in the animated film, We're Back! A Dinosaur's Story.

Spitz took notes and made many recordings of his conversations with Child, and these later formed the basis of a secondary biography of Child, published August 7, 2012 (Knopf), five days before the centennial of her birth. Paul Child, who was 10 years older than his wife, died in 1994 after living in a nursing home for five years following a series of strokes.

In 2001, Child moved to a retirement community in California, donating her house and office to Smith College, which later sold the house.

She donated her kitchen, which her husband had designed with high counters to accommodate her height, and which served as the set for three of her television series, to the Smithsonian's National Museum of American History, where it is now on display. Her copper pots and pans were on display at Copia in Napa, California, until August 2009 when they were reunited with her kitchen at the National Museum of American History in Washington, D.C.

== Death ==
Child died of kidney failure in Montecito, California, on August 13, 2004. She ended her last book, My Life in France, with "... thinking back on it now reminds that the pleasures of the table, and of life, are infinite — toujours bon appétit!"

== Legacy ==
=== The Julia Child Foundation ===
In 1995, Child established The Julia Child Foundation for Gastronomy and Culinary Arts, a private charitable foundation to make grants to further her life's work. The Foundation, originally set up in Massachusetts, later moved to Santa Barbara, California, where it is now headquartered. Inactive until after Julia's death in 2004, the Foundation makes grants to other nonprofits. The grants support primarily gastronomy, the culinary arts, and the further development of the professional food world, all matters of paramount importance to Julia Child during her lifetime. The Foundation's website provides a dedicated page listing the names of grant recipients with a description of the organization and the grant provided by the Foundation. One of the grant recipients is Heritage Radio Network which covers the world of food, drink, and agriculture.

Beyond making grants, the Foundation was also established to protect Child's legacy and intellectual property rights. Many of these rights are jointly held with other organizations like her publishers and the Schlesinger Library at The Radcliffe Institute at Harvard University. The Foundation has been active in protecting these posthumous rights. Child was opposed to endorsements, and the Foundation follows a similar policy regarding the use of her name and image for commercial purposes.

=== Tributes and homages ===
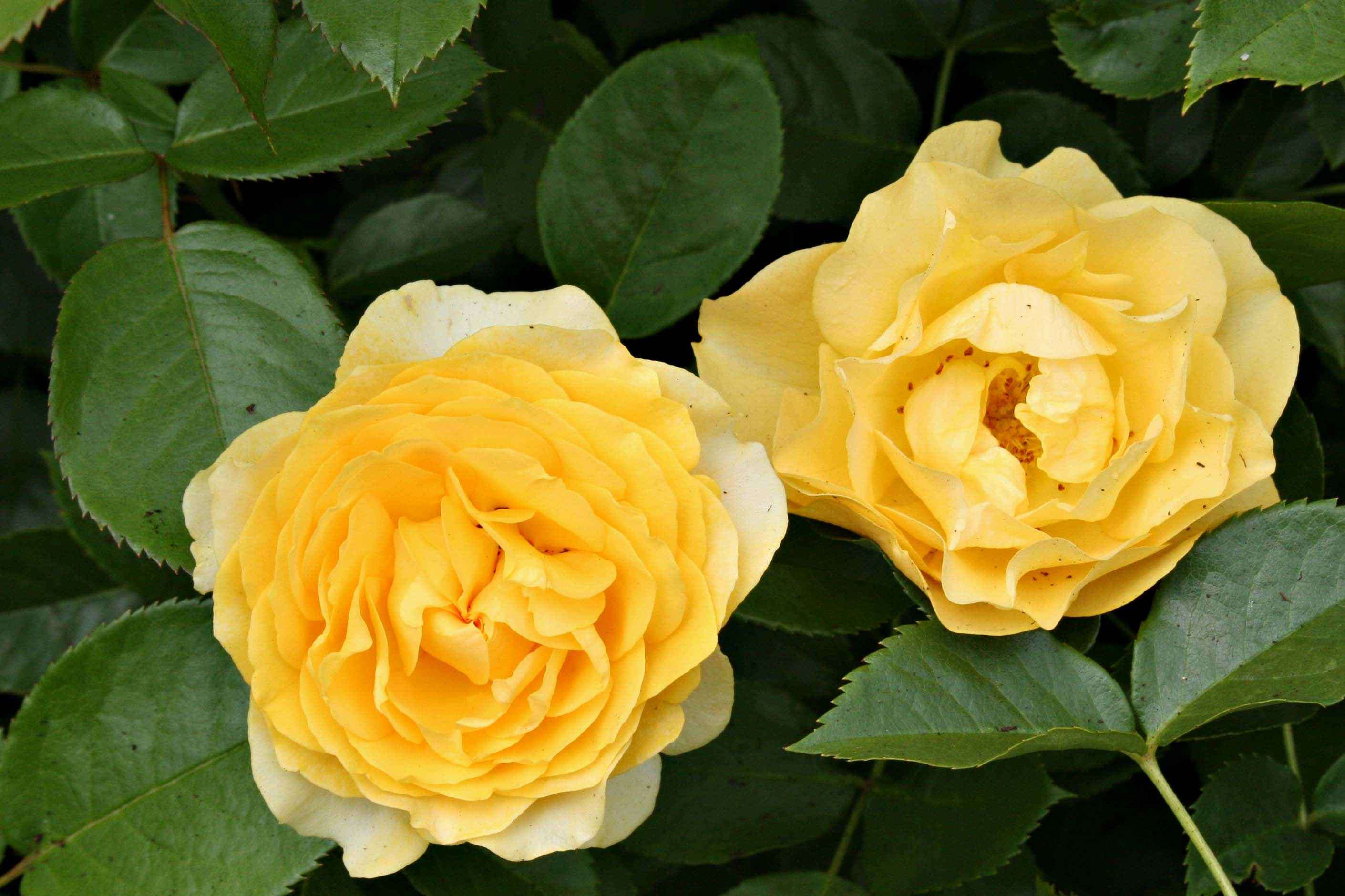
The Julia Child Rose cultivar is known for its yellow blooms.

The Julia Child rose, known in the UK as the "Absolutely Fabulous" rose, is a golden butter/gold floribunda rose named after Child.

The exhibits in the West Wing (1 West) of the National Museum of American History address science and innovation. They include Bon Appétit! Julia Child's Kitchen.

On September 26, 2014, the U.S. Postal Service issued 20 million copies of the "Celebrity Chefs Forever" stamp series, which featured portraits by Jason Seiler of five American chefs: Child, Joyce Chen, James Beard, Edna Lewis, and Felipe Rojas-Lombardi.

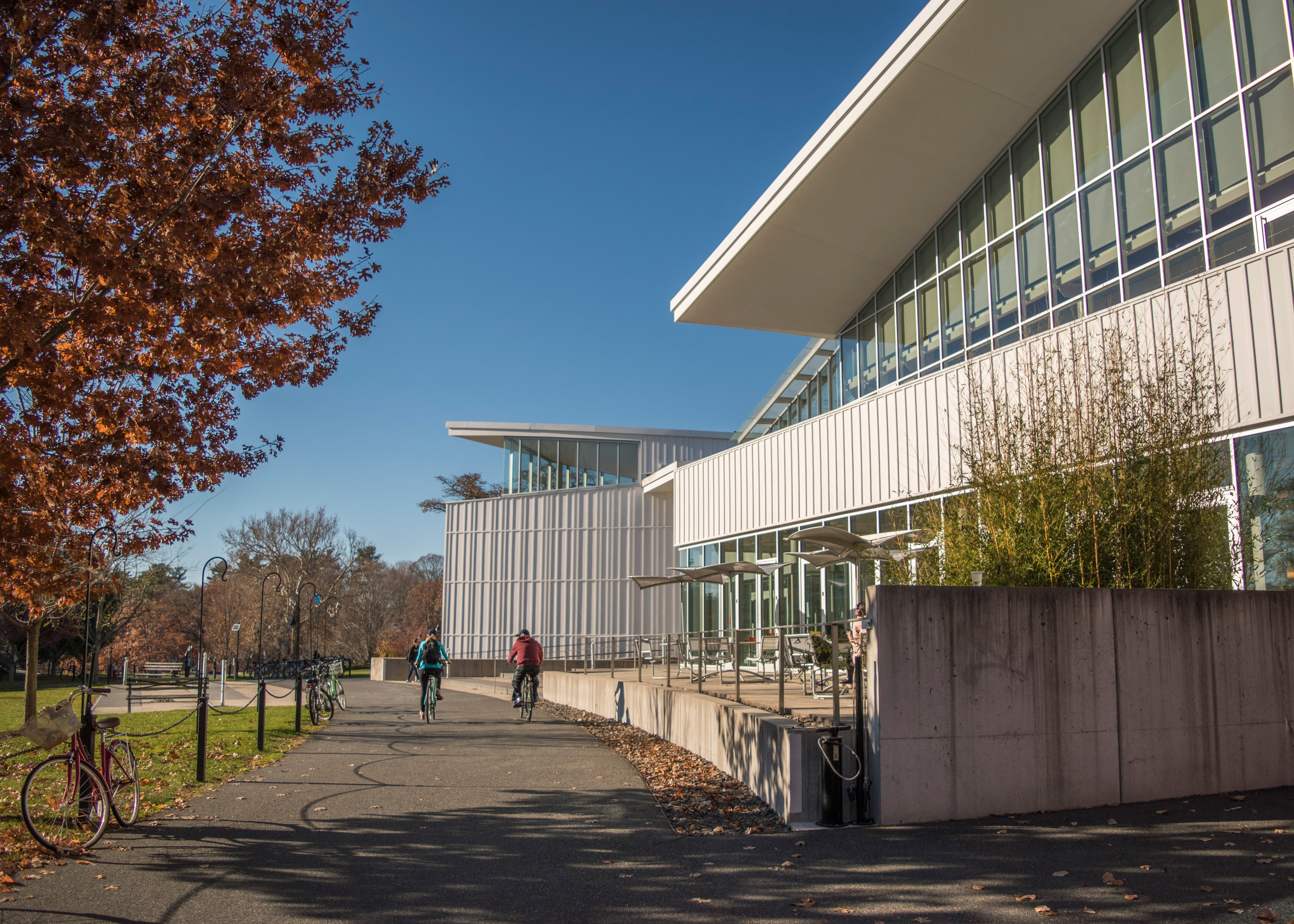
The Julia McWilliams Child '34 Campus Center at Smith College

Smith College used the proceeds from the sale of Child's house in Cambridge to partially fund an architecturally dramatic campus center that opened in 2003. On November 17, 2022, it honored her by naming it the Julia McWilliams Child '34 Campus Center.

== Awards and nominations ==
On November 19, 2000, Child was made a Knight of France's Legion of Honour. She was elected a Fellow of the American Academy of Arts and Sciences in 2000. She was awarded the U.S. Presidential Medal of Freedom in 2003. She received honorary doctorates from Harvard University, Johnson & Wales University (1995), Smith College (her alma mater), Brown University (2000), and several others. In 2007, Child was inducted into the National Women's Hall of Fame.

=== Awards ===
- 1965: Peabody Award for Personal Award for The French Chef
- 1966: Emmy for Achievements in Educational Television- Individuals for The French Chef
- 1980: U.S. National Book Awards for Current Interest (hardcover) for Julia Child and More Company
- 1996: Daytime Emmy Award for Outstanding Service Show Host for In Julia's Kitchen with Master Chefs
- 2001: Daytime Emmy Award for Outstanding Service Show Host for Julia & Jacques Cooking at Home

=== Nominations ===
- 1972: Emmy for Special Classification of Outstanding Program and Individual Achievement – General Programming for The French Chef
- 1994: Emmy for Outstanding Informational Series for Cooking with Master Chefs
- 1997: Daytime Emmy Award for Outstanding Service Show Host for Baking with Julia
- 1999: Daytime Emmy Award for Outstanding Service Show Host for Baking with Julia
- 2000: Daytime Emmy Award for Outstanding Service Show Host for Julia & Jacques Cooking at Home

== In popular culture ==
Child was a favorite of audiences from the moment of her television debut on public television in 1963, and she was a familiar part of American culture and the subject of numerous references, including numerous parodies in television and radio programs and skits. Her great success on air may have been tied to her refreshingly pragmatic approach to the genre, "I think you have to decide who your audience is. If you don't pick your audience, you're lost because you're not really talking to anybody. My audience is people who like to cook, who want to really learn how to do it."

In 1996, Child was ranked No. 46 on TV Guide's 50 Greatest TV Stars of All Time.

=== On stage ===
- Jean Stapleton portrayed Child in a 1989 one-woman short musical play, Bon Appétit!, based on one of Child's televised cooking lessons, with music by American opera composer Lee Hoiby. The title derived from her famous TV sign-off "Bon appétit!"

=== In film ===
- A film titled Primordial Soup With Julia Child was on display at the Smithsonian National Air and Space Museum's Life in the Universe gallery from 1976 until the gallery closed.
- Produced by WGBH, a one-hour feature documentary, Julia Child! America's Favorite Chef, was aired as the first episode of the 18th season of the PBS series American Masters (2004). The film combined archival material of Child with current footage from those who influenced and were influenced by her life and work.
- Julie & Julia (2009) is a film adapted by Nora Ephron from Child's memoir My Life in France and from Julie Powell's memoir about cooking all the recipes in Mastering the Art of French Cooking in one year. Meryl Streep played Child. Streep won a Golden Globe Award for Best Actress in a Leading Role in a Musical or Comedy.
- Keep On Cooking – Julia Child Remixed (2012): A video produced for PBS by musician and filmmaker John D. Boswell as part of the PBS Icons Remixed series in commemoration of Child's 100th birthday. Child's voice is auto-tuned to a melody derived from vocal samples, with synchronized video clips from Child's various television series.
- Julia (2021) is a documentary, which chronicles Child's life. It was directed and produced by Julie Cohen and Betsy West.

=== On television ===
- Child was the inspiration for Judy Graubart's character "Julia Grownup," hostess of the parody cooking show Here's Cooking At You, on the Children's Television Workshop program, The Electric Company, during its transmissions from 1971 to 1977.
- In 1978, Child and Jacques Pépin were guests on the NBC talk show Tomorrow with Tom Snyder. The program was to include a segment with the two chefs preparing food. Before taping the show, Child borrowed Pépin's knife to cut something and accidentally sliced her finger. Tom Snyder was horrified that Child had injured herself, but Child insisted on continuing the program with her bandaged finger. Child told Snyder that, during the taping, Pépin would do the cooking, and Child would taste the dishes. Although Child did not want the television audience to know about her injury, during the taping, Snyder asked Child about her cut finger. After the show, Pépin and Child went to the hospital, where Child received sutures on her sliced finger. Afterwards, Child and Pépin dined at L'Ermitage. Saturday Night Live writers saw the Tomorrow episode with Child and thought it would make a funny sketch. The writers took Child's relatively minor mishap and transformed it into a major accident. Child is parodied by Dan Aykroyd, who is a fan of Julia Child. In the sketch, Aykroyd—as Julia Child—continued with a cooking show despite ludicrously profuse bleeding from a cut to his thumb, and eventually expired while advising, "Save the liver." Child had a videocassette copy of the episode, and she reportedly loved this sketch so much she showed it to friends at parties.
- She appears in an episode of This Old House as designer of the kitchen. This Old House was launched in 1979 by Russell Morash, who helped create The French Chef with Julia Child.
- On March 14, 2022, the Food Network began a new series called The Julia Child Challenge. The series is based in a replica of Julia's kitchen modified to allow eight contestants (all home cooks) to compete at the same time in a multi-episode cooking challenge. Each episode revolves around one or more episode of one of Child's cooking shows with clips of Child interspersed into the contents of the competition. The winner will receive a scholarship to a cooking school in Paris.
- In late March 2022, HBO Max began airing Julia, a television series based on Child's life starring Sarah Lancashire in the title role.

=== In literature ===
- Starting in 2023, author Colleen Gleason worked under the pen name "Colleen Cambridge" to write the American in Paris Mysteries series of historical cozy mystery novels. A fictionalized Julia Child in her early culinary years is a leading protagonist and close friend of the leading sleuth, Tabitha Knight.

=== Online ===
- In 2002, Child was the inspiration for "The Julie/Julia Project", a popular cooking blog by Julie Powell that was the basis of Powell's bestselling book, Julie and Julia: 365 Days, 524 Recipes, 1 Tiny Apartment Kitchen, published in 2005, the year following Child's death. The paperback version of the book was retitled Julie and Julia: My Year of Cooking Dangerously. The blog and book, along with Child's own memoir My Life in France, in turn inspired the 2009 feature film Julie & Julia. Child is reported to have been unimpressed by Powell's blog, believing Powell's determination to cook every recipe in Mastering the Art of French Cooking in a year to be a stunt. In an interview, Child's editor, Judith Jones, said of Powell's blog: "Flinging around four-letter words when cooking isn't attractive, to me or Julia. She didn't want to endorse it. What came through on the blog was somebody who was doing it almost for the sake of a stunt."
- On March 15, 2016, Twitch started to stream Child's show The French Chef. This event was in celebration of both the launch of the cooking section of Twitch and the anniversary of Child's graduation from Le Cordon Bleu.
- In May 2016, Epic Rap Battles of History made an episode featuring Julia Child, portrayed by Mamrie Hart, battling against Gordon Ramsay (portrayed by ERB co-creator EpicLLOYD), garnering over 51 million views as of 2026.

== Works ==
=== Television series ===
- The French Chef (1963–1966; 1970–1973)
- Julia Child & Company (1978–1979)
- Julia Child & More Company (1979–1980)
- Dinner at Julia's (1983–1984)
- The Way To Cook (1985) six one-hour videocassettes
- A Birthday Party for Julia Child: Compliments to the Chef (1992)
- Cooking with Master Chefs: Hosted by Julia Child (1993–1994) 16 episodes
- Cooking In Concert: Julia Child & Jacques Pépin (1994)
- In Julia's Kitchen with Master Chefs (1995), 39 episodes
- Cooking In Concert: Julia Child & Graham Kerr (1995)
- More Cooking in Concert: Julia Child & Jacques Pépin (1996)
- Baking with Julia (1996–1997) 39 episodes
- Julia & Jacques Cooking at Home (1999–2000) 22 episodes
- Julia Child's Kitchen Wisdom, (2000) two-hour special

=== DVD releases ===
- Julia Child's Kitchen Wisdom (2000)
- Julia and Jacques: Cooking at Home (2003)
- Julia Child: America's Favorite Chef (2004)
- The French Chef: Volume One (2005)
- The French Chef: Volume Two (2005)
- Julia Child! The French Chef (2006)
- The Way To Cook (2009)
- Baking With Julia (2009)

=== Software ===
- Julia Child: Home Cooking With Master Chefs (1995)

=== Books ===
- Mastering the Art of French Cooking (1961), with Simone Beck and Louisette Bertholle
- The French Chef Cookbook (1968). ISBN 0-394-40135-2.
- Mastering the Art of French Cooking, Volume Two (1970), with Simone Beck. ISBN 0-394-40152-2.
- From Julia Child's Kitchen (1975). ISBN 0-517-20712-5.
- Julia Child & Company (1978). ISBN 0-345-31449-2.
- Julia Child & More Company (1979). ISBN 0-345-31450-6.
- The Way to Cook (1989). ISBN 0-394-53264-3.
- Julia Child's Menu Cookbook (1991), one-volume edition of Julia Child & Company and Julia Child & More Company. ISBN 0-517-06485-5.
- Cooking With Master Chefs (1993). ISBN 0-679-74829-6.
- In Julia's Kitchen with Master Chefs (1995). ISBN 0-679-43896-3.
- Baking with Julia (1996). ISBN 0-688-14657-0.
- Julia's Delicious Little Dinners (1998). ISBN 0-375-40336-1.
- Julia's Menus for Special Occasions (1998). ISBN 0-375-40338-8.
- Julia's Breakfasts, Lunches & Suppers (1999). ISBN 0-375-40339-6.
- Julia's Casual Dinners (1999). ISBN 0-375-40337-X.
- Julia and Jacques Cooking at Home (1999), with Jacques Pépin. ISBN 978-0-375-40431-3.
- Julia's Kitchen Wisdom (2000). ISBN 0-375-41151-8.
- My Life in France (2006, posthumous), with Alex Prud'homme. ISBN 1-4000-4346-8.
- (collected in) American Food Writing: An Anthology with Classic Recipes, ed. Molly O'Neill (Library of America, 2007)

== Books about Child ==
- Barr, Nancy Verde (March 28, 2008). Backstage with Julia: My Years with Julia Child. John Wiley and Sons. ISBN 978-0-470-27637-2.
- Conant, Jennet (April 5, 2011). A Covert Affair: Julia Child and Paul Child in the OSS. Simon and Schuster. ISBN 978-1-4391-6352-8.
- Fitch, Noël Riley (April 13, 1999). Appetite for Life: The Biography of Julia Child. Random House Digital, Inc. ISBN 978-0-385-49383-3.
- Painter, Charlotte; Valois, Pamela (1985). Gifts of age: portraits and essays of 32 remarkable women. Chronicle Books. ISBN 978-0-87701-368-6.
- Reardon, Joan (December 1, 2010). As Always, Julia: The Letters of Julia Child and Avis DeVoto. Houghton Mifflin Harcourt. ISBN 978-0-547-41771-4.
- Shapiro, Laura (August 1, 2009). Julia Child: A Life. Penguin. ISBN 978-0-14-311644-8.
- Spitz, Bob (August 7, 2012). Dearie: The Remarkable Life of Julia Child (end notes available on author's site). Alfred A. Knopf. ISBN 978-0-307-47341-7.

== See also ==
- Doña Petrona
- Fanny Cradock
- Graham Kerr (The Galloping Gourmet)
- List of Legion of Honour recipients by name
