= Julia & Jacques Cooking at Home =

1999 American cooking television show

Julia & Jacques Cooking at Home was a television cooking show starring Julia Child and Jacques Pepin which originally aired on PBS in 1999 and 2000.

The program won the 2001 Daytime Emmy for “Outstanding Service Show Host”.
