= Paul Cushing Child =

American diplomat (1902–1994)

- Born: January 15, 1902; Montclair, New Jersey, U.S.
- Died: May 12, 1994 (aged 92); Lexington, Massachusetts, U.S.
- Education: Boston Latin School; Columbia University
- Occupations: Civil servant; diplomat
- Spouse: Julia McWilliams (m. 1946)

Paul Cushing Child (January 15, 1902 – May 12, 1994) was an American civil servant, diplomat, and artist known for being the husband of celebrity chef and author Julia Child.

== Early life ==
Child was born in Montclair, New Jersey, on January 15, 1902, to Bertha Cushing and Charles Tripler Child. When he and his twin brother Charlie were six months old, their father died and their mother relocated them with her to her family's home in Boston. It was there that Child attended Boston Latin School.

After taking an extension course at Columbia University he then became a teacher in France, Italy, and the United States, instructing students in various subjects including photography, English, and French. In 1941, while at Avon Old Farms School, he was a teacher and mentor to future poet John Gillespie Magee Jr. Child was a fourth degree black belt in judo as well as a judo instructor.

== Government service and marriage ==
During World War II, Child joined the Office of Strategic Services (OSS). While stationed in Kandy, Ceylon (now Sri Lanka), he met Julia McWilliams, the head of the Registry of the OSS Secretariat. They married on September 1, 1946, in Lumberville, Pennsylvania, and later moved to Washington, D.C. A lover of world cuisine, Child was known for his sophisticated palate.

After he finished his work with the OSS, Child joined the United States Foreign Service. In 1948, the U.S. State Department assigned Child to be an exhibits officer with the United States Information Agency. While he worked at US Embassy in Paris, France, Julia studied at the famed Paris cooking school Le Cordon Bleu.

After five years in Paris, Child was reassigned to US Consulate in Marseille, US Embassy in Bonn, and US Embassy in Oslo. In April 1955, he was summoned from Bonn to undergo interrogation in Washington, D.C. While there, he was questioned about his political beliefs and the political beliefs of his co-workers.

Specifically, he was questioned about Jane Foster, a friend of the Childs' during World War II. He was also accused of "homosexual tendencies" and told by agents that "male homosexuals often have wives and children". Feeling his privacy had been violated through the interrogation, Child's and his wife's opposition to the Senate investigations—spearheaded at that time by Senator Joseph McCarthy—was reinforced.

Child retired from US Government civil service in 1961.

== Later years ==
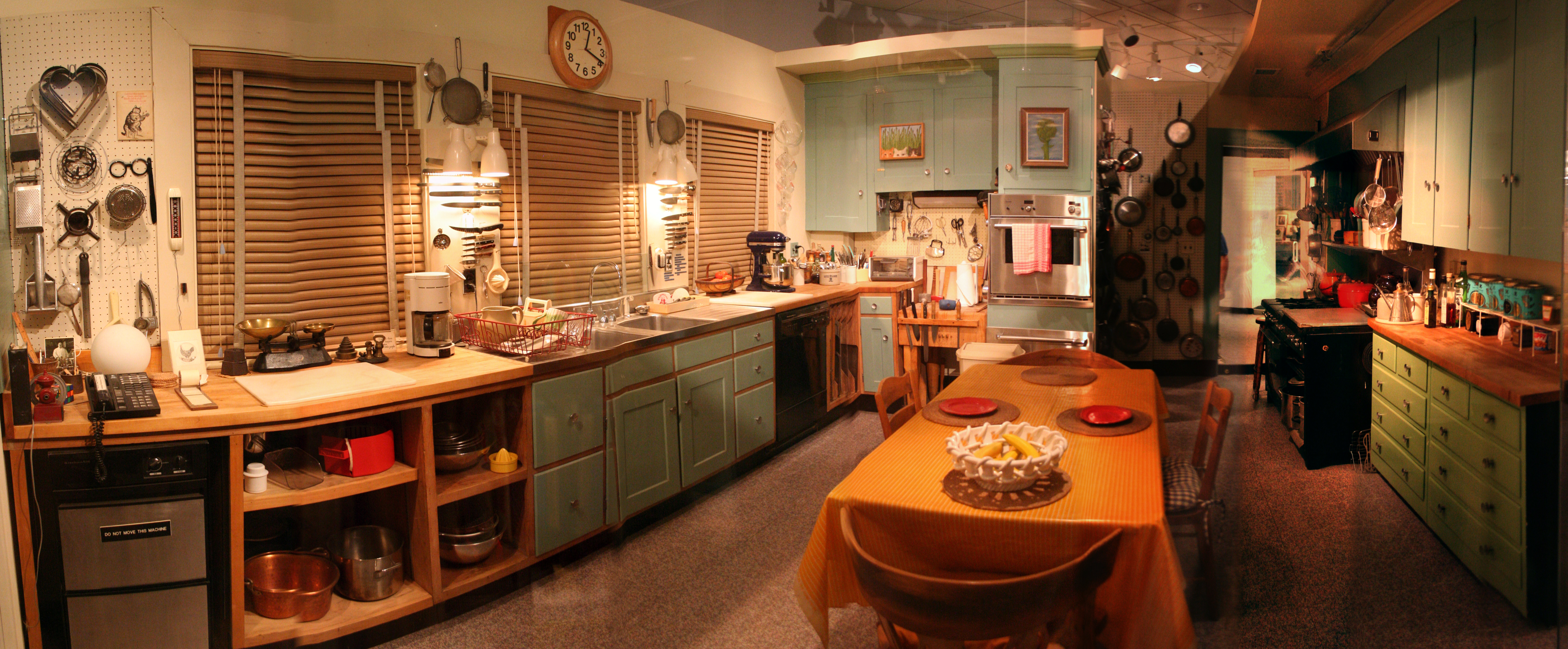
Julia Child's kitchen at the Smithsonian National Museum of American History

Following his retirement, the Childs moved to Cambridge, Massachusetts, where his wife wrote cookbooks, and he took photographs to provide illustrations for them. Child was also known as a poet who frequently wrote about his wife; his prose was later celebrated in an authorized biography of her. In Appetite for Life, portions of the letters he wrote to his twin brother while the Childs lived abroad were included as an illustration of his love and admiration for his wife as well as her cooking skills and talent.

Julia Child's kitchen, designed by Paul Child, was the setting for three of her television shows. It is now on display at the National Museum of American History in Washington, D.C. Beginning with In Julia's Kitchen with Master Chefs, the Childs' home kitchen in Cambridge was fully transformed into a functional set, with TV-quality lighting, three cameras positioned to catch all angles in the room, and a massive center island with a gas stovetop on one side and an electric stovetop on the other, but leaving the rest of the Childs' appliances alone.

Portrait by Child of his wife Julia

Barbara Hansen, for the Los Angeles Times in 1989, highlighted an exhibition of Child's photographs and paintings at the Southern California Culinary Guild and commented that "although he has had some small exhibits, Child has received scant personal recognition. Mostly, he has remained in his wife’s shadow". Hansen highlighted a 1954 photograph as "the most arresting, perhaps," in the exhibit; the photograph features "a sensitive study of Julia in a cowl-necked blue dress holding an amber cat".

During coronary bypass surgery in 1974, a lack of oxygen to his brain resulted in mild damage that affected him for the rest of his life, though he was able to return to photography and other hobbies; Julia Child moved him to a nursing home in 1989 after an incident in which he wandered away from home and was lost on the streets of Cambridge. Paul died at the nursing home in Lexington, Massachusetts, on May 12, 1994. Julia died ten years later, on August 13, 2004. A collection of papers held at the Schlesinger Library includes a selection of both Paul and Julia Child's journals, notes, personal and professional correspondence, along with a selection of Paul Child's artwork (photographs, prose and poetry).

== Posthumous publications ==
- 2017 France Is a Feast: The Photographic Journey of Paul and Julia Child. Written by Alex Prud’homme, great-nephew of Paul Child, and Katie Pratt; features 225 photographs by Child.

== In popular culture ==
- Child is portrayed by Stanley Tucci in the 2009 comedy-drama film Julie & Julia, which is adapted in part from Julia Child's memoir My Life in France; the film includes Child's interrogation in 1955.
- He is portrayed by David Hyde Pierce in the 2022 television series Julia.

== Additional sources ==
- Conant, Jennet, A Covert Affair: Julia and Paul Child in the OSS (New York: Simon & Schuster, 2011), ISBN 1-4391-6352-9
