= Bourguignon =

Bourguignon can refer to:

- Bourguignon (surname)
- Burgundian language (Oïl), an Oïl language spoken in the region of Burgundy
- Bourguignon, Doubs, a commune of the Doubs département of France
- a style of cooking with alcohol, especially Beef bourguignon
- Bourguignon (grape), another name for the French wine grape Gouais blanc
- Bourguignon horse, an extinct horse breed
- Jacques Courtois, a painter who was popularly known as "le Bourguignon"
- Fort Bourguignon, a fortress in Pula, Croatia
- Bourguignons, Aube, a commune in France
