= Cooking with wine =

Cooking technique

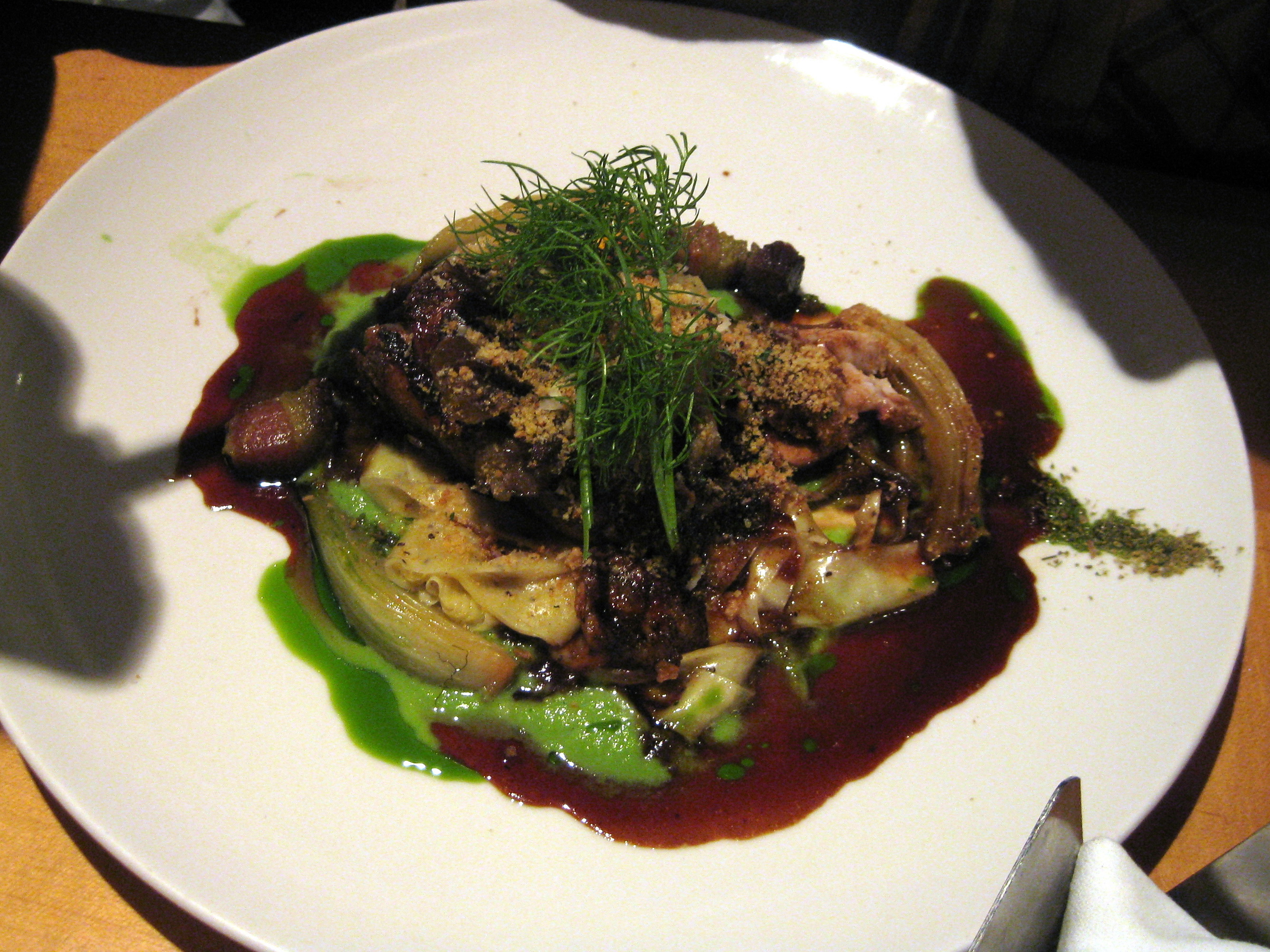
Red wine braised rabbit

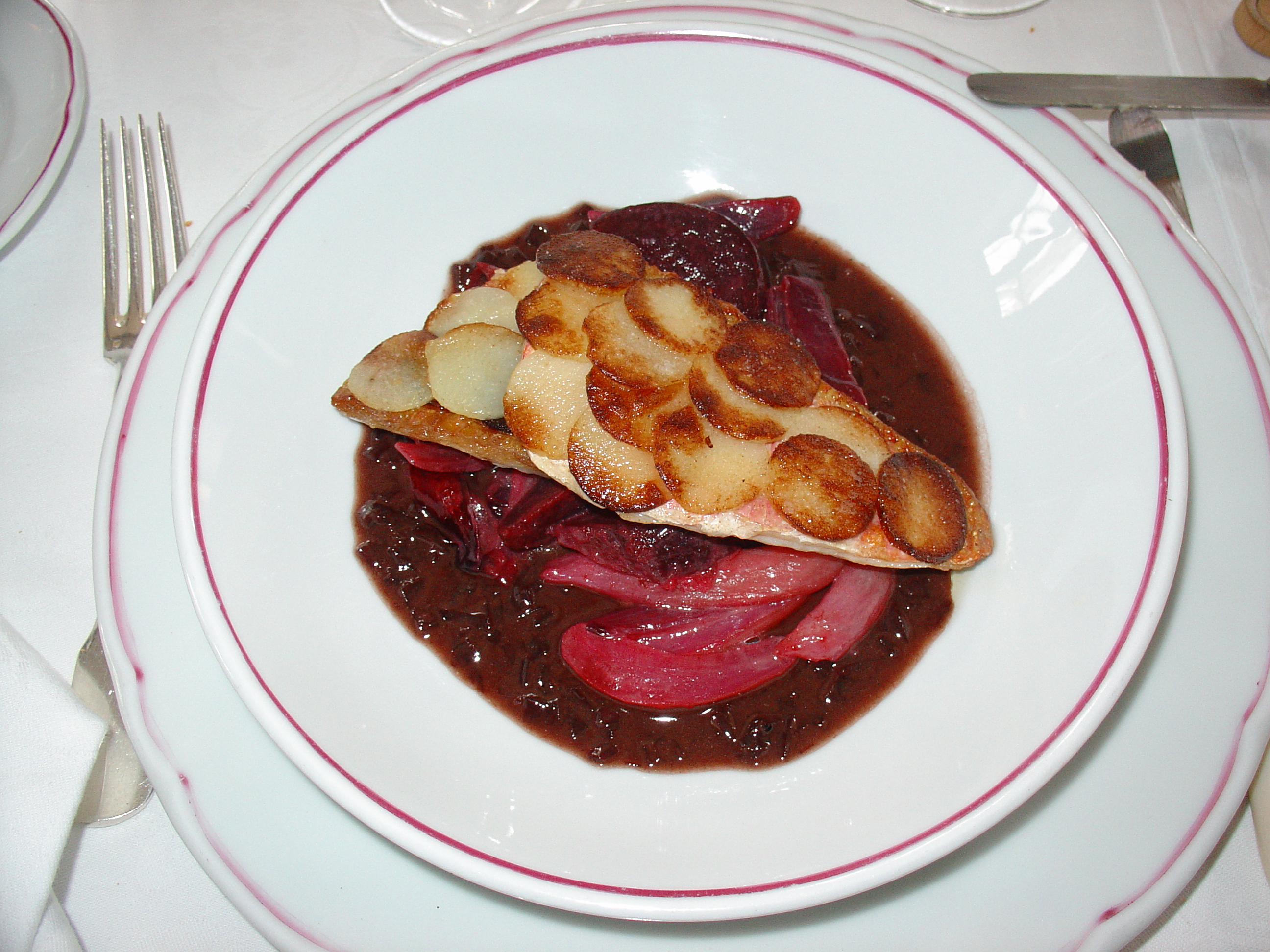
A dish of fish with potato ‘scales’ served with a beurre rouge (red butter)

Cooking with wine is the use of wine as an ingredient in the preparation of cooked food. Wine is used in a wide variety of culinary traditions to contribute flavor, acidity, aroma, moisture, and color to dishes.

== Utility ==
Wine can be used in preparation and tenderizing, as well as a flavor agent in marinades, stocks, stews (e.g. coq au vin, beef bourguignon), and sauces (e.g. in wine sauces). Many desserts also contain wine, such as zabaione and trifle. Ethanol has a boiling point of approximately 78 °C (172 °F), and some of the alcohol evaporates during cooking, while the wine's acidity and sugars become more prominent. The quality of cooking wine is a matter of debate, but flavor compounds in a fine wine may not survive heating.

In Joy of Cooking, it is noted that low-proof alcoholic beverages such as wine, beer, sake, and hard cider are often added before cooking, as part of a marinade, or early in the cooking process, allowing their flavors to become concentrated through simmering. They may also be used as a soaking liquid for cakes and other desserts. Fortified wines, which have a higher alcohol content and more concentrated flavors, are generally added in moderation, sometimes toward the end of cooking. Wine can also be used for deglazing, a cooking technique for removing and dissolving browned food residue from a pan to flavor sauces, soups, and gravies.

Wine contains naturally occurring organic acids, particularly tartaric acid and malic acid, which contribute sourness, and can balance the richness of fatty foods. This acidity is particularly important in sauces, braises, and preparations containing butter, cream, or meat juices.

The effects of wine on the flavor of a dish depend in part on characteristics such as sweetness, acidity, and aroma. As the liquid is reduced, its acidity and sugars become more concentrated. Consequently, recipes using wine may require additional seasoning toward the end of cooking, when the final balance of flavors can be assessed. Wine added to a nearly completed dish may need be reduced separately in a saucepan before being incorporated. Joy of Cooking gives, as an example, one cup of wine reducing to approximately one-quarter cup after ten minutes of brisk, uncovered simmering.

Cooking with wine does not necessarily eliminate all of the alcohol, with research indicating that substantial amounts may remain, particularly where wine is added shortly before serving, or where cooking times are brief.

== Varieties of wine ==
Both red wines and white wines are used in cooking, as are rosé, sparkling wines, and dessert wines. Dry red and white wines are the most commonly used types, although dry rosé wines can also be used, particularly for poaching fruit. Different varieties of wine serve different culinary purposes, with dry red and white table wines commonly being used in savory dishes, while rosé is used for poaching fruit. Sparkling wines, particularly Champagne, can be used uncooked in desserts, where their acidity and effervescence can remain distinctive, while the carbon dioxide responsible for their effervescence is largely lost.

Fortified wines, such as port, sherry, Madeira, and Marsala, are more concentrated than ordinary table wines, and are often used in relatively small amounts. Joy of Cooking notes that vermouth and drier varieties of sherry can also be used as part of the liquid in braised dishes.

In Asian cuisine, rice-based wines and related fermented alcoholic beverages are also used. Sake and mirin are widely used in Japanese cuisine, both in cooking and in marinades. While cooking sake is commercially available, Joy of Cooking advises against varieties labeled as cooking wine, as they often contain additives. The book suggests pale dry sherry or white wine as possible substitutes for sake. Shaoxing wine, a Chinese rice wine, has a slightly oxidized flavor with subtle herbal characteristics, and is an important ingredient in Chinese cuisine. It is used in numerous cooked dishes, including marinades and sauces. Commercial Shaoxing wines labeled for cooking may contain added salt or other ingredients, and can be used as a substitute for dry sherry.

The use of expensive or high-quality wine in cooking is a matter of differing culinary opinions. Joy of Cooking advises that wine used for cooking should be sufficiently good to drink, but need not be old or expensive, stating that "using a fine wine in cooking is a waste, as much of its character will be cooked out". The book also advises against excessively tannic wines, which may impart bitterness or acidity to the finished dish. Commercial products labeled as cooking wine may contain substantial quantities of added salt, making them unsuitable for subtler recipes. Wine that has been open for a day or two, and has lost some freshness but remains drinkable, can be used for cooking, and wine can be stored for future cooking by transferring it to a smaller, tightly closed bottle and refrigerating it, thereby reducing its exposure to oxygen. Boxed wines may also be suitable because their packaging limits exposure to air as the wine is dispensed.

== Common dishes ==
Dry Marsala wine is used in savory cooking. A typical savory Marsala sauce, for example, involves reducing the wine almost to a syrup with onions or shallots, then adding mushrooms and herbs. One of the most popular Marsala recipes is chicken marsala, in which flour-coated pounded chicken breast halves are braised in a mixture of Marsala, butter, olive oil, mushrooms, and spices. Marsala is also used in some risotto recipes. Sweet Marsala wine is used to produce rich Italian desserts such as zabaione, tiramisu and shortcake.

Another particularly noted dish made with wine is Coq au vin, a French dish of chicken braised with wine, lardons, mushrooms, and optionally garlic. A red Burgundy wine is typically used, though many regions of France make variants using local wines, such as coq au vin jaune (Jura), coq au riesling (Alsace), coq au pourpre or coq au violet (Beaujolais nouveau), and coq au Champagne. Although the word coq in French means "rooster" or "cock", and tough birds like mature roosters with much connective tissue benefit from braising, coq au vin may be made with any poultry, most commonly chicken. Standard recipes require red wine (often Burgundy) for braising, lardons, button mushrooms, onions, often garlic, and sometimes brandy. Recipes with vin jaune may specify morels instead of white mushrooms. The preparation is similar in many respects to beef bourguignon. The chicken is seasoned, sometimes floured, seared in fat and slowly simmered in wine until tender. The usual seasonings are salt, pepper, thyme, parsley, and bay leaf, usually in the form of a bouquet garni. The juices are thickened either with a roux or by adding blood at the end.

Beurre blanc is a hot butter sauce. It is traditionally served with pike (brochet au beurre blanc) and is also served with other fish, vegetables and eggs. The authors of Mastering the Art of French Cooking (1961) comment, "Warm, thick, creamy, and butter-coloured, beurre blanc is actually nothing but warm butter flavoured with shallots, wine, vinegar, salt, and pepper". White wine and vinegar or lemon juice are boiled down with very finely chopped shallots until the acids are well concentrated. Butter is gradually beaten in with a whisk, and, because of the acids, the milk solids in the butter remain suspended rather than sinking to the bottom of pan as they would otherwise do when heated. This keeps the sauce from turning oily and it retains a creamy appearance. The small amount of emulsifiers naturally found in butter, including a trace of lecithin, form an oil-in-water emulsion. A variation, Beurre rouge (English: "red butter"), is prepared by substituting a dry red wine for the white wine and vinegar. Madame Prunier, who ran celebrated fish restaurants in Paris and London, recommended beurre rouge to accompany barbel, carp, eel and tench.

Wine is also used in desserts where it is not subjected to prolonged heating. Joy of Cooking notes that Champagne and other sparkling wines are particularly suited to uncooked desserts, where their acidity and effervescence contribute to the finished dish. Examples include sparkling-wine preparations with fruit, and gelatin-based desserts. Another such gelatin-based dessert was wine jelly, which appeared in nineteenth-century American cookbooks. Lafcadio Hearn included a recipe for wine jelly in his 1885 cookbook La Cuisine Creole, calling for wine to be combined with gelatin, sugar, and flavorings. The recipe was not unique to Louisiana Creole cuisine, and wine jellies were also associated with the households of George Washington and Thomas Jefferson, the latter having such a among the small number of culinary recipes he recorded in his own handwriting.

== History ==
Wine was used for cooking in ancient Greek and Roman societies, particularly in sauces and marinades. Several legends specifically trace coq au vin to ancient Gaul and Julius Caesar, but the recipe was not documented until the early 20th century. It is generally accepted that it existed as a rustic dish long before that. A somewhat similar recipe, poulet au vin blanc, appeared in an 1864 cookbook.

The use of wine in cooking is also affected by religious dietary restrictions. In halal culinary traditions observing Islamic prohibitions on alcohol, cooks may substitute combinations of fruit juices and vinegar for wine in recipes, or avoid dishes that traditionally require wine. Food historian Carol Helstosky notes that chefs in restaurants in Islamic countries have developed such alternatives for dishes otherwise prepared with wine.

== See also ==
- Cooking with alcohol
- Wine and food pairing
