= Cooking with alcohol =

Alcohol as a cooking ingredient

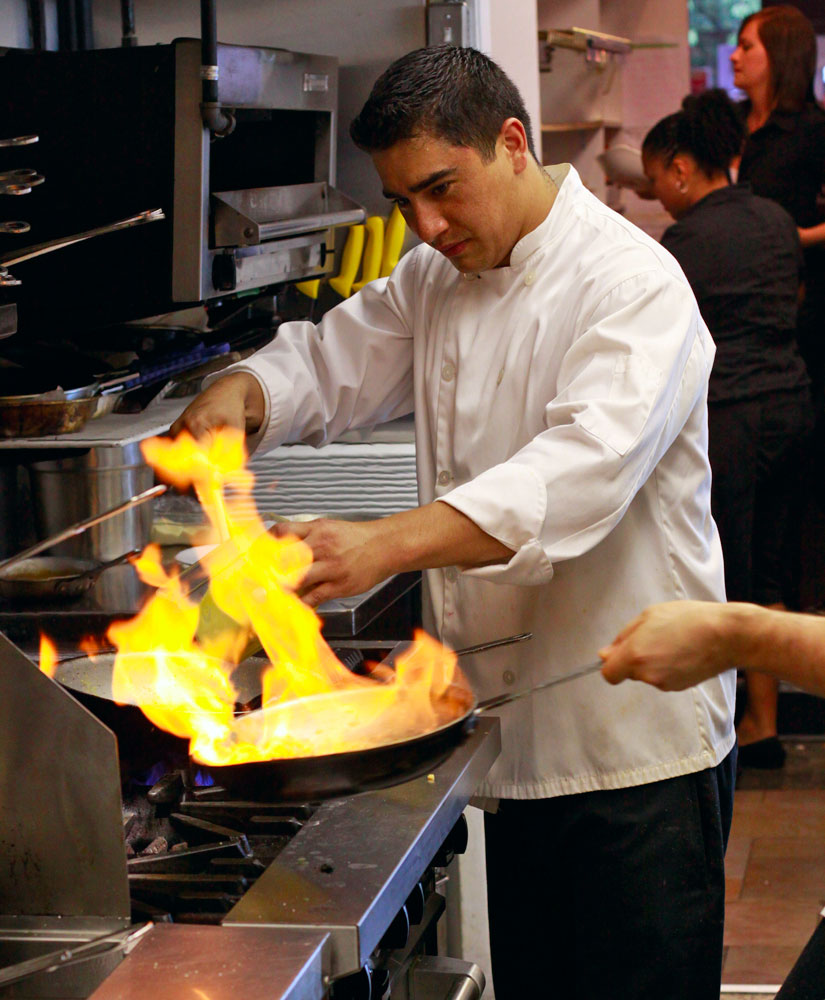
Flambéing in a skillet

Cooking with alcohol means using alcohol in the preparation of food either as an ingredient, a cooking fuel, or for visual display.

Wine is frequently used as an ingredient for its acidic properties, its bitter tannins, and its fruit components. Beer and liqueurs are also commonly used as alcoholic ingredients. For a flambé, in which warm alcohol is ignited, the higher alcohol content of a distilled spirit is required.

== As an ingredient ==
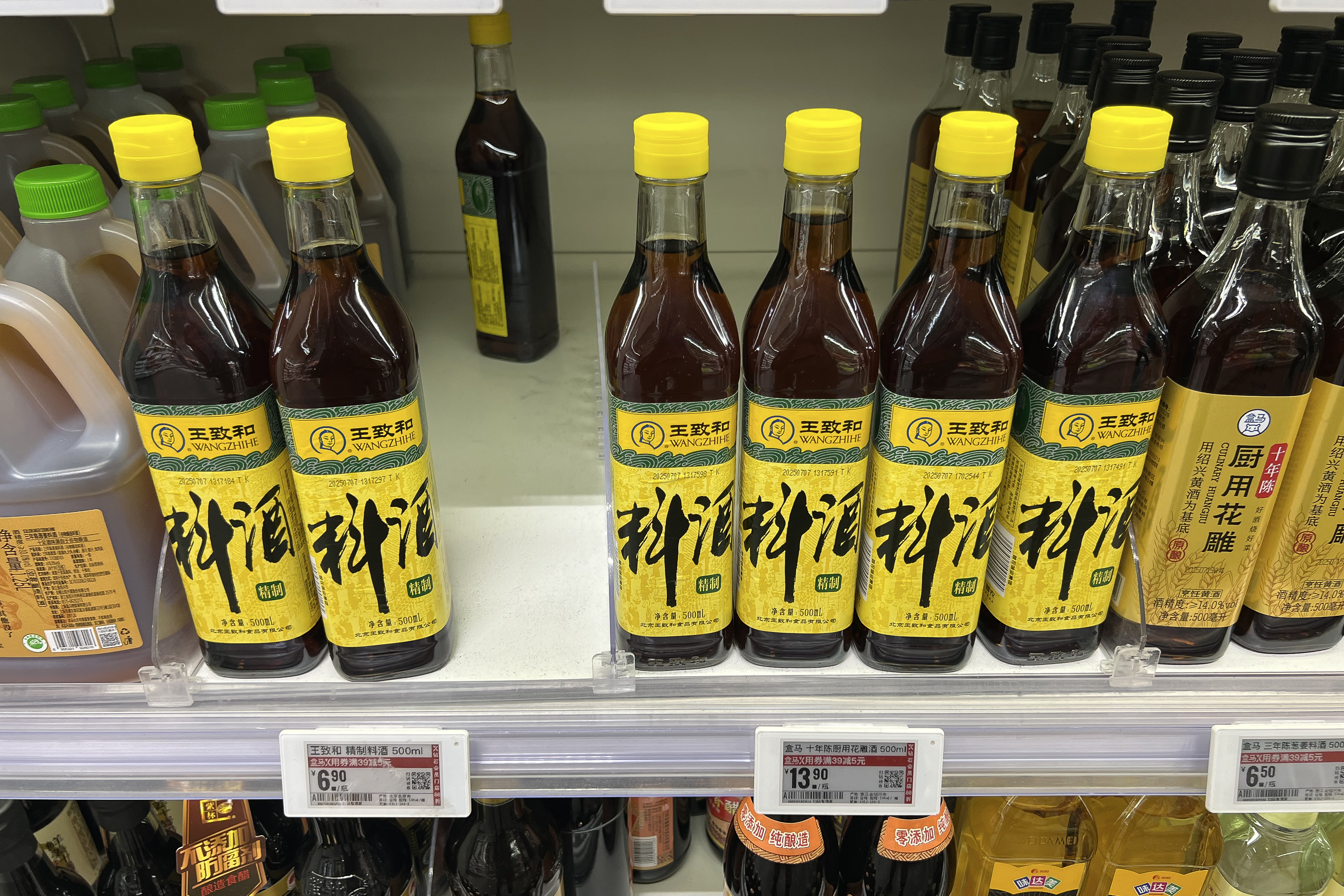
Liaojiu, a class of Huangjiu-based Chinese cooking wine

Many dishes incorporate alcoholic beverages into the food itself. Such dishes include coq au vin, chicken cacciatore, chicken marsala and boeuf bourguignon. More modern examples are beer grilled chicken and bratwursts boiled in beer. Adding beer, instead of water, to chili during cooking is popular. An overnight marinade of chicken, pork or beef in beer and spices is another example.

Specialist cooking wines, liqueurs, vermouths and eaux de vie are widely used by professional chefs to enhance flavour in traditional and modern dishes. These are specially created to be an ingredient in cooking, not a beverage. As well as offering value for money, they have a longer shelf life which avoids wastage. The addition of specialist cooking wines, liqueurs and vermouths adds flavour to finished meat and fish dishes; desserts benefit from the use of sweet or dry wines. In addition, the use of specialist cooking wine in marinades can tenderise meat and is of particular benefit to game dishes.

=== Flambé ===
Flambé is a technique where alcohol, such as brandy, is poured on top of a dish and then ignited to create a visual presentation.

A variation of the flambé tradition is employed in Japanese teppanyaki restaurants where a spirit is poured onto the griddle and then lit, providing both a dramatic start to the cooking, and a residue on the griddle which indicates to the chef which parts of the griddle are hottest.

=== Alcohol in finished food ===
A study by a team of researchers at the University of Idaho, Washington State University, and the US Department of Agriculture's Nutrient Data Laboratory calculated the percentage of alcohol remaining in a dish based on various cooking methods. The results are as follows:

- alcohol added to boiling liquid and removed from heat: 85% alcohol retained
- alcohol flamed: 75% alcohol retained
- no heat, stored overnight: 70% alcohol retained
- baked, 25 minutes, alcohol not stirred into mixture: 45% alcohol retained
- baked/simmered, alcohol stirred into mixture: (see table)

Time (h)	Alcohol retained
0.25	40%
0.5	35%
1.0	25%
1.5	20%
2.0	10%
2.5	5.0%

== Alcohol as cooking fuel ==
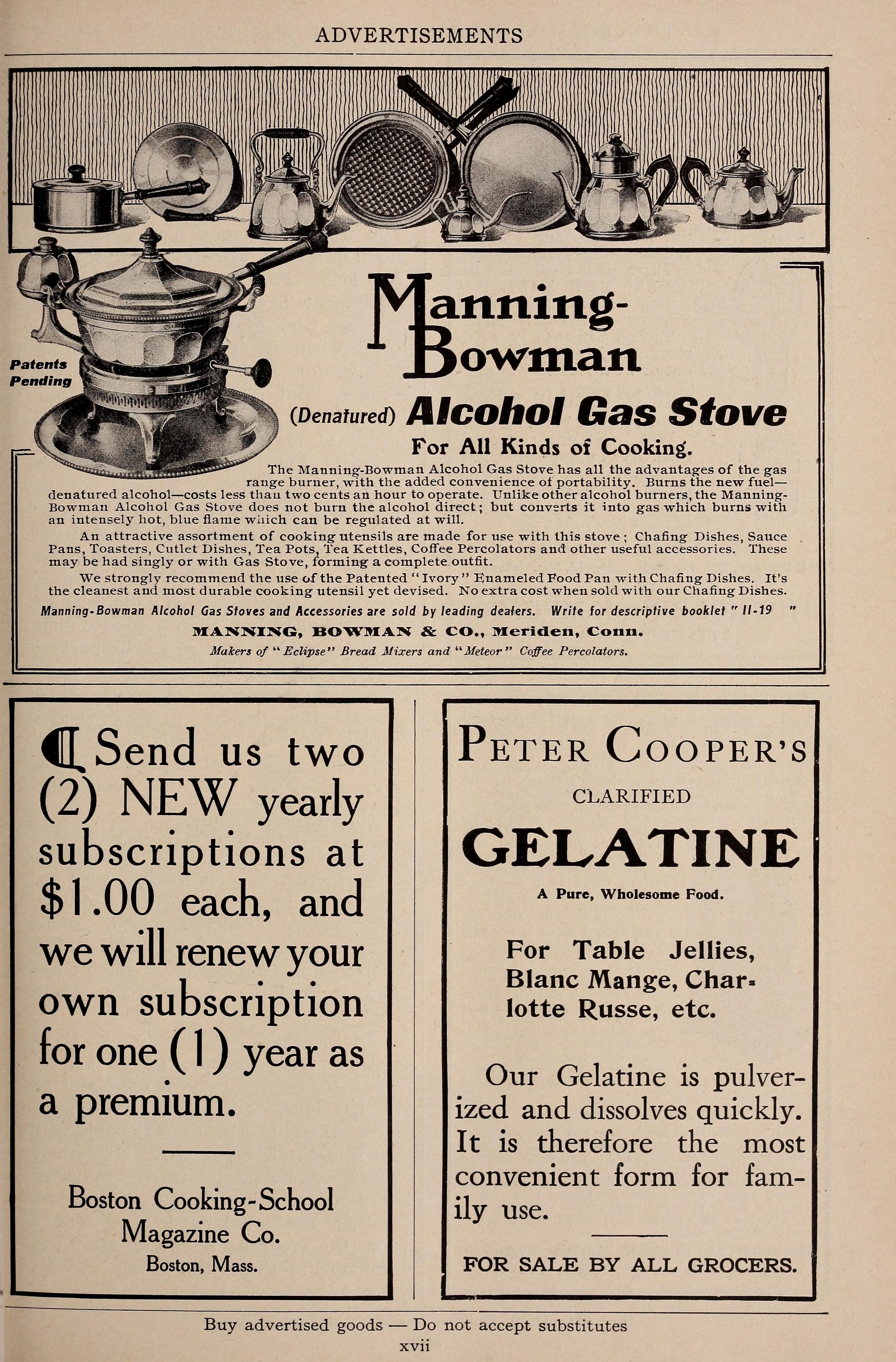
An advertisement for an alcohol gas stove in The Boston Cooking School magazine of culinary science and domestic economics (1908).

Alcohol stoves became popular on boats as an alternative to dangerous kerosene stoves. Although denatured alcohol, such as Sterno, is more expensive than other fuels, and puts out less heat, it is often preferred as a marine stove for safety reasons. Alcohol stoves have also become popular as camp stoves because alcohol is environmentally friendly to burn.

A beverage-can stove is an example of a very lightweight alcohol stove for camping.

== See also ==
- Cooking with wine
- List of cooking techniques
