= Bouquet garni =

Herb mixture used in cooking

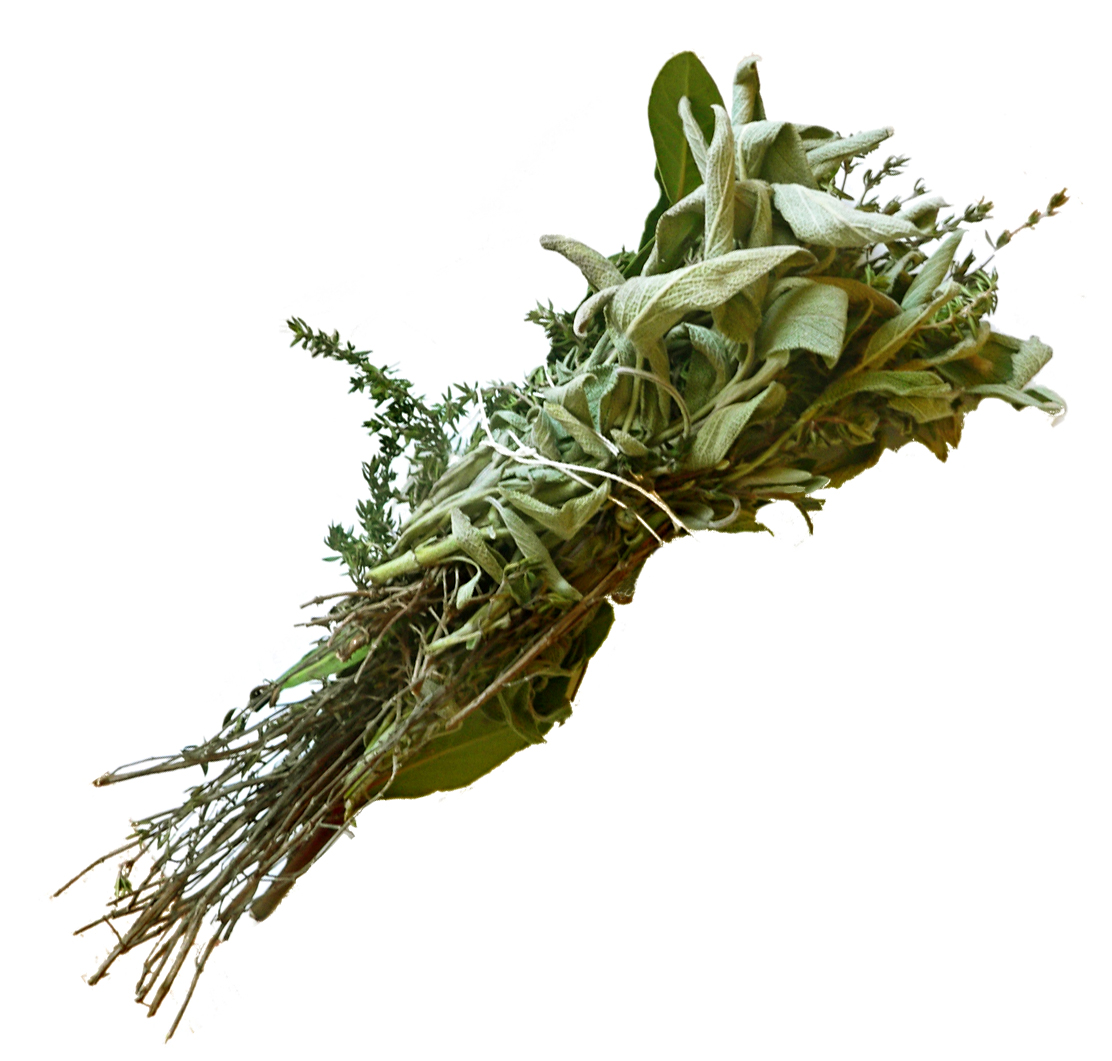
Bouquet garni of thyme, bay leaves, and sage, tied with a string

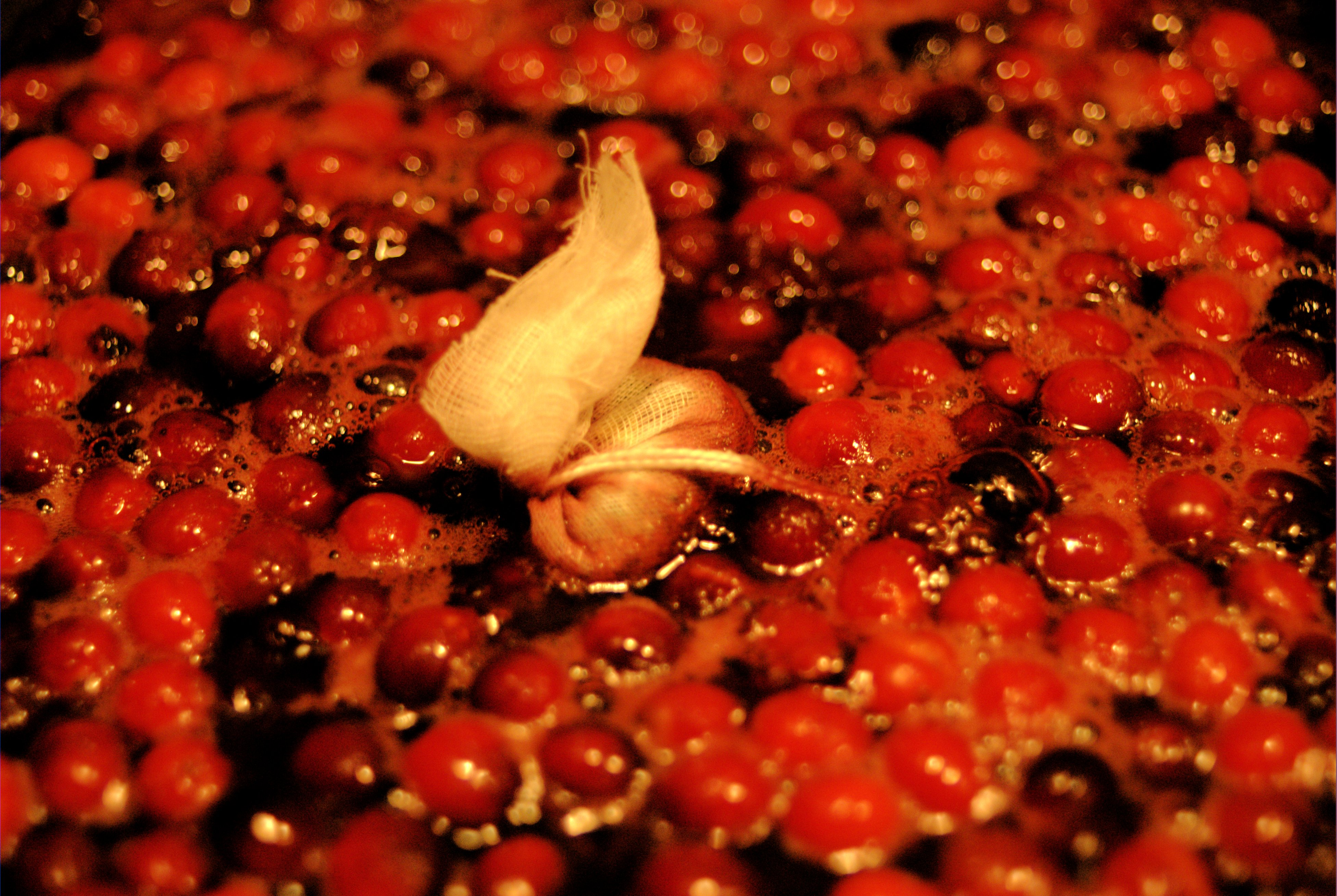
A bouquet garni in cranberry sauce

The bouquet garni (French for "garnished bouquet"; pronounced [bukɛ ɡaʁni]) is a bundle of herbs usually tied with string and mainly used to prepare soup, stock, casseroles and various stews. The bouquet is cooked with the other ingredients and removed prior to consumption. Liquid remaining in the bouquet garni can be wrung out into the dish.

There is no standard recipe for bouquet garni, but most French recipes include thyme, bay leaf and parsley. It may also include basil, burnet, chervil, rosemary, peppercorns, savory and tarragon. Vegetables such as carrot, celery (leaves or leaf stalks), celeriac, leek, onion and parsley root are sometimes included in the bouquet.

Sometimes, the bouquet is not bound with string, and its ingredients are filled into a small sachet, a piece of celery stalk, a net, or a tea strainer instead. Traditionally, the aromatics are bound within leek leaves, though a cheesecloth, muslin or coffee filter tied with butcher twine can be used.

== Sachet d'Épices ==
A sachet d'épices is a small cheesecloth bag containing peppercorns, other spices and herbs (such as parsley, thyme and bay leaves) which similarly adds aromatic flavor to a soup, stock, casserole or stew. It acts as a tea bag, infusing flavor into a liquid. The bag may be tied or untied; in the case of the latter, the liquid is strained afterwards. Like a bouquet, sachets may undergo no, small, or significant variations, from the small additions of a garlic clove or carrot, to the dramatic additions of spices and flavors of ginger, cardamon or cinnamon. The additions depend on the stock being produced: juniper berries and fennel for instance feature in some brown game and duck stocks, while some brown lamb or pork stocks host caraway seeds.

When in cooking a sachet d'épices is added to a preparation depends on the destination's volume, and timing can vary from 15–30 minutes before completion in stocks or soups smaller than a 1 US gallon (3.8 L), to an hour in larger preparations. When the desired flavor is extracted, cooks may remove them from a stock or soup, even before other ingredients contained have finished cooking. This ability to remove the sachet if the desired flavor has been extracted is why some chefs tie the sachet, regardless of whether they will eventually strain the product. Cooking aromatics contained in sachets for an excessive amount of time is avoided by cooks, as the flavors can become "flat", as the flavor compounds they impart, volatile oils, are delicate.

== Use in dishes ==
Dishes made with a bouquet garni include:

- Boeuf bourguignon
- Blanquette de veau
- Bouillabaisse
- Brown Windsor soup
- Carbonnade flamande
- Cassoulet
- Coq au vin
- Court-bouillon
- French onion soup
- Lapin chasseur (huntsman's rabbit)
- Ossobuco
- Pot-au-feu
- Poule au pot
- Tripes à la mode de Caen
