= Flammekueche =

Topped flatbread from Alsace and Germany

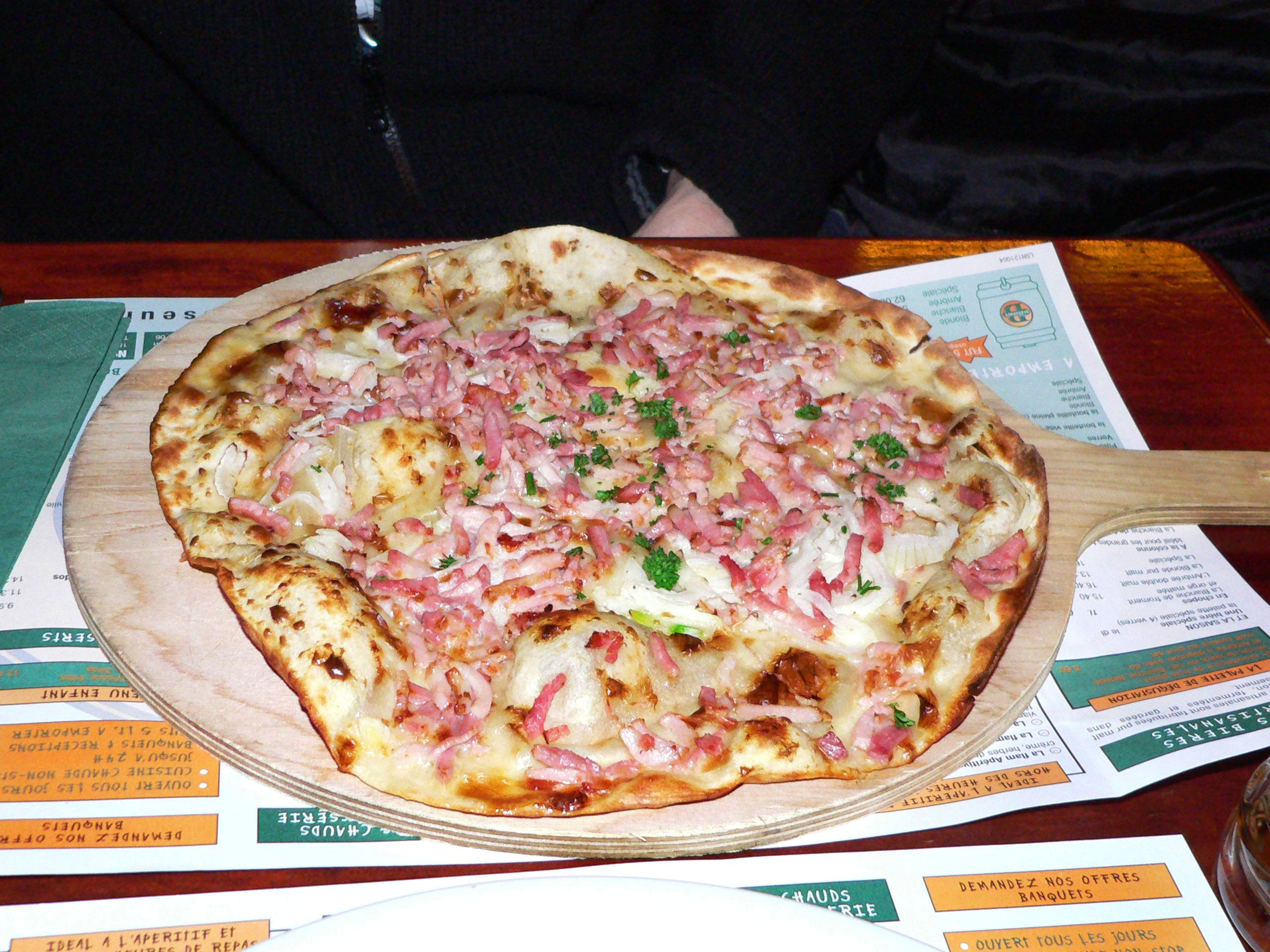
- Alternative names: Flammkuchen, Flàmmeküeche, Flammkuche
- Place of origin: Upper Rhine Valley (Alsace, France and Baden, Germany )
- Main ingredients: Bread dough, fromage frais or crème fraîche, onions, lardons
- Variations: Au Munster, gratinée, forestière, sweet

Flammekueche (Alsatian), Flammkuchen (Standard German), or tarte flambée (French), is a speciality of the region of Alsace, the German-speaking Moselle region, Saarland, Baden and the Palatinate. It is composed of bread dough rolled out very thinly in the shape of a rectangle or oval, which is usually covered with fromage blanc or crème fraîche, thinly sliced onions and lardons.

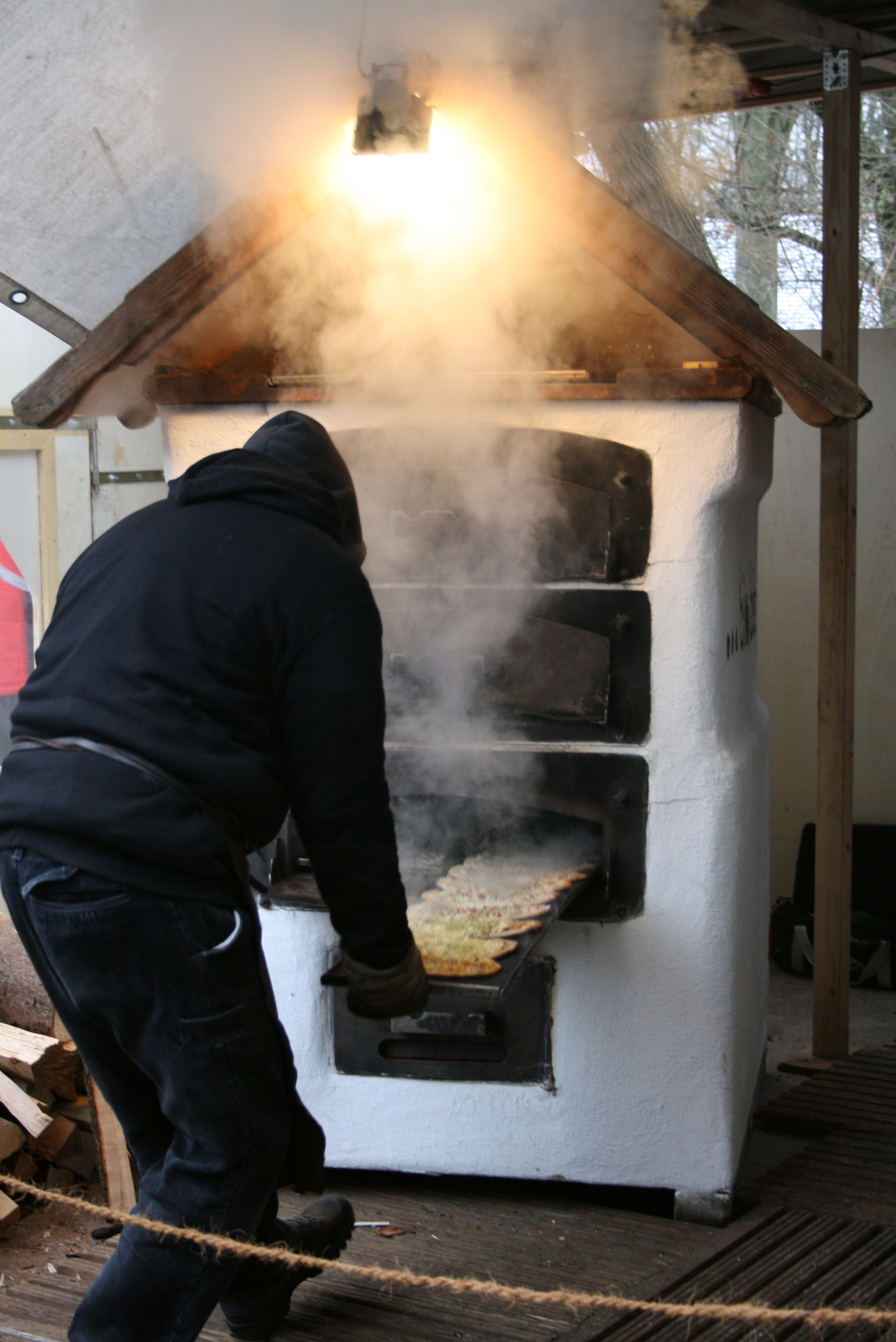
Flammkuchen – fresh out of the oven

The name of the dish varies in local dialects: it is called Flàmmeküeche, or Flàmmaküacha in Alsatian, or Flammkuche in Lorraine Franconian (compare Standard German Flammkuchen). All these variants translate as "(pie) baked in the flames". The German name (rendering Latin panis subcinericeus) appears in Hieronymus Bock's Teutsche Speißkammer (Strasbourg, 1550), denoting unleavened bread baked quickly in ashes or on hot stones.

In Alsace, the French name tarte flambée is the most common name for the dish, while it is known as its Alsatian name "flammekueche" in the rest of France. Contrary to what literal translation would suggest, 'tarte flambée' is not flambéed, but cooked in a wood-fired oven.

== Varieties ==
Historically, toppings varied by region: in the Rhineland it was eaten plain; in the Palatinate and southern Hesse it was spread with plum butter, cream or butter, or topped with bacon or onions; in Alsace it was made with fromage blanc.

There are many variations of the original recipe in terms of the garniture. The standard variations are:

- Gratinée: with added Gruyère cheese;
- Forestière: with added mushrooms;
- Munster: with added Munster cheese;
- Sweet: dessert version with apples and cinnamon, or blueberries, and flambéed with Calvados or another sweet liqueur.

== History ==
Variants of the word appear in Alsatian, Lorraine Franconian, Palatine German, and the dialects of southern Hesse and the Rhineland. In the Palatinate, southern Hesse and the Rhineland, the term denoted a thin flatbread of bread dough baked in the front of the oven on baking day, before the bread. An 1832 handbook on baking describes "so-called Flammkuchen" made from bread dough, baked before the bread and served warm with soup in place of vegetables or meat.

The Flammekueche was originally a homemade dish which did not make its urban restaurant debut until the "pizza craze" of the 1960s. A Flammekueche would be used to test the heat of farmers' wood-fired ovens. At the peak of its temperature, the oven would also have the ideal conditions in which to bake a Flammekueche. The embers would be pushed aside to make room for the cake in the middle of the oven, and the intense heat would be able to bake it in one or two minutes. The crust that forms the border of the Flammekueche would be nearly burned by the flames. The result resembles a thin pizza. The Alsatian term is the original, much older one, having been used by peasants for centuries before being calqued into French as tarte flambée in an 1894 cookbook.

== See also ==
- List of bread dishes
- Ploatz
- Wähe
- Zwiebelkuchen
