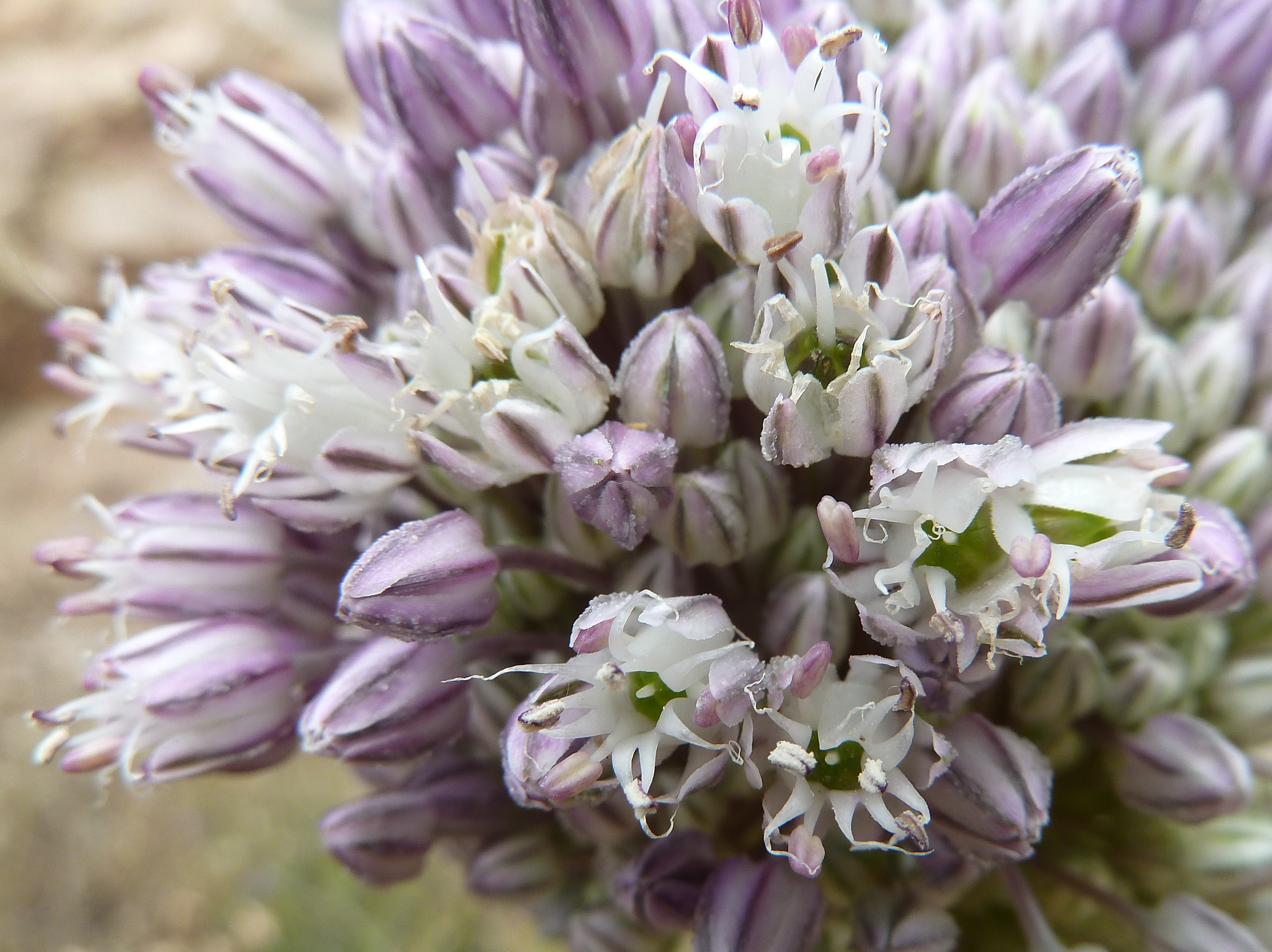

Conservation status
- Least Concern (IUCN 3.1)

Scientific classification
- Kingdom: Plantae
- Clade: Tracheophytes
- Clade: Angiosperms
- Clade: Monocots
- Order: Asparagales
- Family: Amaryllidaceae
- Subfamily: Allioideae
- Genus: Allium
- Subgenus: A. subg. Allium
- Species: A. ampeloprasum

Binomial name
- Allium ampeloprasum L.

Synonyms
- Species synonymy: Allium adscendens Kunth; Allium albescens Guss.; Allium ampeloprasum var. babingtonii (Borrer) Syme; Allium ampeloprasum var. bertolonii (De Not.) Nyman; Allium ampeloprasum var. bulbiferum Syme; Allium ampeloprasum var. bulgaricum Podp.; Allium ampeloprasum var. caudatum Pamp.; Allium ampeloprasum subsp. euampeloprasum Hayek; Allium ampeloprasum var. gasparrinii (Guss.) Nyman; Allium ampeloprasum var. gracile Cavara; Allium ampeloprasum subsp. halleri Nyman; Allium ampeloprasum var. holmense Asch. & Graebn.; Allium ampeloprasum f. holmense (Asch. & Graebn.) Holmboe; Allium ampeloprasum subsp. porrum (L.) Hayek; Allium ampeloprasum var. porrum (L.) J.Gay; Allium ampeloprasum var. pylium (De Not.) Asch. & Graebn.; Allium ampeloprasum subsp. thessalum (Boiss.) Nyman; Allium ampeloprasum var. wiedemannii Regel; Allium ascendens Ten.; Allium babingtonii Borrer; Allium bertolonii De Not.; Allium byzantinum K.Koch; Allium duriaeanum Regel; Allium durieuanum Walp.; Allium gasparrinii Guss.; Allium halleri G.Don; Allium holmense Mill. ex Kunth; Allium kurrat Schweinf. ex K.Krause; Allium laetum Salisb.; Allium lineare Mill.; Allium porraceum Gray; Allium porrum L.; Allium porrum var. ampeloprasum (L.) Mirb.; Allium porrum subsp. euampeloprasum Breistr.; Allium porrum var. kurrat (Schweinf. ex K.Krause) Seregin; Allium pylium De Not.; Allium scopulicola Font Quer; Allium scorodoprasum subsp. babingtonii (Borrer) Nyman; Allium spectabile De Not.; Allium syriacum Boiss.; Allium thessalum Boiss.; Porrum amethystinum Rchb.; Porrum ampeloprasum (L.) Mill.; Porrum commune Rchb.; Porrum sativum Mill.

= Allium ampeloprasum =

Species of plant

Allium ampeloprasum is a member of the onion genus Allium. The wild plant is commonly known as wild leek or broadleaf wild leek. Its native range includes southern Europe, southwestern Asia and North Africa, but it has been cultivated and naturalized in many other countries.

Allium ampeloprasum has been differentiated into five cultivated vegetables: leek, elephant garlic, pearl onion, kurrat, and Persian leek.

== Etymology ==
The specific epithet ampeloprasum derives from the Greek ampelos ("vine") and prason ("leek"), literally meaning "vine-leek" or "leek of the vineyard".

== Description ==
Wild populations produce bulbs up to 3 centimetres (1 1/4 inches) across. Scapes are round in cross-section, each up to 180 cm (71 in) tall, bearing an umbel of as many as 500 flowers. Flowers are urn-shaped, up to 6 millimetres (1/4 inch) across; tepals white, pink or red; anthers yellow or purple; pollen yellow.

== Distribution and habitat ==
Allium ampeloprasum is an ecologically diverse species complex and the progenitor of several key cultivated varieties, including the common leek (A. porrum L. sensu stricto), characterized by its robust "pseudostem," and the A. kurrat Schweinf, which is grown for its slender leaves. Despite their physical differences, these forms remain closely related to, and fully interfertile with, the wild tetraploid A. ampeloprasum, which is widely distributed in the Mediterranean basin.

The plant's native range is southern Europe to southwestern Asia and North Africa, including all countries bordering the Black, Adriatic, and Mediterranean Seas from Portugal to Egypt to Romania. In Russia and Ukraine, it is considered invasive except in Crimea, where it is native. It is also native to Ethiopia, Uzbekistan, Iran and Iraq.

It is considered naturalized in the United Kingdom, Ireland, the Czech Republic, the Baltic States, Belarus, the Azores, Madeira, the Canary Islands, Armenia, Azerbaijan, Afghanistan, China, Australia (all states except Queensland and Tasmania), Mexico, the Dominican Republic, Puerto Rico, Haiti, the United States (southeastern region plus California, New York State, Ohio and Illinois), Galápagos, and Argentina.

The species may have been introduced to Britain by prehistoric people, where its habitat consists of rocky places near the coast in south-west England and Wales.

== Conservation ==
The plant is protected by law in Israel as well as York County, Virginia, where it is commonly known as the "Yorktown onion".

== Cultivation ==
Allium ampeloprasum is the source of several vegetables, most notably:

- Leek (var. porrum)
- Elephant garlic or great-headed garlic (var. ampeloprasum)
- Pearl onion (var. sectivum)
- Kurrat (var. kurrat), Egyptian leek or salad leek. This variety has small bulbs, and primarily the leaves are eaten.
- Persian leek (A. ampeloprasum ssp. persicum). A cultivated allium native to the Middle East and Iran, grown for culinary purposes and called tareh in Persian. The linear green leaves have a mild onion flavor and are eaten raw, either alone, or in food combinations.

Some sources (especially archeological ones) refer to each of these as a separate species, but they are now united as A. ampeloprasum.

== In culture ==
The plant is mentioned as shaḥm el-arḍ in an 11th-century Mishnah commentary.

== Gallery ==
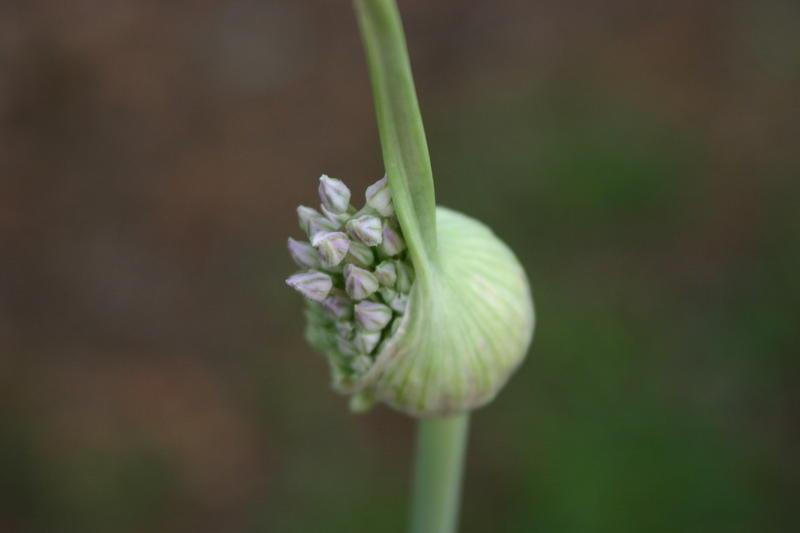
Spathe unfurling to reveal buds

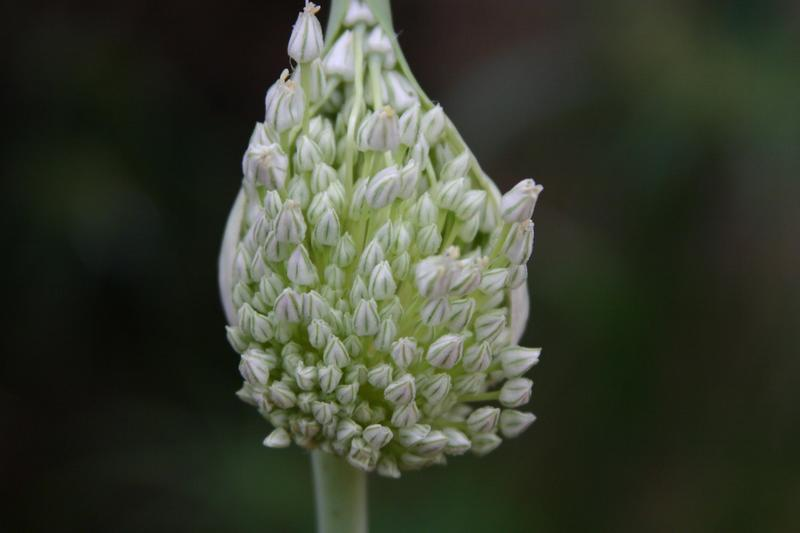
Spathe fully unfurled

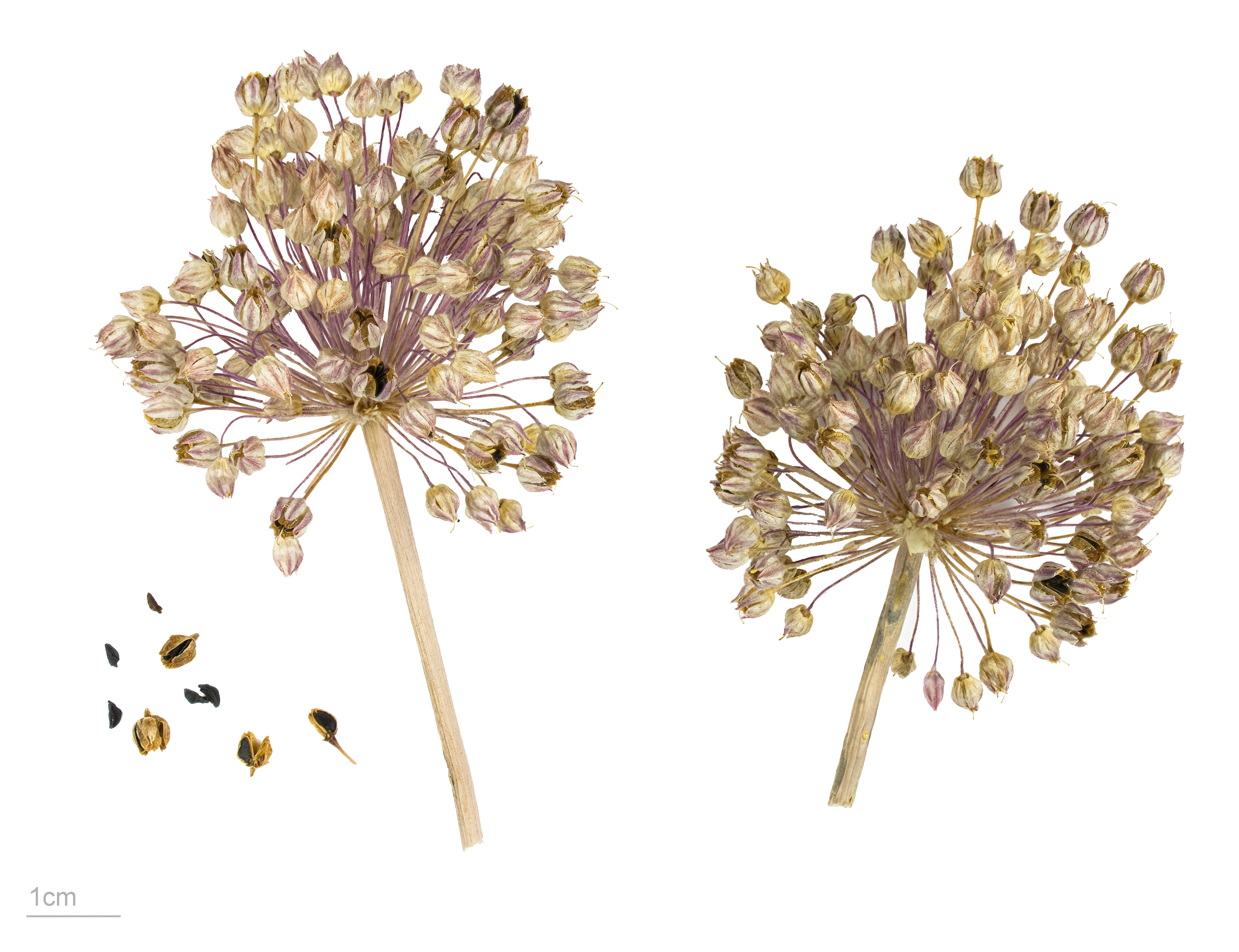
Allium ampeloprasum - MHNT

== See also ==
- Allium tricoccum
- Ramsons
