= Poule au pot =

French chicken stew

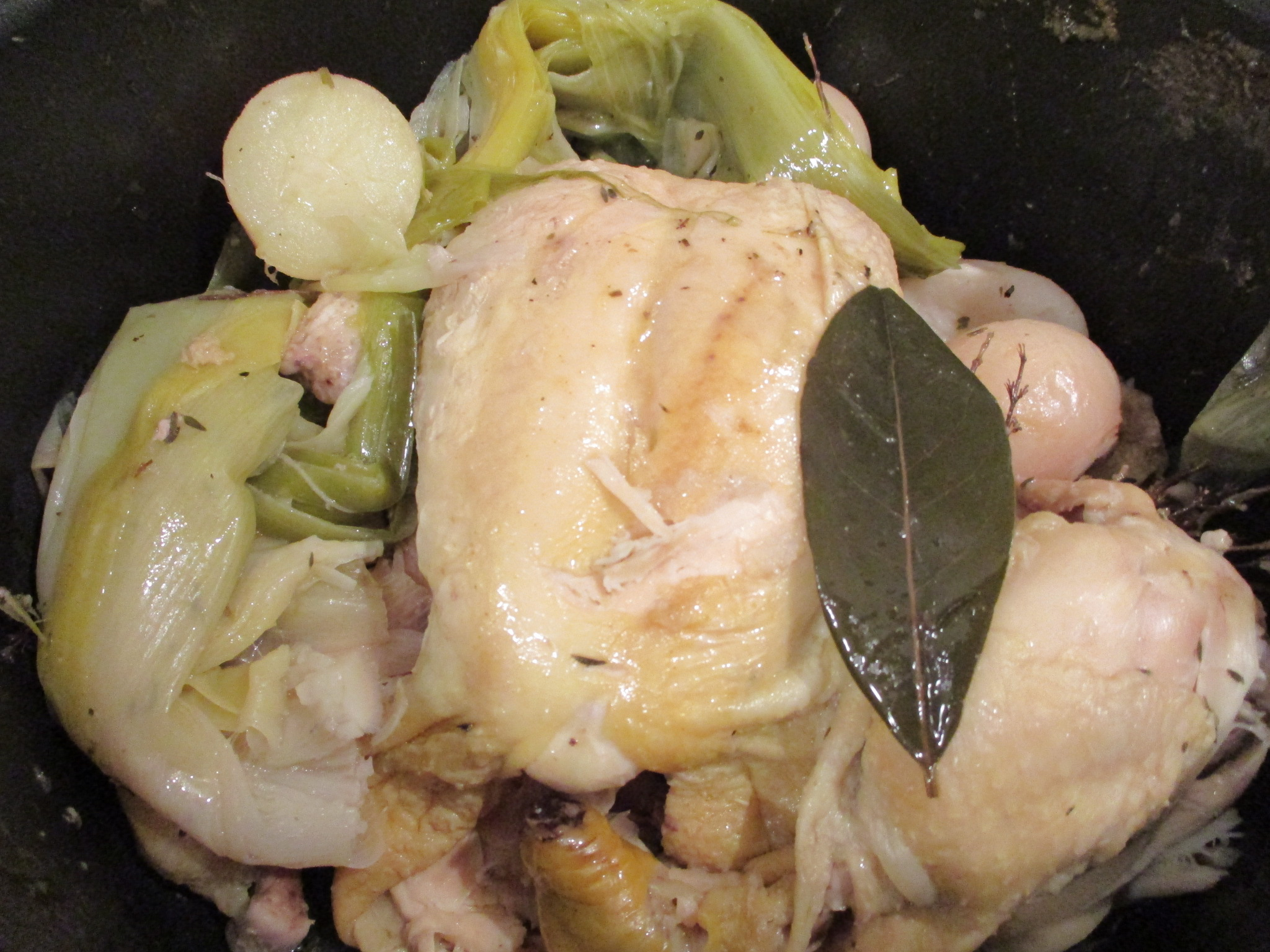
- Type: Main dish
- Place of origin: France
- Main ingredients: Chicken and vegetables (such as carrots, leeks, onions, and celery)
- Similar dishes: Coq au vin; Pot-au-feu

Poule au pot ('chicken in a pot') is a traditional French recipe and a specialty of Béarn cuisine in the French Pyrenees. The dish is a chicken stew cooked in broth in a pot, with vegetables such as carrots, leeks, onions, and celery. King Henry IV of France is rumored to have said that he wanted every table to have poule au pot on Sundays.

== Preparation ==
Poule au pot is typically prepared by first boiling a chicken in a pot of water and skimming the foam. After foam stops forming, the chicken is then simmered in chicken stock. Vegetables — such as carrots, leeks, onions, and celery — are added and cooked until tender. Some recipes call for the chicken to be seasoned with salt, pepper, and chopped garlic, and others recommend adding herbs to the mix, including parsley, rosemary, and thyme. The dish is served as a stew. Some recipe variations recommend stuffing the chicken and adding a white sauce.

== History ==
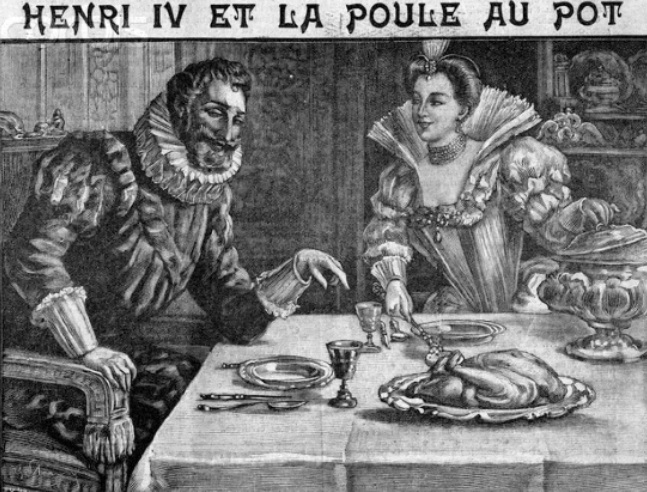
Henry IV and la poule au pot

According to popular myth, poule au pot became an emblematic national French dish thanks to King Henry IV (1553–1610). As the story goes, the king was implementing agricultural reforms after decades of destructive religious wars, and, in a moment of compassion for the people of France, he said to the Duke of Savoy or the Duke of Sully:

Si Dieu me donne encore de la vie, je ferai qu'il n'y aura point de laboureur en mon Royaume qui n'ait moyen d'avoir une poule dans son pot.

Translation:

If God grants me more life, I will ensure that there is no farmer in my kingdom who cannot afford to have a chicken in his pot.

This anecdote was first shared almost half a century later in 1664 by Louis XIV's preceptor, Hardouin de Péréfixe, who was trying to teach the future king to be a benevolent ruler like his grandfather, Henry IV. Although there is no evidence that Henry IV ever actually said this, he and his successors were associated with poule au pot in satirical epigrams over the years.

Henry IV's quote was also repurposed as a political slogan. In the early days of the French Revolution, citizens chanted:

Enfin la poule au pot va être mise.
On peut du moins le présumer.
Car, depuis deux cent ans qu'elle nous est promise.
On n'a cessé de la plumer.

Translation:

Finally, the chicken is going in the pot.
Or so we may presume.
For, in the two hundred years it has been promised to us,
it has done nothing but get plucked.

After the restoration of the French monarchy in the 19th century, King Louis XVIII further adapted the legend. He added that "bon Roi Henri" or "good King Henry" wanted a poule au pot on every table on Sundays. He had a political reason to enhance the story: at the time, he was trying to rehabilitate the reputation of the monarchy.

To this day, poule au pot is a celebrated specialty in Béarn in the French Pyrenees, where King Henry IV was born.
