= Flemish stew =

Flemish meat and vegetable dish

Stoverij
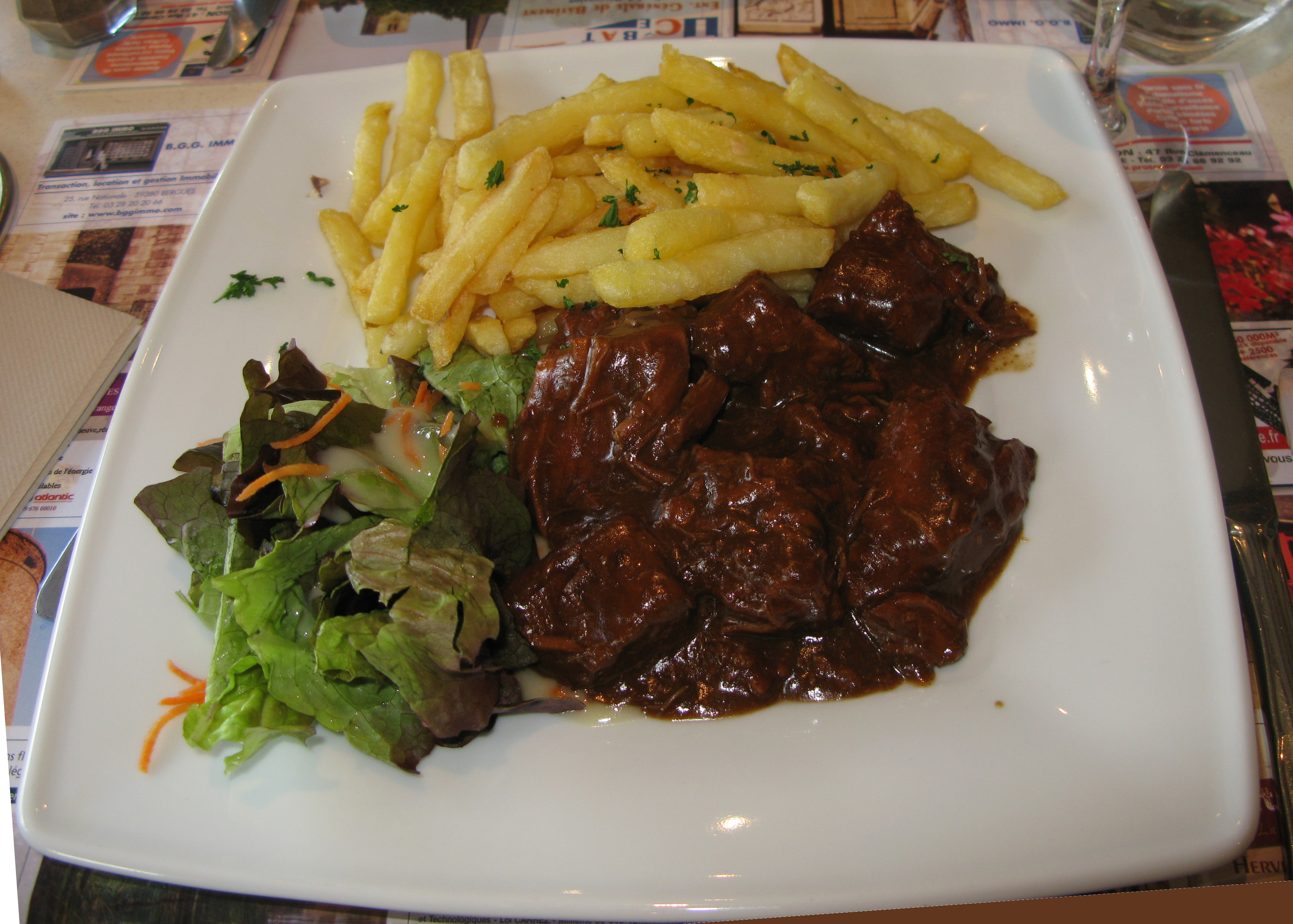
- Stoverij served with Fries
- Type: Stew
- Place of origin: Belgium
- Main ingredients: Beef or pork, onions, beer, thyme, bay

Flemish stew, known in Dutch as stoofvlees (pronounced [ˈstoːfleːs]) or stoverij and in French as carbon(n)ade flamande, is a beef (or pork) stew popular in Belgium, the Netherlands, and French Flanders. It is made with beer and mustard and the sauce is sometimes thickened using bread; seasoning can include bay leaf, thyme, clove, and juniper berries. In East and West Flanders, dried prunes are often added while stewing.

As a staple of Belgian cuisine, recipes vary between regions and households. Variations include swapping bread for gingerbread or speculaas, using extra condiments like Sirop de Liège, and using different kinds of beer. Common beers for this dish include Oud Bruin (Old Brown Beer), Brune Abbey Beer and Flanders Red. Just before serving, a small amount of cider or wine vinegar and either brown sugar or red currant jelly are sometimes added.

Carbonade is often accompanied by French fries, boiled potatoes, apple sauce, or stoemp. It is widely available in restaurants and friteries in Belgium and the Netherlands.

== See also ==
- List of stews
- Beef bourguignon
- Coq au vin
- Belgian cuisine
- Beef stew
