= Ploatz =

Topped flatbread from Hesse and Franconia

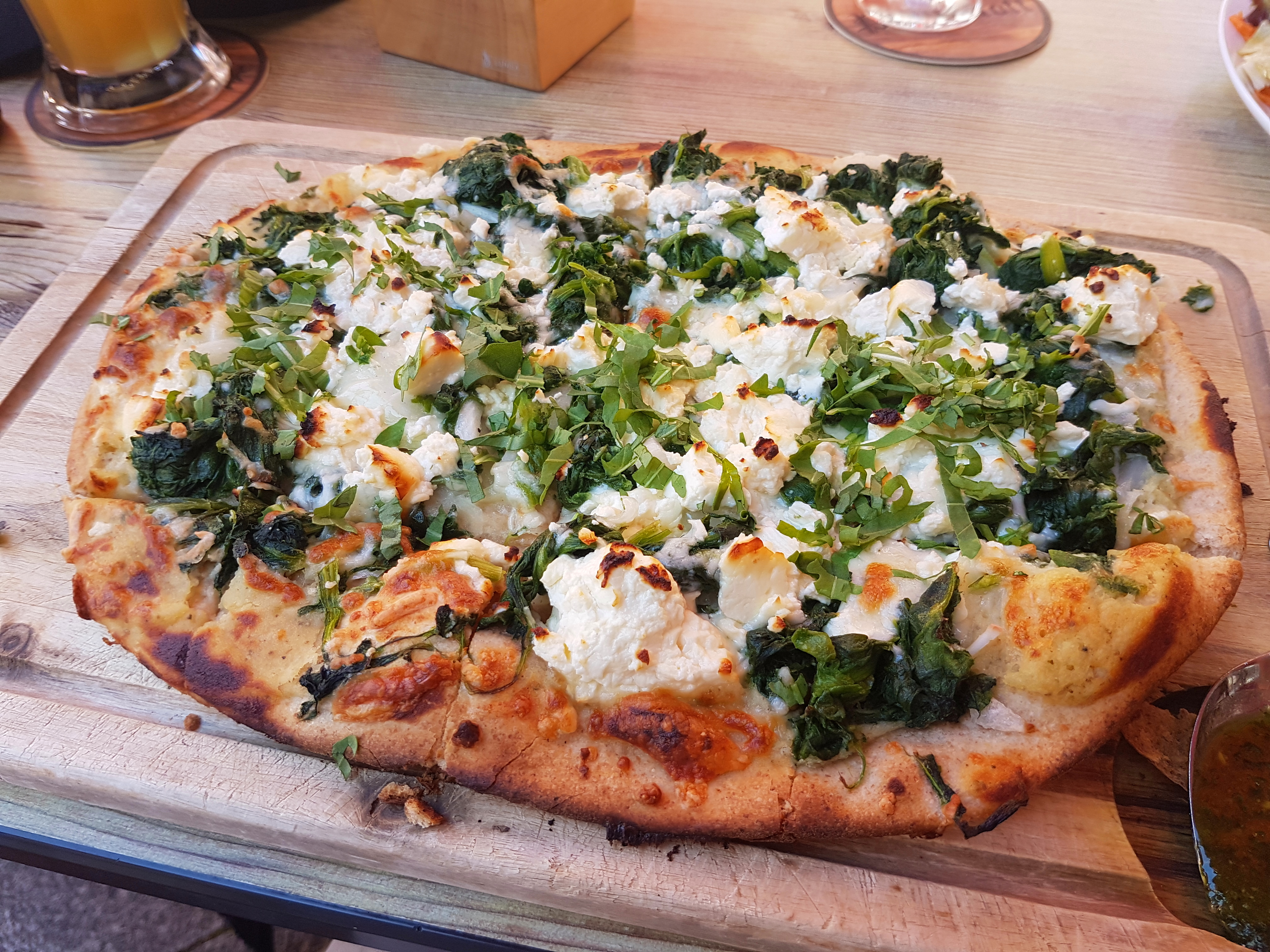
- Rhöner Plootz
- Type: Bread
- Place of origin: Germany
- Region or state: Hesse
- Main ingredients: Rye

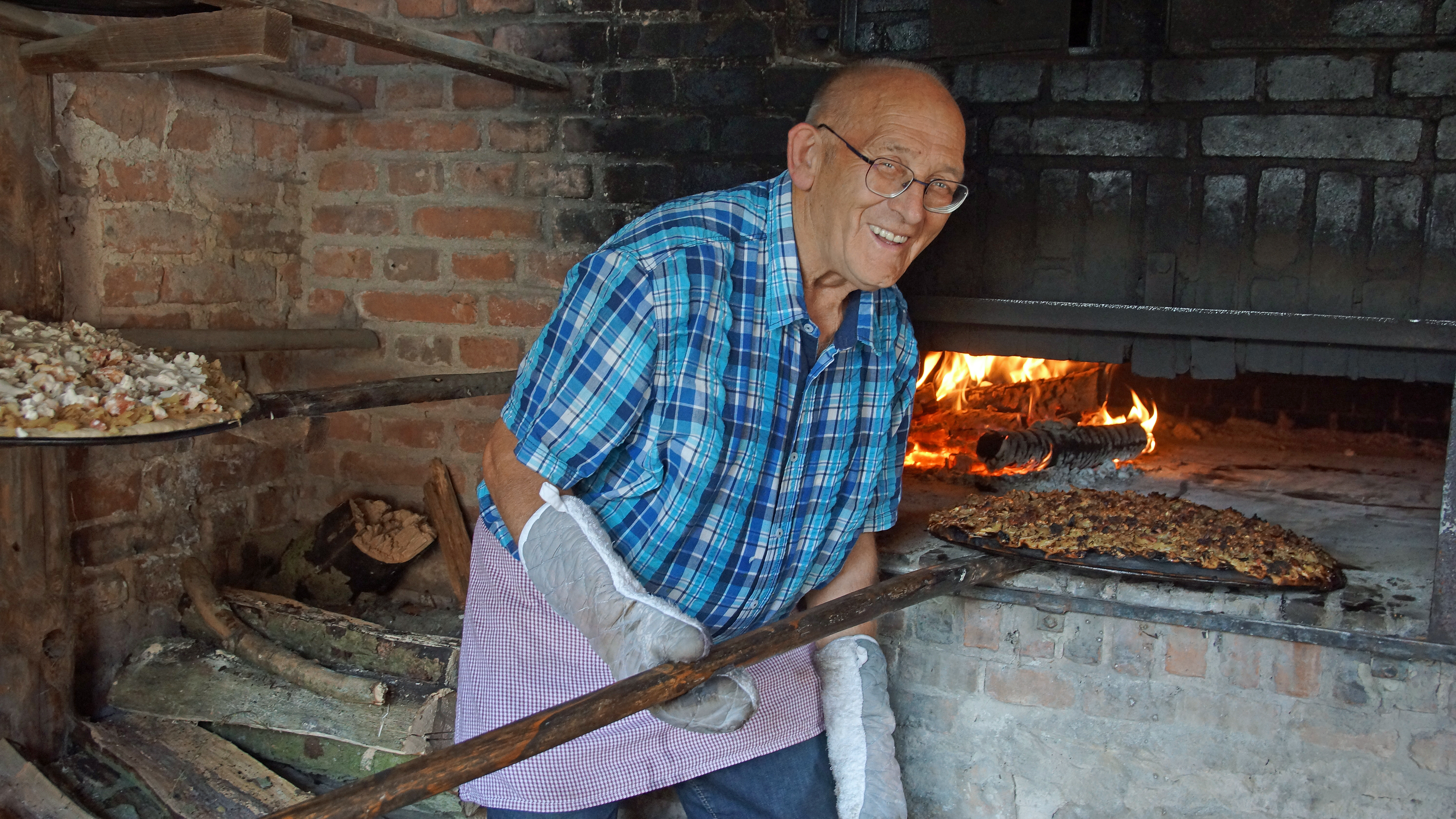
Ploatz from the wood-fired oven at the Tann innkeepers' festival

Ploatz is a hearty sheet cake made of rye bread dough with variable topping, a speciality of the Haune valley of Hesse, Germany. It is common in Upper Hesse, Franconia, Middle Franconia, Rhön and Hohenlohe.
