= Cooking wine =

Grape or rice wines used in cookery

Cooking wine, also known as cooking rice wine or cooking sherry is a type of wine intended for use in cooking rather than drinking.

== Salted ==
In North America, liquor stores and grocery stores sell cooking wines. Those sold in grocery stores contains salt and are marked "not to be used or sold as a beverage" or "contains salt". They are generally regarded by cooking authorities to give the final dish a poor taste, with Shirley Corriher for instance calling them "frequently of poor quality with an acidic off taste". If they are to be used, some caution that less salt should be added at other points in cooking. In some jurisdictions, cooking wine is able to be sold to consumers who would otherwise be too young to purchase drinking wine, with the Food and Drug Administration responsible for the ingredient's regulation in the US.

The large amount of salt gives them a strong sense of salt which many people find unpalatable. Despite this, some alcoholics persist, and a popular stereotype of a depressed housewife has her taking sips from the cooking wine while completing her household work. In the late-1980s, salted Chinese cooking with alcohol content above 38% were banned in Alberta, Canada, after the cheap wine became commonly consumed among the Native American population of Edmonton.

A dry and inexpensive cooking wine made by adding salt is also used in the Latin Caribbean, under the name vino seco. Maricel Presilla calls the ingredient "very popular" in the region, added in cooking after the ingredients in sofrito have melded and the oil begins to separate out.

== Unsalted ==
In China, several wines are sold as ingredients under the name 料酒 (liao jiu), for use in marinades and stir-fries. The most widely used is Shaoxing wine, containing 14-18% alcohol. It has a long shelf-life and is available in the United States, sometimes with salt added. A Japanese cooking wine is called mirin. It contains 14% alcohol and has a sweet taste. Once added, it is often brought to boil to cook off alcohol. It is sold in Japanese and Korean grocers in the US. In Chile, chicha de jora is used as a cooking wine, while for a time in the 1700s, Madeira wine was considered poor quality and only suitable as a cooking wine. While cooking wine is not salted in Taiwan, the notion that cooking wine is unsuitable for consumption persists there as well: the food writers Steven Crook and Katy Hui-wen Hung report that, "only dipsomaniacs guzzle the rice wine that cooks keep handy".

== History ==
The practice of adding salt to wine so it could be sold for flavouring dishes came into practice in the United States during the Prohibition era, (Note: One recipe from the Prohibition era for a 'Turtle Soup de Famille' suggests adding sherry flavouring, grape juice, or "if you are lucky enough to have some", cooking wine.) with instructions to use less salt elsewhere in cooking. Cooking wines were not the only way manufacturers sold wine for use in cooking during the ban, Claro and Sherry-Jel, advertised as "pure claret in syrup form" and "pure sherry made semi-solid" were promoted for use in sauces and soups. Wines intended for use in cooking are much older. The Romans used the sweet Spanish passum as a cooking wine, as well as the syrupy defrutum, which ones sources describes as a cooking wine. In China, cooking wine is mentioned in the 12th century cookbook Shanjia qinggong as part of a marinade used on slices of rabbit meat.

== See also ==
- Cooking with wine

== Sources ==
- Alford, Jeffrey; Duguid, Naomi (1998). Seductions of Rice: A Cookbook. Toronto, Ontario: Random House Canada. ISBN 0-679-30932-2.
- Almila, Anna-Mari (2026). Wine and Gender: Tracing Interconnections. Routledge Critical Beverage Studies. Abingdon, Oxfordshire & New York: Routledge. ISBN 978-1-032-84141-0.
- Clements, Jonathan (2022) [2021]. The Emperor's Feast: A History of China in Twelve Meals. London: Hodder. ISBN 978-1-5293-3243-8.
- Corriher, Shirley (1997). CookWise: The Hows and Whys of Successful Cooking (1st ed.). New York: William Morrow & Company, Inc. ISBN 0-688-10229-8.
- Crook, Steven; Hung, Katy Hui-wen (2018). A Culinary History of Taipei: Beyond Pork and Ponlai. Big City Food Biographies. Lanham, Maryland: Rowman & Littlefield. ISBN 978-1-5381-0137-7.
- Dunlop, Fuchsia (2003) [2001]. Land of Plenty: A Treasury of Authentic Sichuan Cooking. New York: W.W. Norton. ISBN 0-393-05177-3.
- Kte'pi, Bill (2015a). "Nonbeverage Alcohols, History of". In Martin, Scott C (ed.). The Sage Encyclopedia of Alcohol: Social, Cultural, and Historical Perspectives. Thousand Oaks, California: Sage. ISBN 978-1-4833-2525-5.
- Kte'pi, Bill (2015b). "Peru". In Martin, Scott C (ed.). The Sage Encyclopedia of Alcohol: Social, Cultural, and Historical Perspectives. Thousand Oaks, California: Sage. ISBN 978-1-4833-2525-5.
- Lovegren, Sylvia (2005) [1995]. Fashionable Food: Seven Decades of Food Fads. Chicago, Illinois: University of Chicago Press. ISBN 0-226-49407-1.
- Mittelman, Amy (2003). "Alcohol". In Blocker, Jack S; Fahey, David M; Tyrrell, Ian R (eds.). Alcohol and Temperance in Modern History: An International Encyclopedia. Santa Barbara, California: ABC-CLIO. ISBN 1-57607-833-7.
- Nossiter, Sharon Stallworth (2009). "turtle soup". In Tucker, Susan (ed.). New Orleans Cuisine: Fourteen Signature Dishes and Their Histories. Jackson, Mississippi: University Press of Mississippi. pp. 87–97. ISBN 978-1-60473-127-9.
- Presilla, Maricel E. (2012). Gran Cocina Latina: The Food of Latin America. New York & London: W. W. Norton & Company. ISBN 978-0-393-05069-1.
- Renfrew, Jane (1985). Food and Cooking in Roman Britain: History and Recipes. London: English Heritage. ISBN 1-85074-534-X.
- Siegel, Adam (2015). "Portugal". In Martin, Scott C (ed.). The Sage Encyclopedia of Alcohol: Social, Cultural, and Historical Perspectives. Thousand Oaks, California: Sage. ISBN 978-1-4833-2525-5.
- The Science of Good Cooking: Master 50 Simple Concepts to Enjoy a Lifetime of Success in the Kitchen. Brookline, Massachusetts: America's Test Kitchen. 2012. ISBN 978-1-933615-98-1.
- Zimmermann, Petra A (2015). "Cooking with Alcohol". In Martin, Scott C (ed.). The Sage Encyclopedia of Alcohol: Social, Cultural, and Historical Perspectives. Thousand Oaks, California: Sage. ISBN 978-1-4833-2525-5.
