= Pearl onion =

Variety of onion

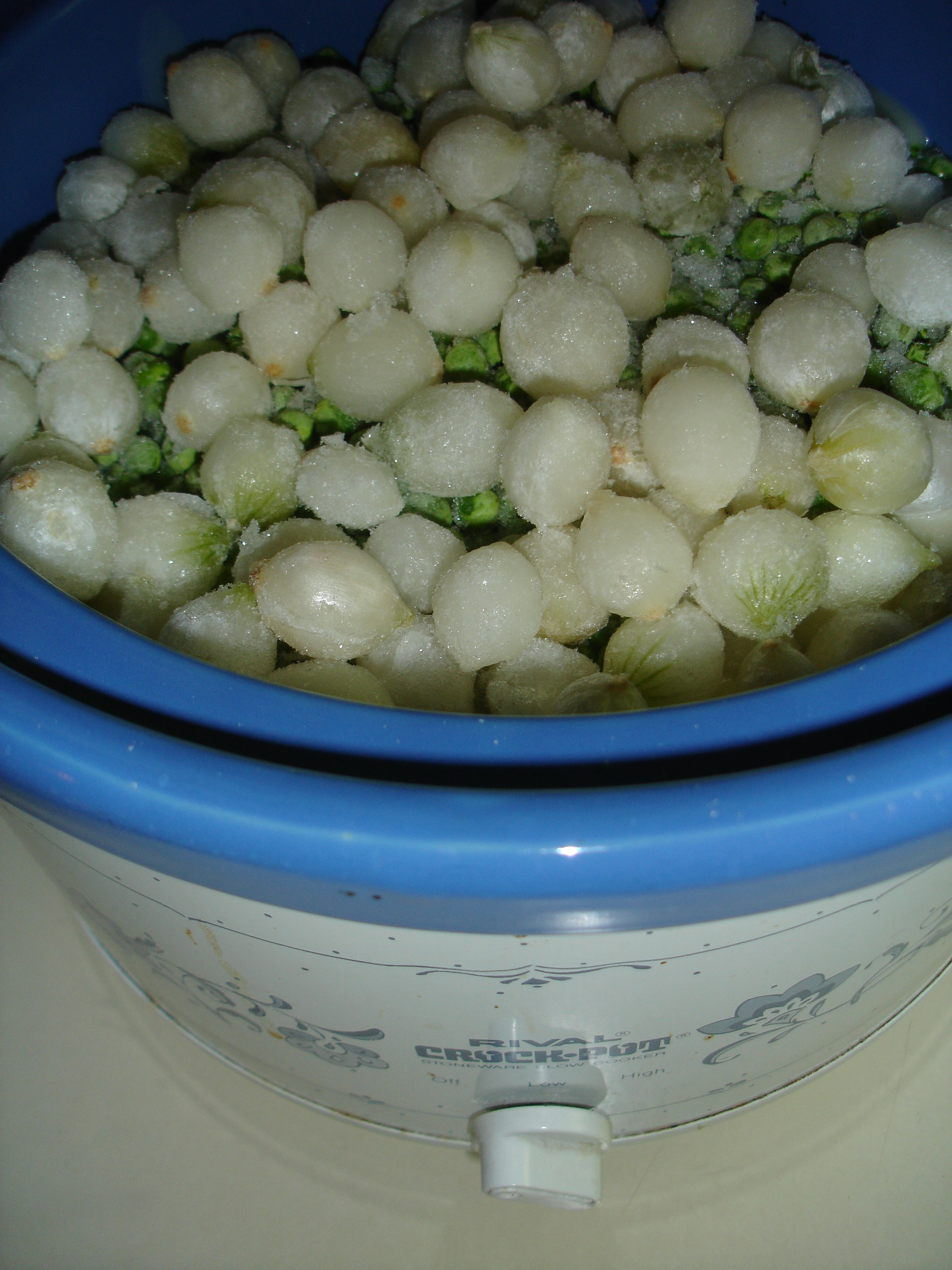
- Pearl onions and peas topping a crockpot dish
- Species: Allium ampeloprasum var. sectivum or A. ampeloprasum 'Pearl-Onion Group'
- Cultivar: 'Pearl onion'

The pearl onion (Allium ampeloprasum var. sectivum or A. ampeloprasum 'Pearl-Onion Group'), also known as button onion, baby onion or silverskin onion in the UK, is a close relative of the leek (A. ampeloprasum var. porrum), and may be distinguished from common onions by having only a single storage leaf, similar to cloves of garlic. In French they are known as oignon grelot. One English-speaking reference also mentions the term petit poireau antillais.

== Cultivation and storage ==
Pearl onions are cultivated mostly in Germany, the Netherlands, and Italy, usually in home gardens, although formerly on a commercial scale. They are mostly used for pickling.

== Consumption ==
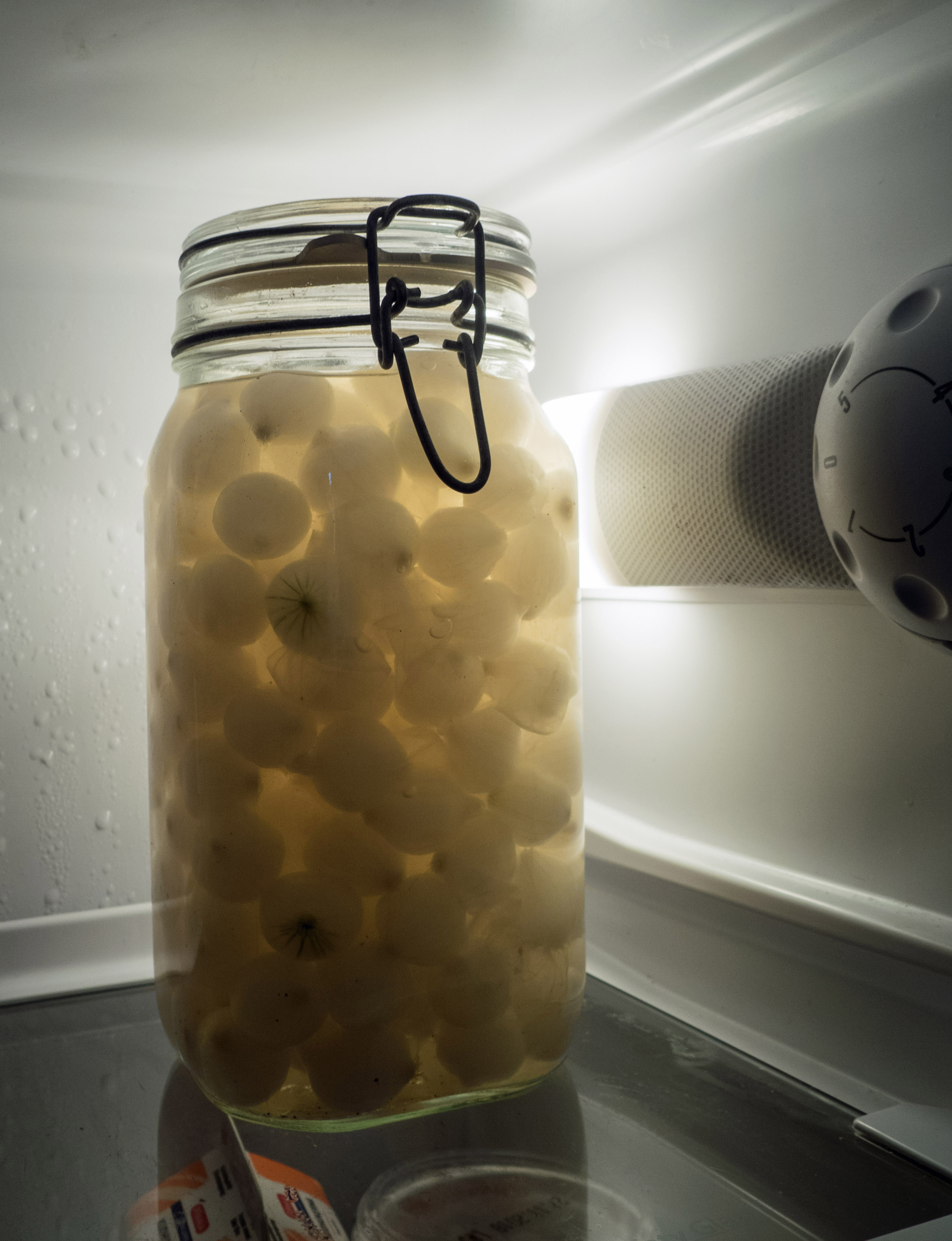
Pickled pearl onions.

Because of its uniquely small size and a taste sweeter than that of a common onion, it has also been used in dishes ranging from mid-20th-century American casserole dishes such as succotash to sweetly flavored onion relishes in Indian cuisine. It can also be used in stews, soups or sautéed (fried) with other vegetables. It can also be used in cocktails such as "martini standing".

Pearl onions are a staple to the cuisine of Northern Europe. Also in modern Europe they are used as a flowering plant.

Pearl onions contain chemical compounds that have health benefits including helping cardiovascular health and stabilize blood sugar levels, and acting as an antioxidant and anti-inflammatory.

== Common onions as a substitute ==
The majority of onions grown for pickling are common onions (A. cepa), which are normally much larger, but are grown to a small size suitable for pickling by planting them so densely that each one has very little room to grow. Common onions grown in this way are often referred to as "pearl onions" even though they do not belong to the same species as true pearl onions.

White varieties of common onions grown in this way for pickling include Crystal Wax and White Bermuda. There are red varieties as well, which are milder in flavour. Common onions grown from seed to produce small bulbs for pickling are ready to harvest in 90 days. In their fresh state they can be stored for up to a month in a cool, dry, dark place.

== Cultural references ==
Larry Wall's yearly State of the Onion speeches about advancements in Perl programming, an allusion to the many layers of the language, are named as a pun both on the pearl onion and the U.S. president's State of the Union addresses.
