= Lardon =

Small cubes of fatty pork, possibly cured

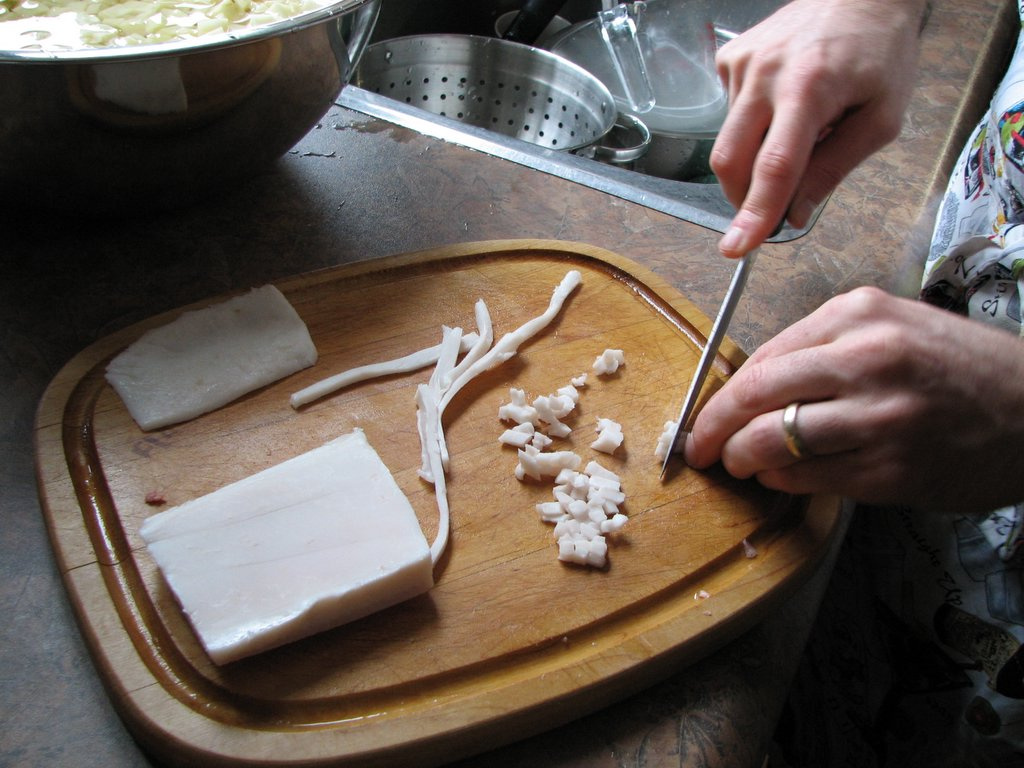
Preparation of lardons from fatback

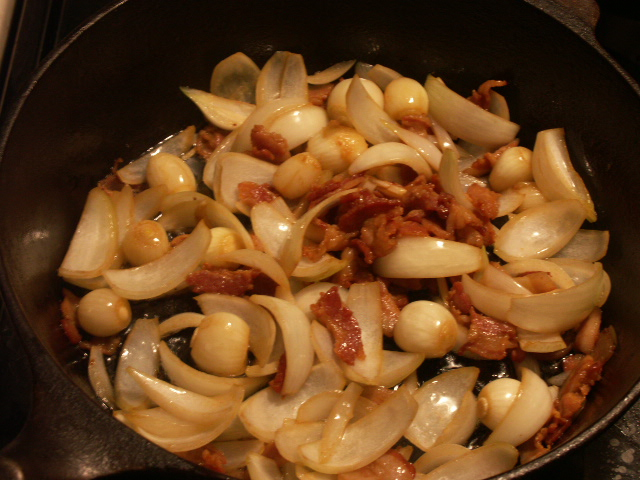
The lardon, onions and garlic being prepared for a coq au vin

A lardon, also spelled lardoon, is a small strip or cube of fatty bacon, or occasionally pork fat (usually subcutaneous fat), used in a wide variety of cuisines to flavor savory food and salads. In French cuisine, lardons are also used for larding, by threading them with a needle into meats that are to be braised or roasted. Lardons are not normally smoked, and they are made from pork that has been cured with salt.

In French cuisine, lardons are served hot in salads and salad dressings, as well as on some tartes flambées, stews such as beef bourguignon, quiches such as Quiche Lorraine, in omelettes, with potatoes, and for other dishes such as coq au vin.

The Oxford English Dictionary defines "lardon" as "one of the pieces of bacon or pork which are inserted in meat in the process of larding", giving primacy to that process. According to the Middle English Dictionary, the earliest occurrence of the word is in 1381, in the work The Forme of Cury; it advises to insert lardons in cranes and herons.

== Preparation ==
Lardons may be prepared from different cuts of pork, including pork belly and fatback, or from cured cuts such as bacon or salt pork. According to food writer Regina Schrambling, when the lardon is salt-cured but not smoked in the style of American bacon, "the flavor comes through cleanly, more like ham but richer because the meat is from the belly of the pig, not the leg". The meat (fat) is usually cut into small strips or cubes about one centimeter (3/8 inch) wide, then blanched or fried.

Some chefs recommend using pancetta as a substitute; ham is also suggested.

== Usage ==
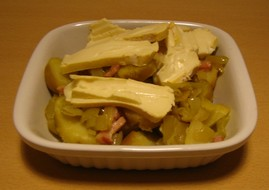
Tartiflette with lardons

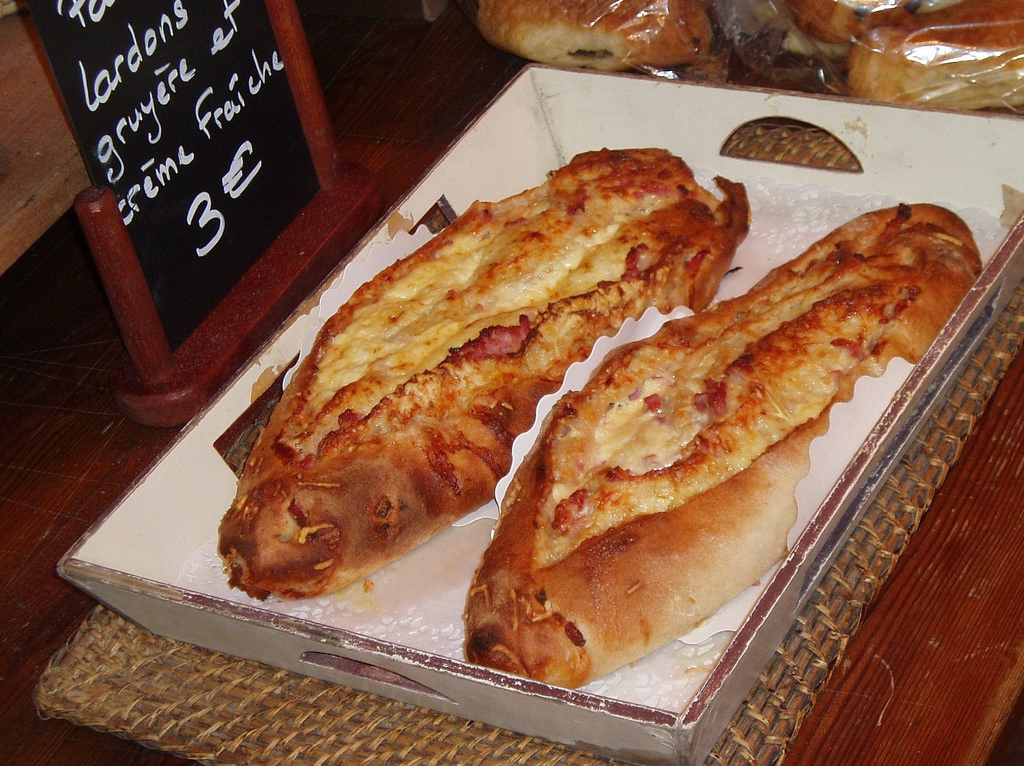
Fougasse de Foix, a provincial French bread filled with melted gruyère cheese (reblochon cheese can also be used), bacon lardons, and crème fraîche

It is common for the lardons to be used for two distinct purposes in the same dish. The fat rendered from the cubed pork is good for sautéing vegetables or meat during the early stages of a recipe, and the crisp browned pork cubes can be added as a garnish or ingredient just before serving: "the crispy bits are used to add a smoky, salty flavor and a pleasant crunch to all kinds of dishes". The rich flavor pairs well with cheeses and sturdy leaf vegetables like spinach and frisée, for which the hot rendered fat can be used as part of the salad dressing.

Lardons are frequently used in French cuisine to flavor salads, stews (such as beef bourguignon and coq au vin), quiches (quiche Lorraine), potatoes, omelettes and other dishes. A particular Parisian use of lardons is in the salade aux lardons, a wilted salad (often made with frisée (endive) lettuce) in which the lettuce leaves are wilted slightly by the addition of still-hot lardons and hot vinaigrette. A nineteenth-century recipe for a pie à la chasse calls for beef to be larded with lardons made of ham and bacon. A traditional dish from the Alsace region is the tarte flambée, a thin pizza-like bread covered with crème fraîche, onion, and lardons. A regional specialty from the Savoie is tartiflette, which is made with potatoes, reblochon cheese, cream, and lardons.

== Larding ==
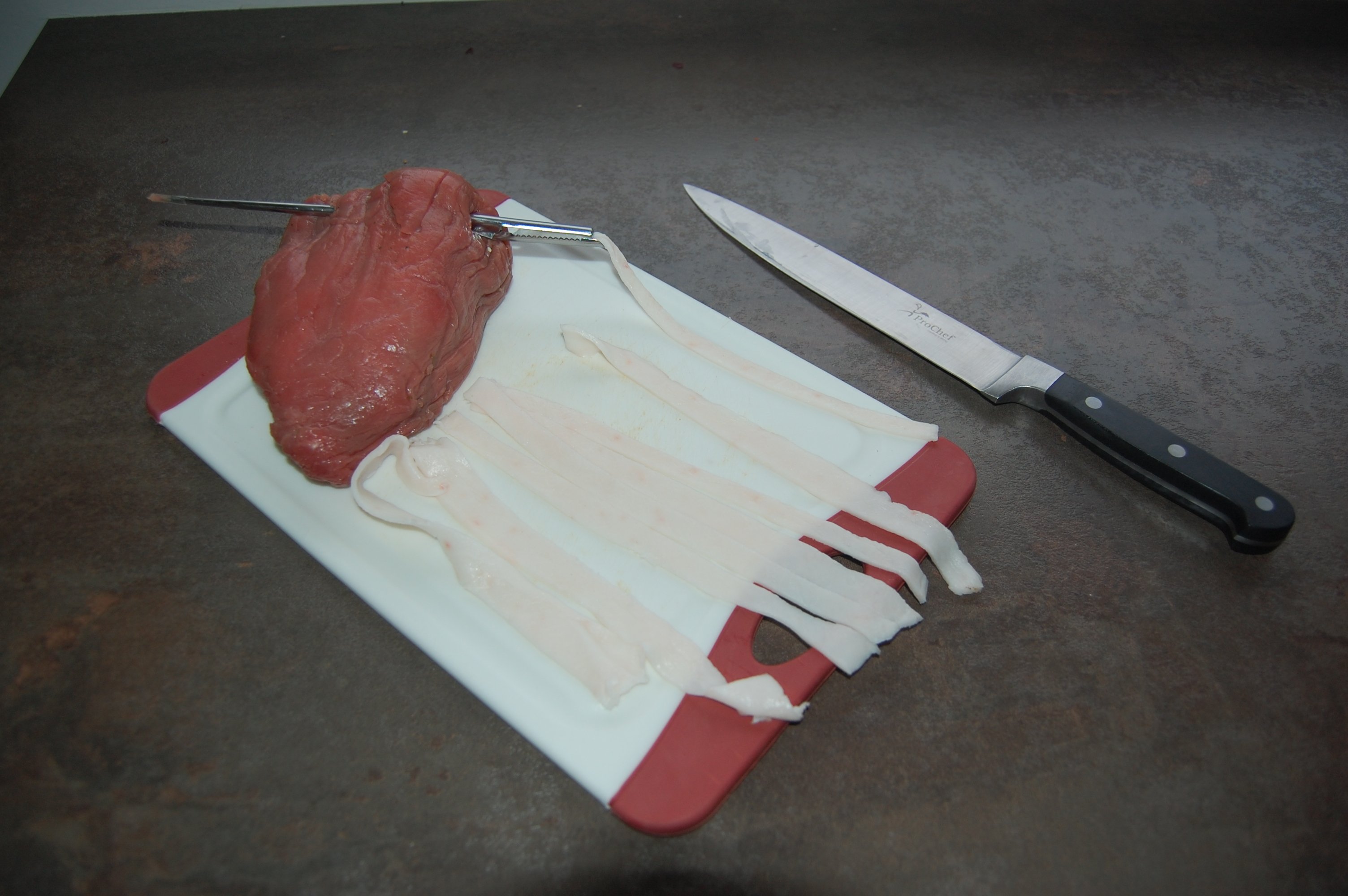
Larding of a piece of beef, using a larding needle

A traditional use for lardons is in a technique called "larding", in which long strips of chilled pork fat are threaded (with the use of a needle) into meats that are to be braised or roasted, such as beef filets or veal (especially lean cuts), poultry, and lean fish such as tuna. These lardons are cut in strips about 3 mm thick and 3 mm wide, and the fat is chilled before cutting and threading. The technique is explained at length in the classic book of French cuisine La bonne cuisine de Madame E. Saint-Ange, which details two techniques: surface larding, or "studding", in which the lardons are threaded onto the surface, and interior larding, in which the lardons are left in a channel (made with a larger-sized needle than is used for studding) inside the meat.

Madame St. Ange recommends larding for braised calf's sweetbreads (as does The French Laundry Cookbook) and for a specific style of cooking hare. American food writer James Peterson specifically recommends using fatback for larding; salt pork, he says, "has a funny taste and won't work". Julia Child recommends using lard or porkbellies (pancetta); she too thinks that neither salt pork nor bacon work, and suggests blanching these first, to get rid of the overwhelming cured or smoked flavors.

The origin of larding is in the Middle Ages, when hunting game was a popular activity amongst the upper classes and the meat acquired from it was often too lean and tough because of the animal's natural physical activity; larding provided the equivalent of today's marbling.

The needle used is a larding needle (also "barding needle" or lardoir). There are two basic kinds of larding needle, hollow and U-shaped. Hollow larding needles are about 5 mm in diameter with some sort of teeth or hook to keep the lard strip attached; they are passed completely through the meat. U-shaped larding needles, often called by the French name lardoir, are long needles with a "U" cross-section.

Four larding needles, accompanied by two crossed turning spits, are found in the coat of arms of the Confrérie de la Chaîne des Rôtisseurs, a French gastronomic society.

== In other cuisines ==
In many cuisines around the world, pork fat is used as a flavoring, and lardons are found in various other cultures. In Puerto Rico, they are called tocino and are added to dishes such as arroz con gandules.

In Dutch cuisine lardons are used in many traditional dishes such as stamppot, and the split pea soup snert.

== See also ==
- Barding
- Lard
- Lardo
- Salo
