= Bourguignon (surname) =

Bourguignon is a French surname. Notable people with the surname include:

- André Bourguignon (1920–1996), French psychiatrist
- Anne Bourguignon, French actress, known as Anémone (1950–2019), daughter of André
- François Bourguignon (born 1945), French economist
- Giulia Bourguignon Marinho, known as Giulia Be (born 1999), Brazilian singer
- Erika Bourguignon (1924–2015), American anthropologist
- Jean-Pierre Bourguignon (born 1947), French mathematician
- Louis Dominique Bourguignon (18th century), French highwayman
- Philippe Bourguignon (born 1948), French businessman
