= Beef bourguignon =

French beef dish

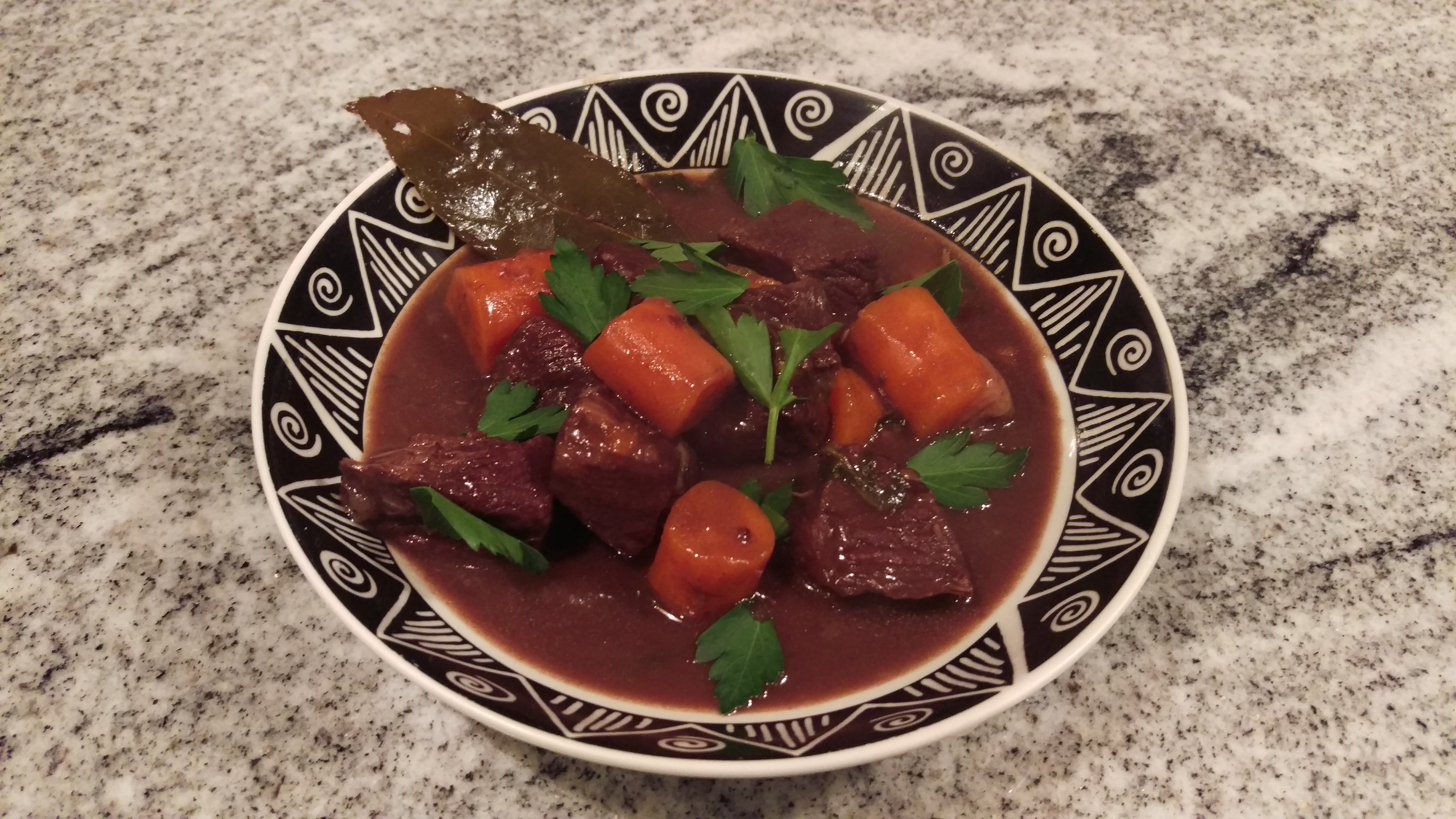
- A dish of bœuf bourguignon
- Alternative names: Bœuf bourguignon, bœuf à la bourguignonne
- Type: Stew
- Place of origin: France
- Region or state: Paris
- Main ingredients: Beef, red wine (often red Burgundy), beef stock, lardons, onions, bouquet garni, pearl onions, mushrooms

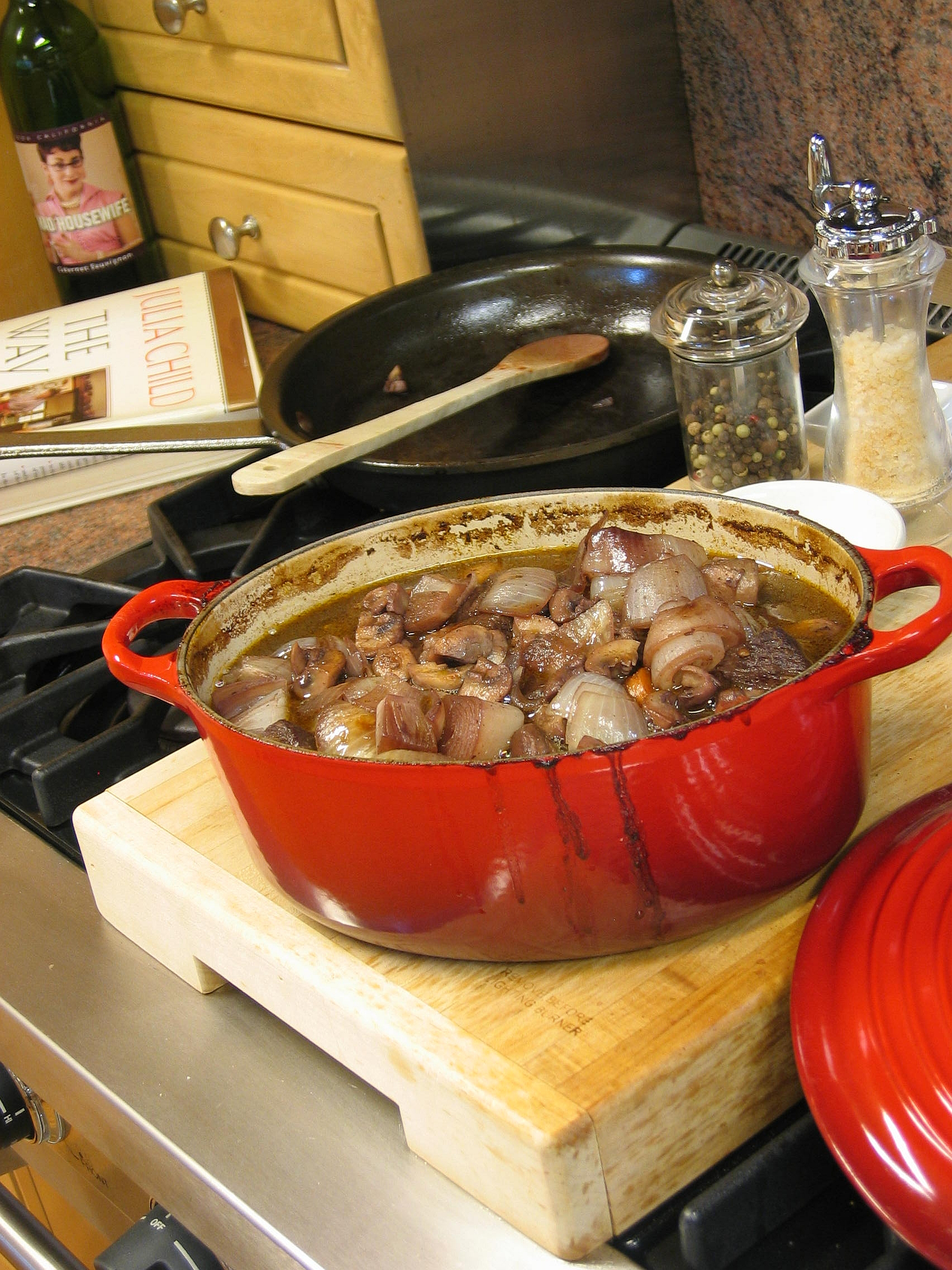
Beef bourguignon cooked in a Dutch oven

Beef bourguignon (/ˌbʊər.ɡɪn.ˈjɒ̃/) or bœuf bourguignon (UK: /ˌbɜːf ˈbɔːrɡɪn.jɒ̃/, US: /ˌbʊf ˌbərɡɪnˈjɑːn/; French: [bœf buʁɡiɲɔ̃]), is a French stew of beef braised in red wine, often red Burgundy, and beef stock, typically flavored with carrots, onions, garlic, and a bouquet garni, and garnished with pearl onions and mushrooms.

"Bourguignon" is, since the mid-nineteenth century, a culinary term applied to various dishes prepared with wine or with a mushroom and onion garnish. It is probably not a regional recipe from Burgundy.

When made with whole roasts, the meat was often larded.

== History ==
The dish is often "touted as traditional", but it was first documented in 1867, and "does not appear to be very old". Other recipes called "à la Bourguignonne" with similar garnishes were found in the mid-19th century for leg of lamb and for rabbit. In the 19th century, it "did not enjoy a great reputation", perhaps because it was often made with leftover cooked meat.

The dish has become a standard of French cuisine, notably in Parisian bistrots; however, it only began to be considered a Burgundian specialty in the twentieth century.

The co-authors of Mastering the Art of French Cooking, Simone Beck, Louisette Bertholle, and Julia Child, have described the dish as "certainly one of the most delicious beef dishes concocted by man".

== Serving ==
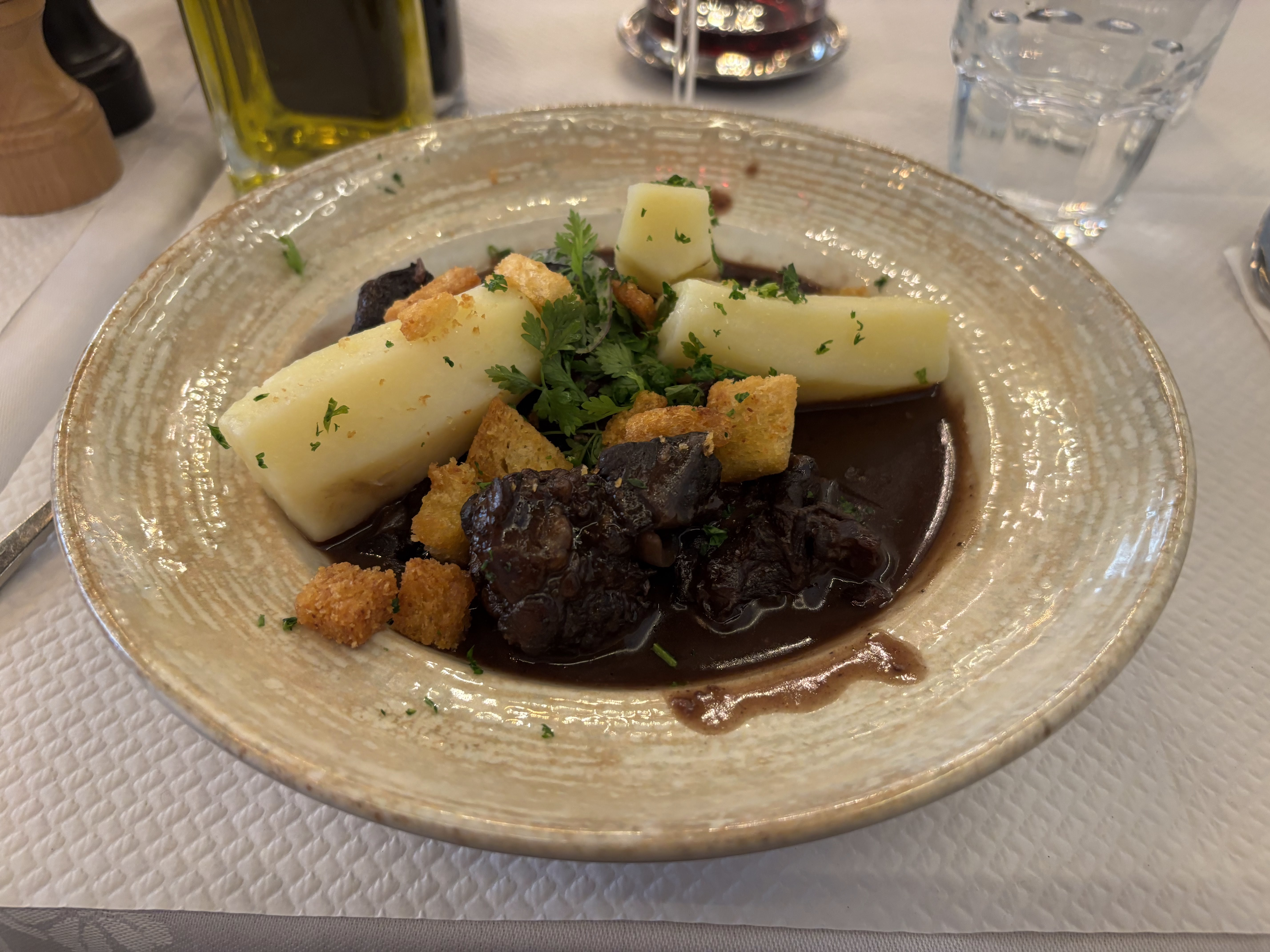
Beef bourguignon with boiled potatoes, as served at the Paris Beaubourg bistro in Paris

Beef bourguignon is generally accompanied by boiled potatoes, but often also with mashed potatoes or pasta.

== Name and spellings ==
The dish may be called bourguignon or à la bourguignonne in both French and English. It is occasionally called beef/bœuf bourguignonne in American English, but in French and non-American English, by far the most common name is bœuf bourguignon.

== See also ==
- Beef shank – Cut of beef
- Beef stroganoff – Russian sautéed beef dish with sauce
- Carbonade flamande – Flemish meat and vegetable dish
- Coq au vin – French style chicken stew
- Daube – French stew of beef braised in wine and garlic
- Hayashi rice – Japanese rice dish
- Oeufs en meurette – French egg dish
- Sauce bourguignonne – French red wine sauce
- List of stews
