= Coq au vin =

French style chicken stew

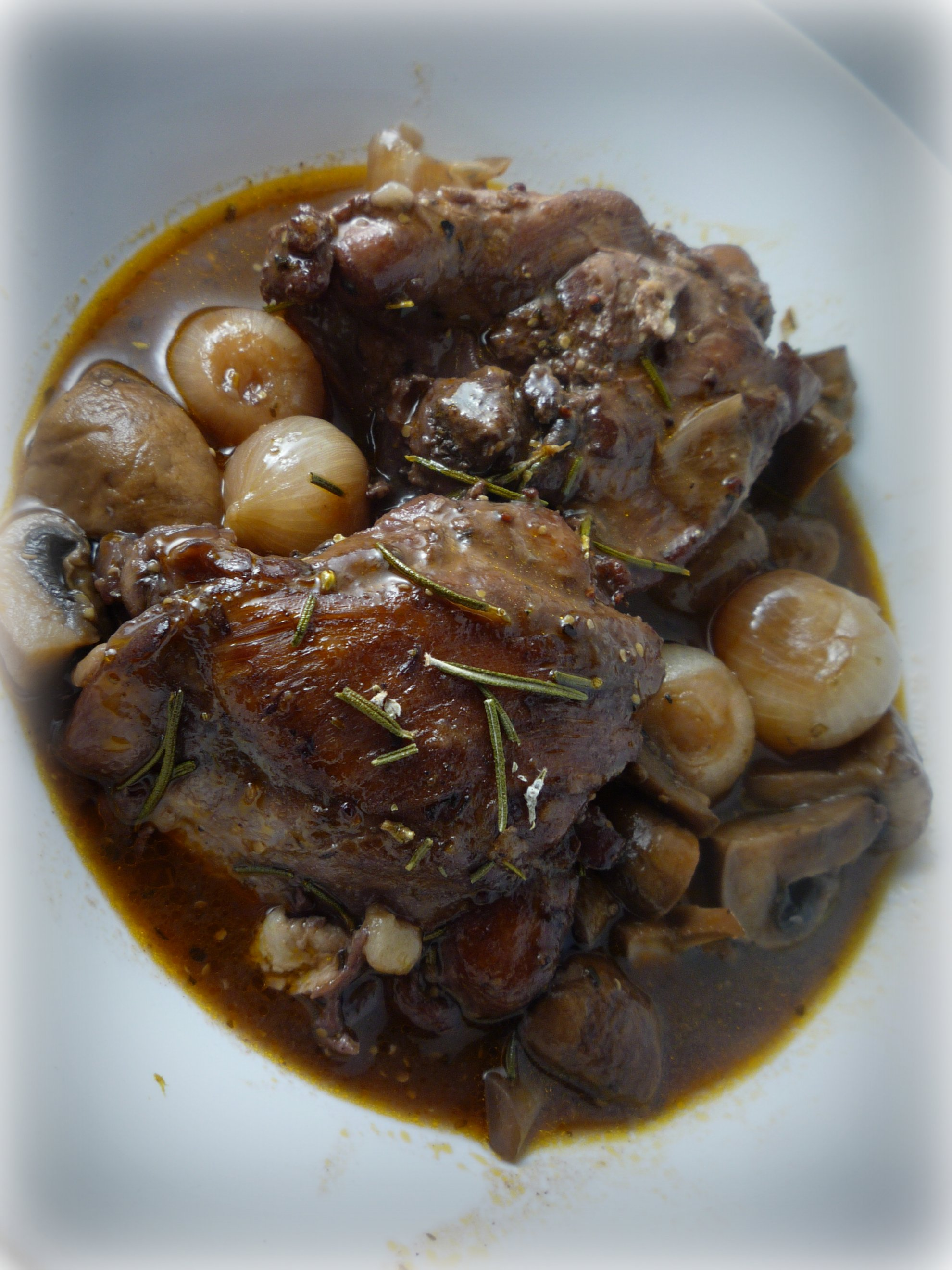
- Type: Braised
- Place of origin: France
- Main ingredients: Chicken, wine, lardons, mushrooms, optionally garlic

Coq au vin (/ˌkɒk oʊ ˈvæ̃/; French: [kɔk o vɛ̃], "rooster/cock with wine") is a French dish of chicken braised with wine, lardons, mushrooms, and optionally garlic. A red Burgundy wine is typically used, though many regions of France make variants using local wines, such as coq au vin jaune (Jura), coq au riesling (Alsace), coq au pourpre or coq au violet (Beaujolais nouveau), and coq au Champagne.

== History ==
Several legends trace coq au vin to ancient Gaul and Julius Caesar, but the recipe was not documented until the early 20th century; it is generally accepted that it existed as a rustic dish long before that. A somewhat similar recipe, poulet au vin blanc, appeared in an 1864 cookbook.

Simone Beck, Louisette Bertholle and Julia Child included coq au vin in their 1961 cookbook Mastering the Art of French Cooking, and Child prepared it twice on the PBS cooking show The French Chef. This exposure helped to increase the visibility and popularity of the dish in the United States, and coq au vin was seen as one of Child's signature dishes.

== Preparation ==
Although the word coq in French means "rooster" or "cock", and tough birds like mature roosters with much connective tissue benefit from braising, coq au vin may be made with any poultry, most commonly chicken.

Standard recipes require red wine (often Burgundy) for braising, lardons, button mushrooms, onions, often garlic, and sometimes brandy. Recipes with vin jaune may specify morels instead of white mushrooms. The preparation is similar in many respects to beef bourguignon. The chicken is seasoned, sometimes floured, seared in fat and slowly simmered in wine until tender. The usual seasonings are salt, pepper, thyme, parsley, and bay leaf, usually in the form of a bouquet garni. The juices are thickened either with a roux or by adding blood at the end.

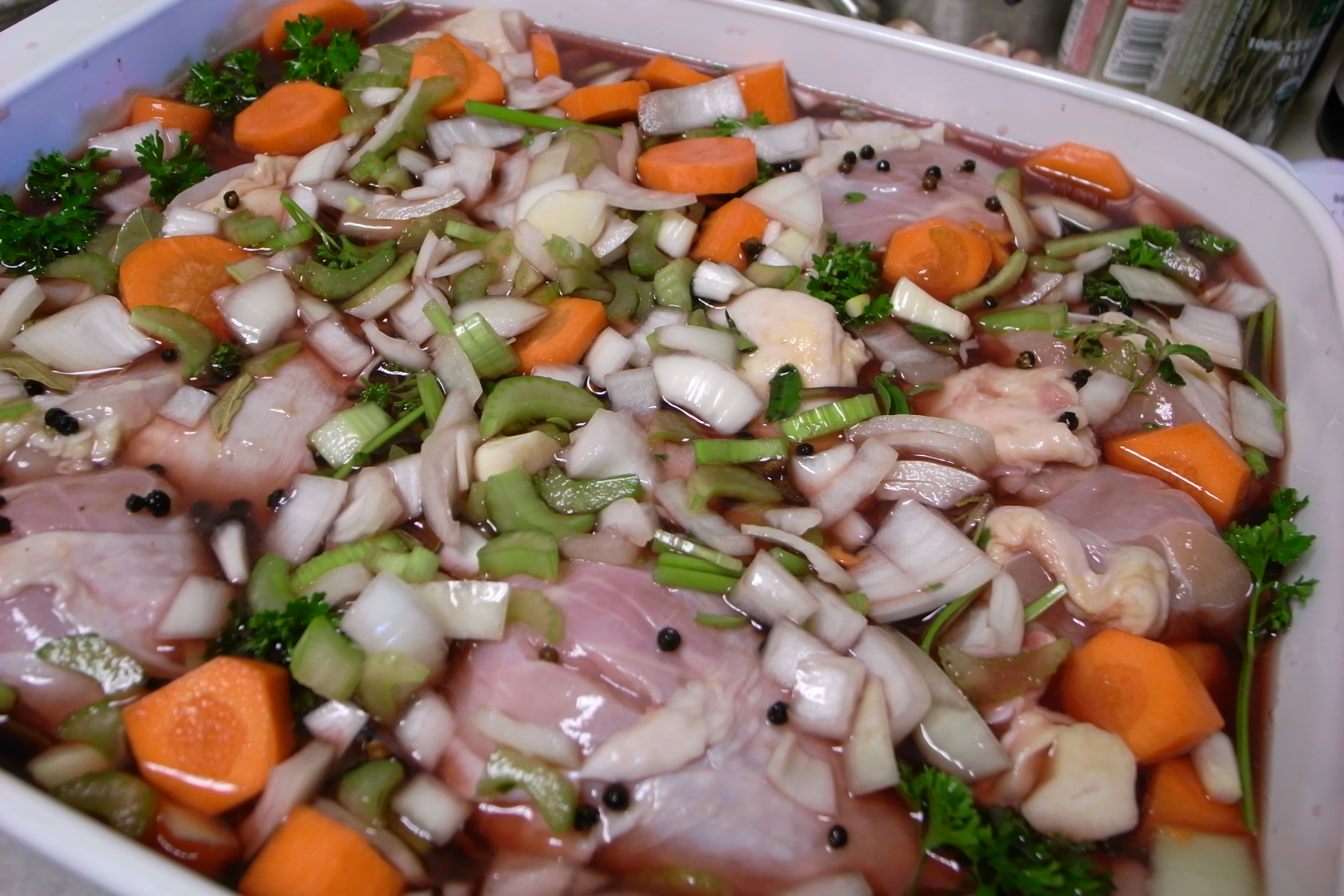
Coq au vin ingredients, before cooking

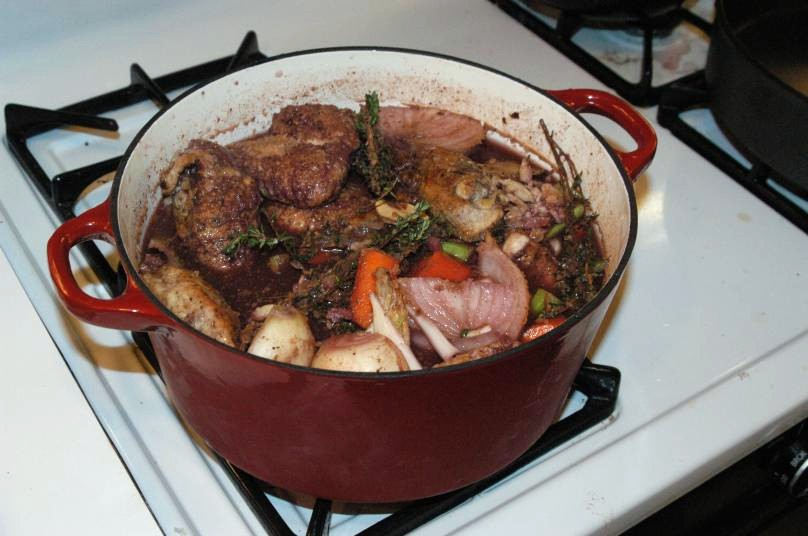
Ingredients, before braising

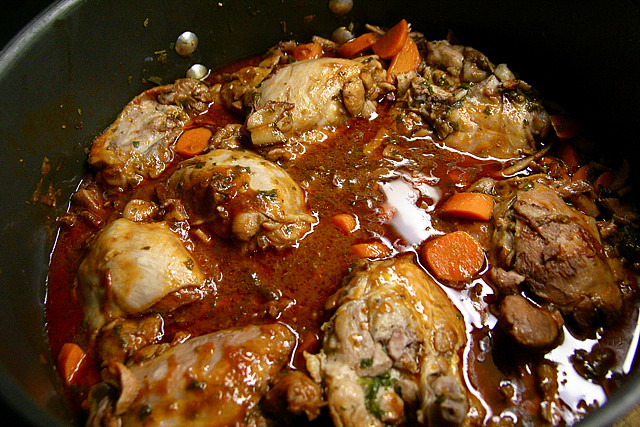
Coq au vin cooking

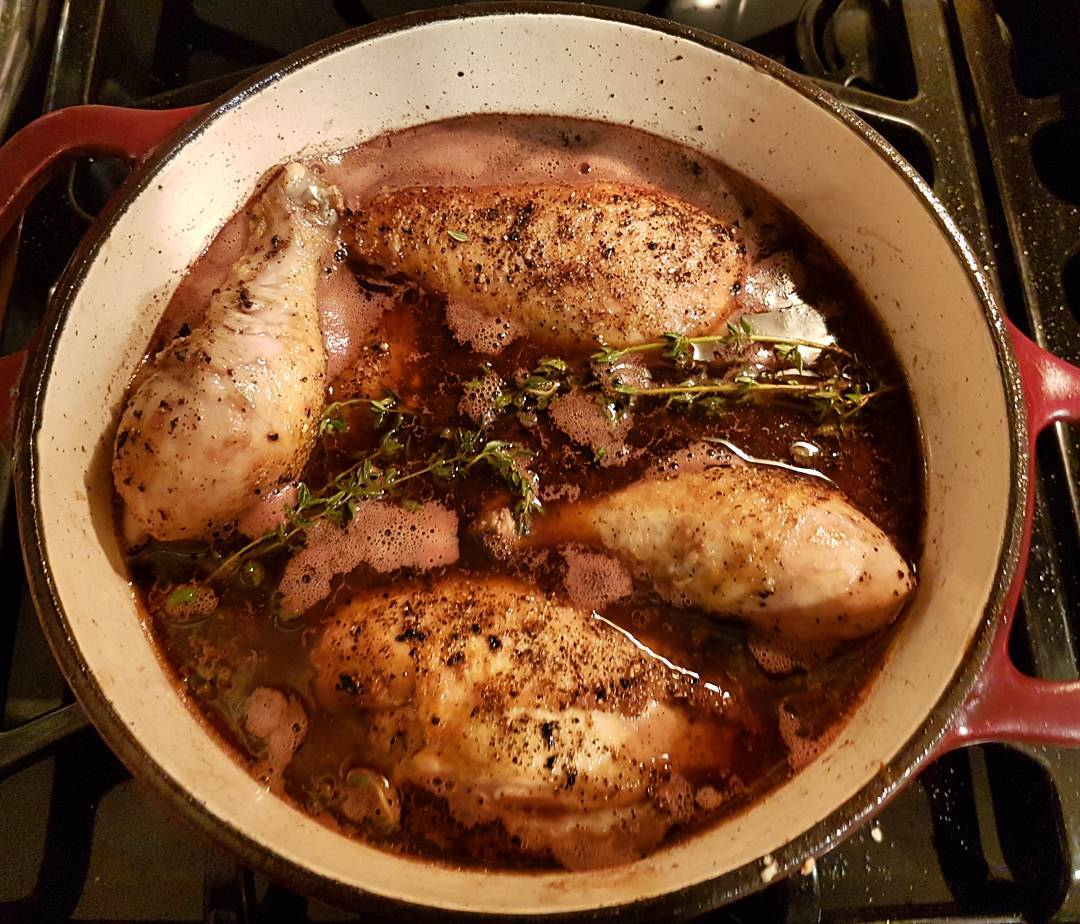
Coq au vin simmering

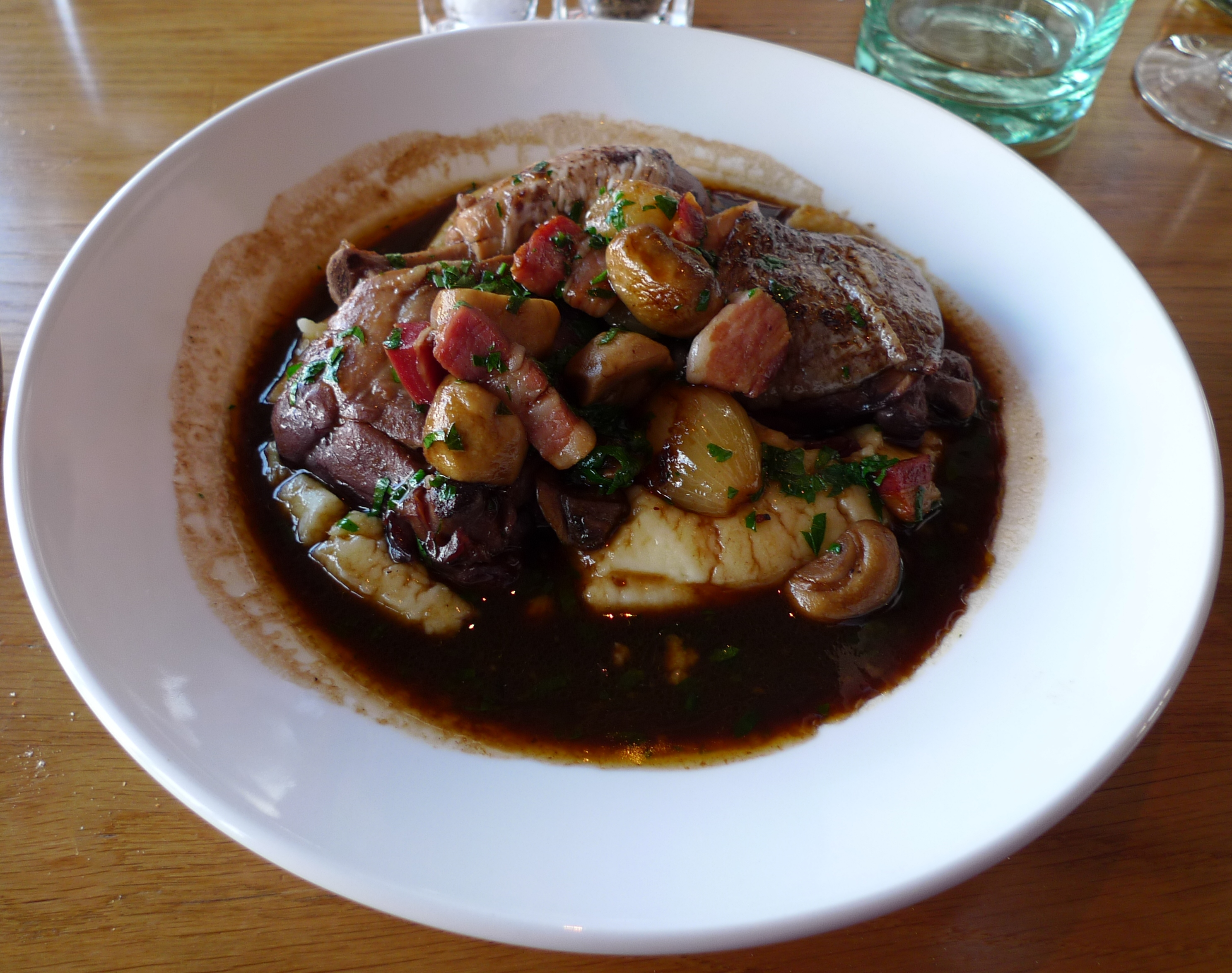
Coq au vin de Bourgogne

== See also ==
- Cooking with wine
- Fricassee
- Fujian red wine chicken
- List of chicken dishes
- List of stews
- Wine sauce
