= Chicken chasseur =

French chicken dish

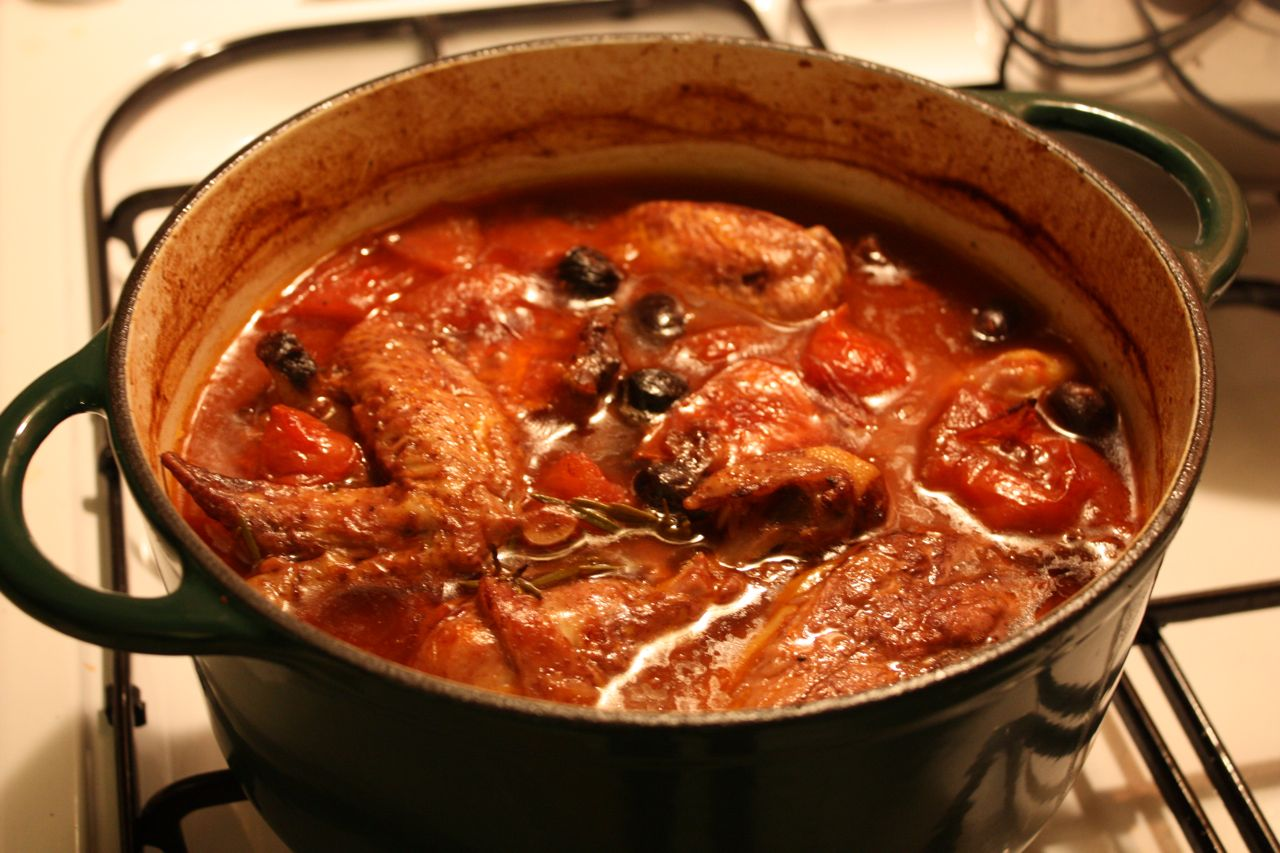
- Alternative names: Poulet chasseur, poulet à la chasseur, poulet sauté chasseur
- Place of origin: France
- Main ingredients: Chicken, mushrooms, tomatoes, onions or shallots, wine

Chicken chasseur (lit. 'hunter's chicken', but unrelated to the British dish of that name) is a French dish, known in France as poulet chasseur, poulet à la chasseur or poulet sauté chasseur. It consists of fried chicken served hot, with sauce chasseur, which is based on mushrooms, onions or shallots, tomatoes and wine, and may also contain stock and various herbs.

== Etymology ==
Chasseur is the French for 'hunter', and sauce chasseur shares a multilingual connection with other cuisines. In The Oxford Companion to Food, Alan Davidson writes that the phrase, meaning 'huntsmen-style', occurs in many languages: "Italians say alla cacciatora, Poles say bigos and the French chasseur." The term, according to Davidson, usually indicates the presence of forest mushrooms. The Dictionnaire de l'Académie française dates the term chasseur to the 12th century; the dictionary refers to its culinary use, but does not give any indication of when it was first used in that context. The earliest citation of the culinary use of the word in English given by the Oxford English Dictionary dates from the 1880s.

== History ==
In 1865 Bailey's Magazine recorded a dish of poulet à la chasseur served in a Parisian restaurant and costing the equivalent of half a guinea a head. In Le Figaro in 1870 Eugène Morand recorded a lunch eaten by a group of army officers at which—after two types of sausage, York and Bayonne ham, fried eggs, fillet steak, and macaroni with Parmesan—they concluded the savoury part of the meal with poulet à la chasseur ("Ah! quel plaisir d'être soldat!" (lit. 'Ah! What a pleasure to be a soldier'), commented Morand). The dish is mentioned in the American and British press during the later years of the 19th century.

== Ingredients ==
Chicken chasseur is prepared using sautéed chicken, served with a chasseur sauce. All the following writers specify chopped or sliced mushrooms, and shallots or other types of onion, but vary as to the other ingredients of the sauce. Most recipes call for the addition of herbs: the most frequently specified are parsley and tarragon; others are basil, bay leaf, chervil, and thyme.

Writer	Onions	Tomatoes	Herbs	Alcohol	Stock	Other	Ref
Beck, Bertholle and Child	Shallots or green onions	Fresh tomatoes	Basil, parsley or tarragon	White wine or dry vermouth	Brown stock	Garlic	
Paul Bocuse	Shallots	Fresh tomatoes	Bay leaf, tarragon, thyme, parsley	White wine	–	Celery leaves, garlic	
La Mère Brazier	Shallots	Tomato purée	Chervil, parsley, tarragon	White wine	–	–	
Robert Carrier	Onions	Fresh tomatoes	Tarragon and thyme	Dry white wine and brandy	Chicken stock	–	
Louis Diat	Shallots	Tomato sauce	Parsley and tarragon	Dry white wine	Brown stock	–	
Auguste Escoffier	Shallots	Tomato sauce	Parsley	Cognac and white wine	Demi-glace	–	
Jane Grigson	Shallots	Tomato sauce	Chervil, parsley and tarragon	Dry white wine	Brown stock	–	
Prosper Montagné	Shallot	Tomato sauce	Chervil, parsley and tarragon	White wine and brandy	Veal stock	–	
Édouard de Pomiane	Small onions	–	–	White wine	–	Bacon	
Stéphane Reynaud	Shallots	Fresh tomatoes	Bouquet garni, parsley, tarragon	White wine	–	Potatoes	
Madame Saint-Ange	Shallots	Tomato paste	Chervil, parsley and tarragon	White wine	Beef stock	–	
Louis Saulnier	Shallots	Fresh tomatoes	Parsley	White wine and brandy	Demi-glace	–	
Anne Willan	Shallots	Tomato sauce or tomato paste	Parsley or tarragon	White wine	Brown stock	–	

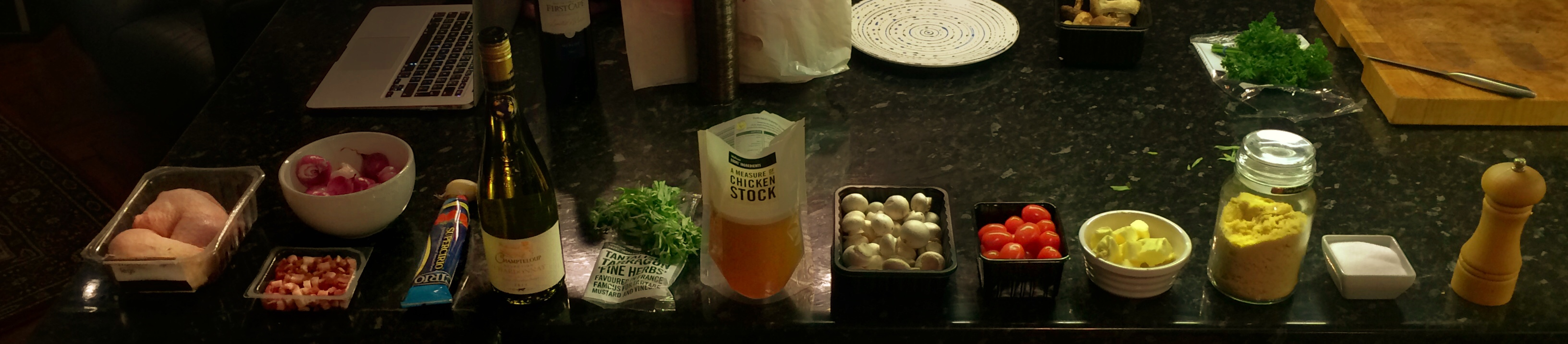
Typical ingredients for chicken chasseur

== Hunter's chicken ==
A dish with the English name "hunter's chicken" exists, but is unrelated to chicken chasseur. It consists of skinless and boneless chicken breasts wrapped in bacon, baked, and covered with barbecue sauce and melted cheese.

== See also ==
- Cacciatore, an Italian dish
- List of chicken dishes

== Sources ==
- Beck, Simone; Louisette Bertholle; Julia Child (2012) [1961]. Mastering the Art of French Cooking, Volume One. London: Particular. ISBN 978-0-241-95339-6.
- Bocuse, Paul (1987). Bocuse à la Carte. New York: Pantheon Books. ISBN 978-0-39-456267-4.
- Brazier, Eugénie; Roger Moreau; Paul Bocuse; Bernard Pacaud (2015) [2004]. La Mère Brazier: The Mother of Modern French Cooking. London: Modern Books. ISBN 978-1-906761-84-4.
- Carrier, Robert (1973). Cooking for You. London: Hamlyn. ISBN 978-0-60-037541-8.
- Davidson, Alan (1999). The Oxford Companion to Food. Oxford: Oxford University Press. ISBN 978-0-19-211579-9.
- Diat, Louis (1946). French Cooking for Americans. Philadelphia: J. B. Lippincott. OCLC 1036371103.
- Escoffier, Auguste (1907). A Guide to Modern Cookery. London: Heinemann. OCLC 560604921.
- Grigson, Jane (1975). The Mushroom Feast. London: Michael Joseph. ISBN 978-0-71-811253-0.
- Montagné, Prosper (1976). Larousse gastronomique. London: Hamlyn. OCLC 1285641881.
- Pomiane, Édouard de (1938). 365 menus, 365 recettes. Paris: Albin Michel. OCLC 459599806.
- Saint-Ange, E. (2005) [1927]. La bonne cuisine de Madame E. Saint-Ange (in French). Berkeley: Ten Speed Press. ISBN 9781580086059. OCLC 1285661274.
- Saulnier, Louis (1978) [1923]. Le répertoire de la cuisine (fourteenth ed.). London: Jaeggi. OCLC 1086737491.
- Willan, Anne (1991). Cuisine succès: L'école de la cuisine (in French). Paris: Larousse. ISBN 978-2-03-506008-2.
