= Julia's Kitchen Wisdom =

2000 cookbook by Julia Child and David Nussbaum

- Cover shot
- Author: Julia Child, David Nussbaum
- Language: English
- Subject: Culinary Arts
- Genre: Non-fiction
- Publisher: Alfred A. Knopf
- Publication date: 2000
- Publication place: United States
- Media type: Book
- Pages: 135
- ISBN: 0-375-41151-8
- OCLC: 44794913
- Dewey Decimal: 641.5 21
- LC Class: TX651 .C523 2000
- Preceded by: Julia and Jacques Cooking at Home

Julia's Kitchen Wisdom (Knopf, 2000) is the final cookbook authored by chef and television personality Julia Child. Co-authored by David Nussbaum and edited by Judith Jones, the book covers basic cooking principles and techniques and was designed to serve as a reference point for amateur cooks. Julia's Kitchen Wisdom was the 17th book written by Child and gained widespread popularity following the release of the 2009 film, 'Julie and Julia'.

== Description ==
As the final book in Child's oeuvre, ‘Julia’s Kitchen Wisdom’ is a compilation of her previous 16 cookbooks, forming a “loose-leaf kitchen reference guide”. It is intended for use by home-cooks to answer cooking questions and solve common cooking problems, such as how long to cook a particular cut of meat, the most suitable accompaniments to serve with a certain dish, or different methods used to cook an ingredient. In the book's introduction, Child suggests that the book is written for an audience relatively familiar with the language, techniques and equipment involved in home cooking. Child collaborated on the book with media executive and CEO of America’s Test Kitchen David Nussbaum, who helped Child gather and collate material from her extensive body of work, including previous cookbooks and television shows.‘Julia’s Kitchen Wisdom’ followed a television special by the same name, which aired in 2000.

== Inspiration ==
Child's education at Le Cordon Bleu cooking school in France under the tutelage of chef Max Bugnard was influential in developing Child's affinity with French cuisine. Her training and collaboration with friends Simone Beck and Louisette Betholle, whom she founded ‘L’Ecole Des Trois Gourmandes’ (The School of the Three Hearty Eaters) with in 1951, can be credited with teaching Child many of the techniques and recipes she shares in ‘Julia’s Kitchen Wisdom’. Child's first and only editor, Judith Jones, credits the increased interest of the American public in French culture and cuisine in the 1960s and 1970s to the success of Child's books. An appreciation of French cooking and the widespread popularity of Julia Child may have inspired the publishing of ‘Julia’s Kitchen Wisdom’.

As the final book authored by Child, ‘Julia’s Kitchen Wisdom’ collates the tips and instructions offered in her previous books in a succinct and simplistic manner. It was inspired by the “trials, remedies, and errors” recorded in Child's own notebook and is designed to serve as a useful reference for home-cooks. Child's earlier books, ‘Mastering the Art of French Cooking: Volume I and II’ and ‘The Way to Cook’ were devised as comprehensive guides that offered highly detailed instruction on techniques, cooking methods, and numerous recipes to educate readers on the fundamentals of French cuisine. According to Child, these books were geared towards “an intelligent, reasonably sophisticated audience which likes good food and cooking”. ‘Julia’s Kitchen Wisdom’ is Child's most accessible book, distilling the information offered in her previous works into short explanations, methods of problem solving, and master recipes to guide readers. ‘Julia’s Kitchen Wisdom’ was inspired by a two-hour television special of the same name which aired in 2000 on PBS.

== Structure ==
Unlike her previous, more thorough cookbooks, ‘Julia’s Kitchen Wisdom’ is structured in a simplistic manner, designed as an easy-to-follow reference guide. It is one of Child’s shortest cookbooks. The book has a particular focus on basic cooking techniques and contains an array of master recipes to guide home-cooks. The book is divided into categories such as ‘Soups and Two Mother Sauces’, ‘Salads and Their Dressings’, ‘Meats, Poultry and Fish’, and so on. Within each main category, there is a master recipe, four to five variations of the master recipe, relevant techniques, and useful tips. The book also contains an extensive index, approximately 20 pages long, where ingredients and their corresponding recipes are alphabetised. The index allows readers to look up a specific ingredient or technique to find answers to common questions relatively quickly. The book is considered popular as it covers many facets of home-cooking in a straightforward manner, despite its relatively brief nature.

== Writing ==
For her final cookbook, Child collaborated on ‘Julia’s Kitchen Wisdom’ with journalist, media executive and Chief Executive Officer of independent media company America's Test Kitchen, David Nussbaum. Child and Nussbaum previously collaborated on Child’s second-to-last published cookbook, ‘Julia and Jacques Cooking at Home’, where Nussbaum worked as the book’s writer. He assisted by drafting recipes and recording commentary between Julia Child and chef, television personality and author, Jacques Pepin. Nussbaum contributed to the creation of ‘Julia’s Kitchen Wisdom’ by compiling content from Child’s previous works. As the book consists of a number of simplified recipes from Child’s former, more comprehensive books, such as ‘Mastering the Art of French Cooking’, and Child's own notes, tips and findings from her culinary experience, Nussbaum was responsible for amassing and collating potential content for the book. According to Child, Nussbaum assisted her by offering “outlines and suggestions” for the cookbook. Child credits Nussbaum with ensuring ‘Julia’s Kitchen Wisdom’ was published by its deadline.

In the book's ‘Acknowledgments’ section, Child also makes mention of her editor, Judith Jones, who edited all of Child's cookbooks. Jones has been credited with introducing American audiences to Julia Child with the publishing of Child's first cookbook, ‘Mastering the Art of French Cooking’ in 1961.

== Television special ==
Following the release of Child’s first cookbook ‘Mastering the Art of French Cooking’ in 1961, educational television station WGBH in the United States (now known as PBS) offered her a television series entitled ‘The French Chef’, where she demonstrated how to cook French recipes in half-hour episodes. Child went on to host numerous other television shows inspired by her popular cookbooks. Some of these included ‘Julia Child and Company’ (1978–79), ‘Baking with Julia’ (1996–98), and the two-hour special ‘Julia’s Kitchen Wisdom’' which inspired the book.

The television special, ‘Julia’s Kitchen Wisdom’, aired in 2000 and was a two-hour compilation of videos from Child’s earlier television shows and specials. In between snippets of Child demonstrating recipes, there are brief clips of her peers discussing the impact Child’s work – both her books and television shows – have had on their own careers. The special is seen as more of a tribute to Child and her enduring legacy as opposed to an instructional cooking show. Like the book, the show is organised by categories, such as ‘Vegetables’ and ‘Eggs’ and incorporates information on techniques and tips from Child. The accompanying book is designed to be more instructional than the show itself.

== Response ==
'Julia's Kitchen Wisdom’ garnered positive responses globally and gained increased popularity following the release of the film ‘Julie and Julia’ in 2009. It was well received in the food community, given its simple and easy-to-follow structure. It was also popular as it differed from traditional cookbooks, like Child's previous works, that only offer recipes consisting of an ingredient list and method. ‘Julia’s Kitchen Wisdom’ instead offers recipes along with explanations of technique, advice on what utensils and equipment to use, recipe variations and tips to solve common cooking problems. The book's accessible nature and characterisation as a ‘basic’ cookbook suited for home-cooks contributed to the book's success and endurance as a timeless kitchen reference guide. The popularity of Julia Child as a chef, home-cook and television personality also contributed to the book's success. At the time of publishing, Child was renowned both within and beyond the food industry and was lauded for her ability to encourage amateur cooks to attempt complex meals and techniques.

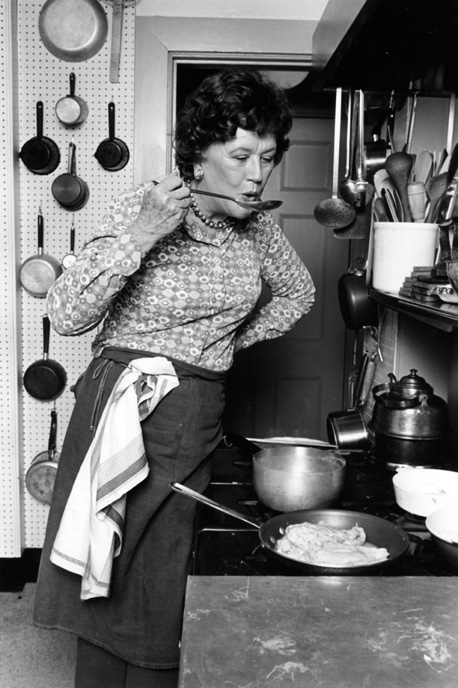
Julia Child, 1978

== Impact ==
The release of Nora Ephron’s 2009 film, ‘Julie and Julia’ led to a resurgence in interest in Child’s works. The film tells the true stories of Julia Child and Julie Powell, a woman who attempts to cook all 524 recipes from ‘Mastering the Art of French Cooking’ in one year. Following the film’s release, ‘Julia’s Kitchen Wisdom’, was propelled to number one on New York Times paperback Advice, How-To and Miscellaneous list. The success of ‘Julia’s Kitchen Wisdom’ five years after her death highlights the enduring popularity of Child’s final book amongst home-cooks and speaks to the lasting impacts of Child’s own legacy. Julia Child is remembered as a teacher, role model and mentor within the food industry. Her first television series ‘The French Chef’, which aired in 1963, has been credited with redefining discourse surrounding ‘gourmet dining’ by introducing French cuisine to American home cooks.

== See also ==
- Cuisine
- Culinary art
- Dish (food)
- Food photography
- Food preparation
- Food writing
- Gourmet Museum and Library
- Haute cuisine
- List of nutrition guides
- Outline of food preparation
- Recipe
