= Avis DeVoto =

American culinary editor, book reviewer, and cook

- Born: Helen Avis MacVicar; May 22, 1904; Houghton, Michigan
- Died: March 7, 1989 (aged 84)
- Occupation: Editor
- Spouse: Bernard DeVoto (m. 1923; died 1955)
- Children: 2
- Writing career
- Genre: Culinary

Helen Avis DeVoto (May 22, 1904 – March 7, 1989) was an American culinary editor, book reviewer, and cook. She was highly influential in editing and guiding two famous cookbooks to publication: Julia Child's Mastering the Art of French Cooking and the US edition of the British food writer Elizabeth David's Italian Food.

== Biography ==
Helen Avis MacVicar was born in Houghton, Michigan, on May 22, 1904. She attended Northwestern University and at the end of her freshman year in 1923, she married American historian Bernard DeVoto, who had been her English instructor. The DeVotos remained in Evanston for four years and then moved to Cambridge, Massachusetts, where Bernard taught English at Harvard University until 1936. During these early years, DeVoto became acquainted with many literary icons - close friends of Bernard's - including Robert Frost and publishing executive Lovell Thompson. The DeVotos lived in Cambridge for the majority of their lives together.

In addition to being an accomplished cook and book reviewer, Avis DeVoto worked for many years as Bernard's secretary, handling his correspondence and editing his writing. In 1952, DeVoto received a letter from Julia Child, at that time living in Paris, responding to one of Bernard's recent magazine columns on how much he detested stainless steel knives; Child thought he was “100% right”. DeVoto's reply to the letter initiated the correspondence and lifelong friendship between the two women. DeVoto and Child would not meet in person until 1954, but during those first two years they exchanged around 120 letters, which were eventually compiled into a book, As Always, Julia (2010).

DeVoto served as an early reader and editor for Child's forthcoming cookbook, Mastering the Art of French Cooking, and her editorial connections would help Child and her co-authors Louisette Bertholle and Simone Beck sign a contract with Houghton Mifflin in 1954. When the publishing company rejected the book, DeVoto helped push for the book's publication by Alfred A. Knopf.

After Bernard DeVoto's sudden death in 1955, Avis DeVoto worked as a cookbook scout and editor for Knopf from 1956–1958. She later became House Secretary for Lowell House at Harvard from 1958 to 1963 and worked in the Deans’ Office at Radcliffe College until her retirement in 1969. During this time she also continued to edit and read manuscripts for Houghton Mifflin.

== Personal life and death ==
Avis and Bernard DeVoto had two sons: Mark (b. 1940) is a music theorist, composer, and retired professor at Tufts University. Their older son Gordon, a writer, died in 2009. Avis died of pancreatic cancer in 1989.

== Portrayals ==
- Actress Deborah Rush played DeVoto in the film Julie & Julia, which starred Meryl Streep as Julia Child and Amy Adams as Julie Powell.
- Bebe Neuwirth plays her in the 2022 HBO Max series Julia, which starred Sarah Lancashire as Julia Child.
