= Pork chop =

Type of meat cut

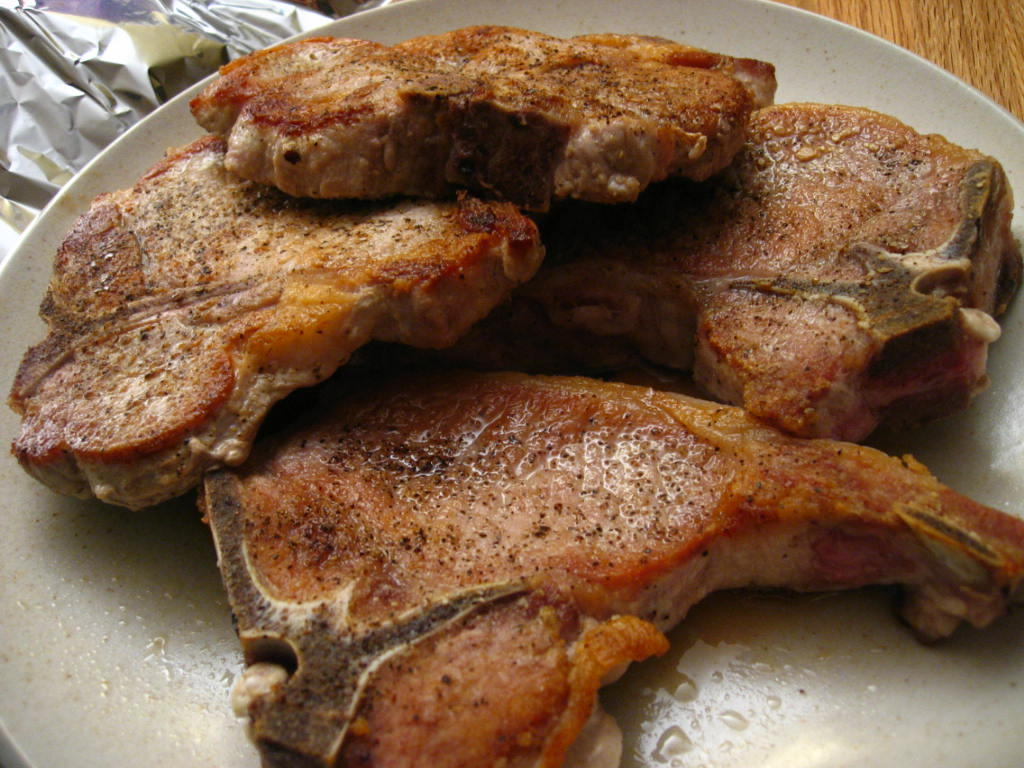
Cooked pork chops

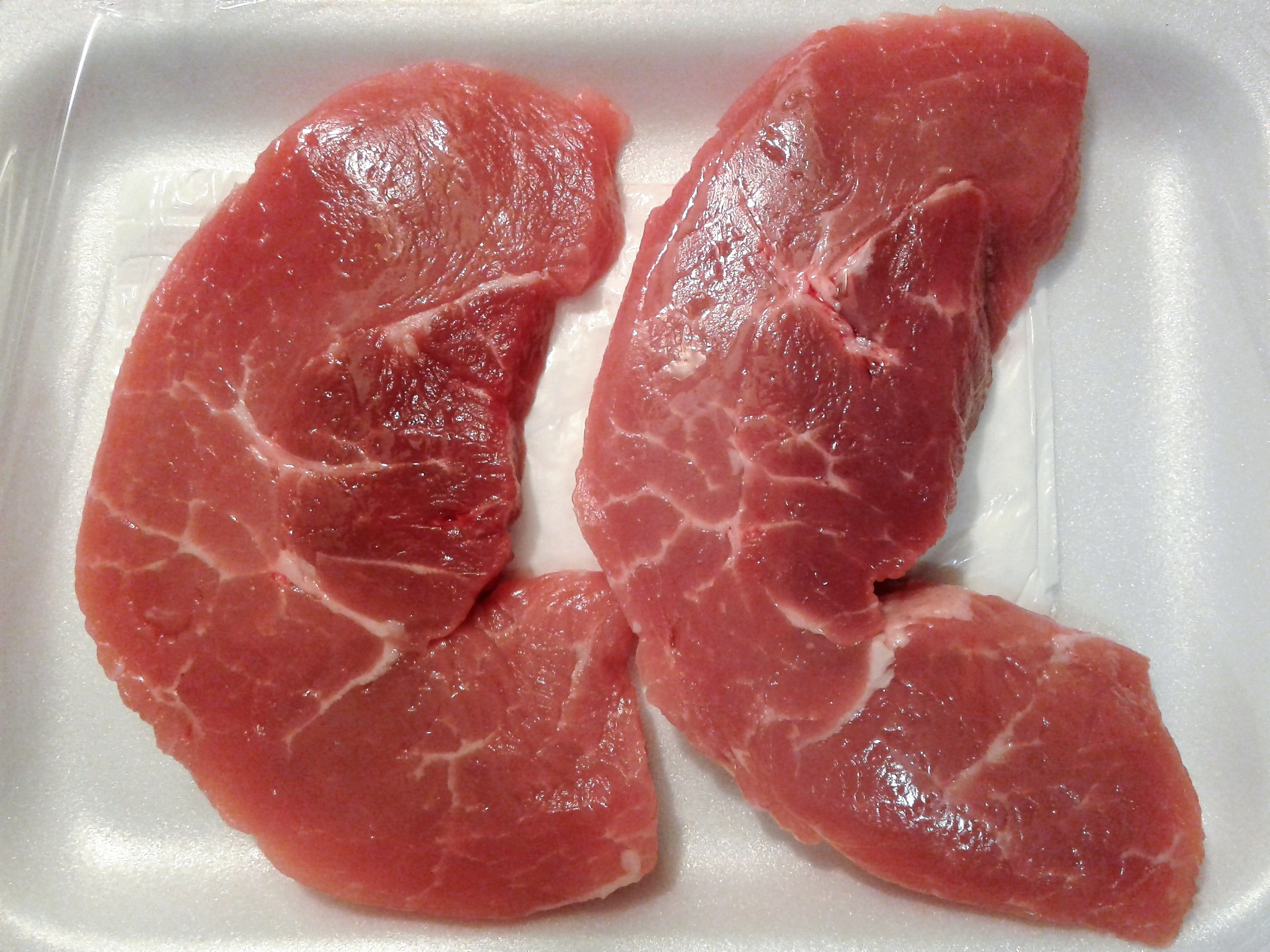
Raw pork chops

A pork chop is a thick slice of meat cut from the domestic pig, particularly one adjacent to a rib and usually served with it. It may be cooked in many ways, the simplest being fried or grilled, plain or coated with flour and dipped in egg and breadcrumbs. Numerous combinations of vegetables, fruits, spices and herbs are cooked with pork chops in the cuisines of many countries, including Austria, Britain, China, France, Germany, Italy, Spain and the US.

Although pork was favoured in classical and medieval times it was not until the nineteenth century that pork chops became popular. Modern breeding techniques mean that it is no longer necessary on food hygiene grounds to cook pork, including chops, for as long as used to be recommended, with the result that a juicier result can be obtained.

== Definition and history ==
The Oxford English Dictionary (OED) defines a pork chop as "A thick slice of pork, esp. one adjacent to a rib and usually served with it".. The first use of the term cited in the OED dates from c. 1752, but the cut has been familiar for considerably longer: the Dictionnaire de l'Académie Française dates the French term for it, Côtelette de porc, back to the fourteenth century. In her 1954 Food in England, Dorothy Hartley wrote of the Anglo-Saxons enjoying a grilled pork chop with apple sauce and ale, but although pork was a favoured meat in classical and mediaeval times it was not until the nineteenth century that pork chops became widely popular. Hanna Glasse (1747) makes no mention of pork chops in The Art of Cookery Made Plain and Easy, but Mrs Beeton (1861) gives two recipes for pork chops in Beeton's Book of Household Management.

Old cookery books insist that pork must be thoroughly cooked, erring if at all on the overcooked rather than the undercooked side. Modern breeding techniques have made it possible to cook pork, including chops, to a lower temperature, helping the meat to remain juicy while still being safe to eat. Pork chops are sometimes sold marinated, or they can be marinated at home. In their Mastering the Art of French Cooking, Simone Beck, Louisette Bertholle and Julia Child suggest marinating pork chops in brine, lemon juice or wine.

== International variations ==
=== Austria and Germany ===
Among Austrian ways of serving pork chops is Schweinkotelett auf Sauerkraut – braised with sauerkraut. Jägerschnitzel, familiar in Austrian and German cuisines is made of pork chops, deboned, beaten thin, breadcrumbed and shallow fried, served with a mushroom gravy. German dishes using pork chops include Schweinkotelett in Senfsosse – cooked with mustard in white wine, and Paprika Schweinkotelett – cooked with paprika, Speck, peppers and sour cream.

=== Britain ===
The traditional British way with pork chops is to trim them of superfluous fat, brush with lard, dredge in flour and grill quickly; they are served with hot apple sauce, brown gravy and boiled potatoes. Gordon Ramsay suggests pork chops fried and served with fried sage leaves and champ. Alternative British methods of cooking pork chops include braising with honey and cranberries or cherries, and casseroling with lemon peel, sherry or Madeira, sultanas and apple.

=== China ===
A Chinese way of cooking pork chops is marinating them in oyster and soy sauces and then frying with white and red onion, ginger, garlic and wine. The meat of a pork chop is sometimes sliced whole from the bone and beaten thin, resembling an escalope, before being marinated in wine and soy sauce and then fried.

=== France ===
The pork chop plays a prominent part in French cuisine. Among the ways of serving it are:

| French | English | Contents | Ref |
|---|---|---|---|
| À la berlinoise | Berlin style | Dipped in egg and breadcrumbs, fried; mashed potatoes and braised red cabbage with sliced apples served separately. | |
| À la choucroute | With sauerkraut | Browned in lard, placed in baking dish with pre-braised sauerkraut, covered with raw apple slices, moistened with white wine and a little beef stock, braised in oven. | |
| À la charcutière | Butcher style | Not trimmed, lightly flattened, dipped in melted butter and breadcrumbs, grilled; mashed potatoes and butcher sauce served separately. | |
| À la courlandaise | Courland style | Dipped in melted butter and breadcrumbs, grilled; served with red cabbage, glaced chestnuts and Madeira sauce. | |
| À la crème aigre | In sour cream sauce | Seasoned, coated with flour, fried in butter; deglazed with sour cream and a little meat glaze, seasoned with lemon and poured over cutlet; boiled potatoes served separately. | |
| À la Debreczin | Debrecen style | Browned on both sides, wrapped in blanched cabbage leaf, tied, braised in light paprika sauce; boiled potatoes served separately. | |
| Eszterházy | Esterházy | Browned, seasoned with paprika, simmered in sour cream with strips of root vegetables. | |
| Aux fines herbes | With fine herbs | Browned, braised in brown stock with chopped shallots, mushrooms and parsley. | |
| À la flamande | Flanders style | Browned in butter, put in baking dish garnished with peeled and coarsely sliced apples, cooking finished in oven. | |
| En gelée | In jelly | Loin boiled in lightly salted water; when cold, chops are deboned and placed in aspic. Served cold with fried potatoes. | |
| À la grand'mere | Grandmother style | Chopped, mixed with onions simmered in butter, eggs and butter, seasoned, reformed with the rib bone, wrapped in pig's caul, brushed with butter and grilled; mashed potatoes served separately. | |
| À la hongroise | Hungarian style | Browned in lard, braised in light paprika sauce; served with noodles. | |
| À la mexicaine | Mexican style | Browned in butter, braised in light demi-glace with tomato and strips of red peppers. | |
| À la milanaise | Milanese style | Dipped in egg and breadcrumbs mixed with grated Parmesan, fried in oil; served with macaroni. | |
| À la moldavienne | Moldavian style | Chopped, seasoned, mixed with egg, reformed with the rib bone, fried in butter; covered with fried sliced onions, garnished with grated horseradish; mustard sauce served separately. | |
| À la paysanne | Farmer style | Fried, served with fried sliced onions and pan-fried potatoes. | |
| Piquant ou Robert | With piquant sauce or sauce Robert | Seasoned, coated with flour, fried' in butter and served either with Piquant or Robert sauce and mashed potatoes. | |
| Au pommes fruits | With apples | Seasoned, coated with flour, fried in butter; garnished with peeled apple wedges poached in butter, white wine, lemon juice and a little sugar. | |
| Aux racines | With root vegetables | Browned in butter, placed in baking dish alternately with sliced carrots, onions, turnips and potatoes, seasoned, a little stock added. Braised in oven. | |
| À la soissonnaise | Soissons style | Fried in butter, served with navy beans. | |
| Westmoreland | Westmorland style | Fried in butter, covered with demi-glace with chopped pickles added. | |

=== Italy ===
| Name | Contents | Ref |
|---|---|---|
| Braciole di maiale con cavolo nero | Braised with cavolo nero, fennel seeds and tomato | |
| Braciole di maiale alla Romagnola | Braised in white wine with sage and rosemary | |
| Braciole di maiale in salsa | A Calabrian dish with pickled artichoke, pickled mushroom and tomato | |
| Braciole di maiale all'aceto balsamico | Slowly cooked with white wine and chicken stock, mustard, sage and balsamic vinegar | |
| Braciole di maiale con peperonata | The chops are cooked with anchovy filets, parsley and red, yellow or green peppers | |
| Costolette di maiale all'uva | The chops are cooked with a large quantity of grapes in white wine and chicken stock | |
| Maiale ubriaco | "Drunken pork chops" – sautéed with red wine, fennel seeds, garlic and parsley | |

=== Spain ===
Among Spanish recipes for pork chops are Chuletas de cerdo a la naranja – braised with orange juice and ginger, served with sour cream, Chuletas de cerdo picante – with garlic, oregano, cumin, cloves, coriander seed, cinnamon cooked in red wine vinegar and orange juice, served with a pineapple and lime sauce (Salsa de lima y piña), and Chuletas de cerdo al romero con pimienta – cooked with garlic, rosemary, fennel seeds, chili flakes lemon juice and olive oil.

=== US ===
In his 1972 book James Beard's American Cookery the American chef James Beard gives recipes for pork chops with cream gravy, breaded pork chops, pork chops Creole, chilled pork chops, pork chops with mushrooms, pork chops with onions, pork chop sauerkraut casserole and pork chop and potato scallop.

== Alternative chop cuts ==
Chops vary in size from smaller foreloin chops (or cutlets), through to the middle loin chops, both of which have the bone in. Chump chops are boneless and the biggest of the three. They all come from the loin and can be cooked in the same way. In American butchery rib chops come from the rib portion of the loin, and are similar to rib eye steaks; blade or shoulder chops come from the spine and tend to contain much connective tissue. The sirloin chop is taken from the (rear) leg end and also contains much connective tissue. The shoulder end produces chops that are considerably fattier than the chops taken from the loin end.

The "Iowa Chop" is a large thick middle cut, its name coined in 1976 by the Iowa Pork Producers Association due to the state producing more pork than any other in the US. The middle-cut loin is often over 1 inch (2.5 cm) thick, and likened to a quality cut of beef for its size and tenderness.

== Sources ==
- Bakos, Eva; Albert Kofranek (1973). Central European Cooking. New York: Round the World Books. OCLC 4606233.
- Beck, Simone; Louisette Bertholle; Julia Child (2012) [1961]. Mastering the Art of French Cooking, Volume One. London: Particular. ISBN 978-0-241-95339-6.
- Beeton, Isabella (1861). The Book of Household Management. London: S.O. Beeton. OCLC 1040245021.
- Beard, James (1972). American Cookery. Boston and Toronto: Little, Brown. ISBN 0316085669.
- Bickel, Walter, ed. (1980). Hering's Dictionary of Classical and Modern Cookery (Sixth ed.). London: Virtue. ISBN 3-8057-0232-9.
- Bugialli, Giuliano (1989). The Fine Art of Italian Cooking. New York: Times Books. ISBN 0-8129-1838-X.
- Davidson, Alan (1999). The Oxford Companion to Food. Oxford: Oxford University Press. ISBN 978-0-19-211579-9.
- Diaz, Benny (2008). From a Cook to Professional Chef. Bloomington: Universe. ISBN 9780595483808.
- Fitzgibbon, Theodora (1965). The Art of British Cooking. London: Dent. OCLC 221742649.
- Glasse, Hannah (1747). The Art of Cookery Made Plain and Easy. London: Glasse. OCLC 561397353.
- Hartley, Dorothy (1999) [1954]. Food in England. London: Macdonald and Jane's. ISBN 978-1-8560-5497-3.
- Hess, Susan (2001). Bilingual American Cooking. Potomac: Meta Press. ISBN 0-9714051-2-3.
- Knuth, Christopher; Catherine Knuth (2013). The German Kitchen. Northampton, Massachusetts: Interlink Books. ISBN 9781566569507.
- Logans, Martha (1952). Meat Cookbook. New York: Pocket Books. OCLC 15863994.
- Prion (1998). Traditional Italian Cooking. London: Prion. ISBN 1853752681.
- Ramsay, Gordon (2009). Gordon Ramsay's Great British Pub Food. London: HarperCollins. ISBN 9780007289820.Isbn
- Roupe, Diane (2009). The Blue Ribbon Country Cookbook. Nashville: Thomas Nelson. ISBN 9781418568214.
- Viazzi, Alfredo (1983). Alfredo Viazzi's Italian Cooking. New York: Vintage Books. ISBN 0394717473.
- Villafañe, Zoe M (2005). Sabores para disfrutar la parrilla. Buenos Aires: Ziel. ISBN 9789871184057.
- Wright, Jeni, ed. (1981). The Encyclopedia of Italian Cooking. London: Chancellor Press. ISBN 9781851522453.
