= Consommé =

Type of clear soup

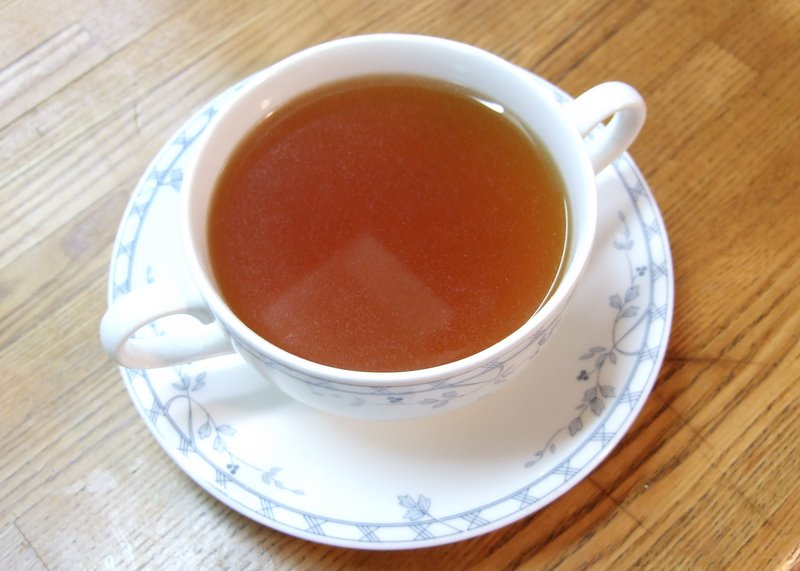
- Poultry consommé
- Type: Soup
- Place of origin: France
- Main ingredients: Stock or bouillon, ground meat, mirepoix (carrots, celery, leek), tomatoes, egg whites

Consommé (French: [kɔ̃sɔme] is a type of clear soup made from richly flavoured stock or broth that has been clarified, a process that traditionally uses egg whites to remove fat and sediment. A later technique for clarification employs gelatin filtration. Consommés are most commonly made from beef or veal, but chicken, fish and game variants are recognised in French cuisine. They may be served on their own – hot or chilled – or be used as the basis of many soups, sauces and stews.

== Etymology and history ==
In French usage the word dates back to the fourteenth century as the past participle of consommer, meaning consumed, accomplished or finished. By the sixteenth century the word was used as a noun meaning a "finished" soup – a concentrated and clarified meat broth as opposed to a simple stock or broth. The first edition of the Dictionnaire de l'Académie française (1694) defines it as "boüillon fort succulent d'une viande extremement cuite" – strong succulent broth of very well-cooked meat. The word is first recorded in English usage in 1815, and in Don Juan (Canto XV, 1824), Lord Byron writes of "The salmi, the consommé, the purée". In French usage each of the three syllables is given approximately equal stress. In Anglophone usage the main stress may be on the first syllable (Canadian and modern British pronunciation), the second (earlier British pronunciation) or the third (American pronunciation); in Australian usage either the first or second syllable may be stressed.

Alexis Soyer published his recipe for consommé in his Gastronomic Regenerator (1846):

Cut up two knuckles of veal and a leg of beef with the bones ... rub a quarter of a pound of butter over the bottom of a large stewpan, into which put the meat, with one pound of lean ham, four onions, four turnips, two middling-sized carrots, six cloves, one blade of mace, and a pint of water. ... let it simmer three hours, skim off all the fat, then pass it through a cloth into a basin. ... Should it require clarifying, ... have the whites of eight eggs with their shells in another stewpan, whisk them half a minute, then whisk the boiling consommé and pour in the whites of eggs, whisking it over a clear fire until it simmers and the eggs separate from the consommé, which will be then quite clear.

Both Soyer and a later French chef, Auguste Escoffier, use consommé for the basis of many soups, sauces and stews as well as for serving on its own. Soyer includes it in more than a hundred of his recipes, from demi-glace to Macaroni à la Napolitaine. Escoffier gives recipes for consommés of chicken, fish and game ("the necks, breasts, and shoulders of venison and of hare, old wild rabbits, old pheasants, and old partridges may be used"). He distinguishes between consommés served at dinners, garnished, in soup plates and those served at suppers: "These, being only served in cups, either hot or cold, do not allow of any garnishing, since they are to be drunk at table. They must therefore be perfect in themselves, delicate, and quite clear".

In Le Répertoire de la cuisine (1914) Louis Saulnier gives recipes for more than a hundred variants of consommé, including bergère (oxtail consommé with asparagus tips, diced mushrooms with tarragon and chervil); Cyrano (beef consommé with duck and Parmesan); ecossaise (mutton consommé with pearl barley); George Sand (fish consommé with crayfish and morels); Mikado (chicken consommé with tomato); parisienne (beef consommé with leeks); Rossini (chicken consommé with truffles and foie gras); and Rothschild (game consommé with Sauternes).

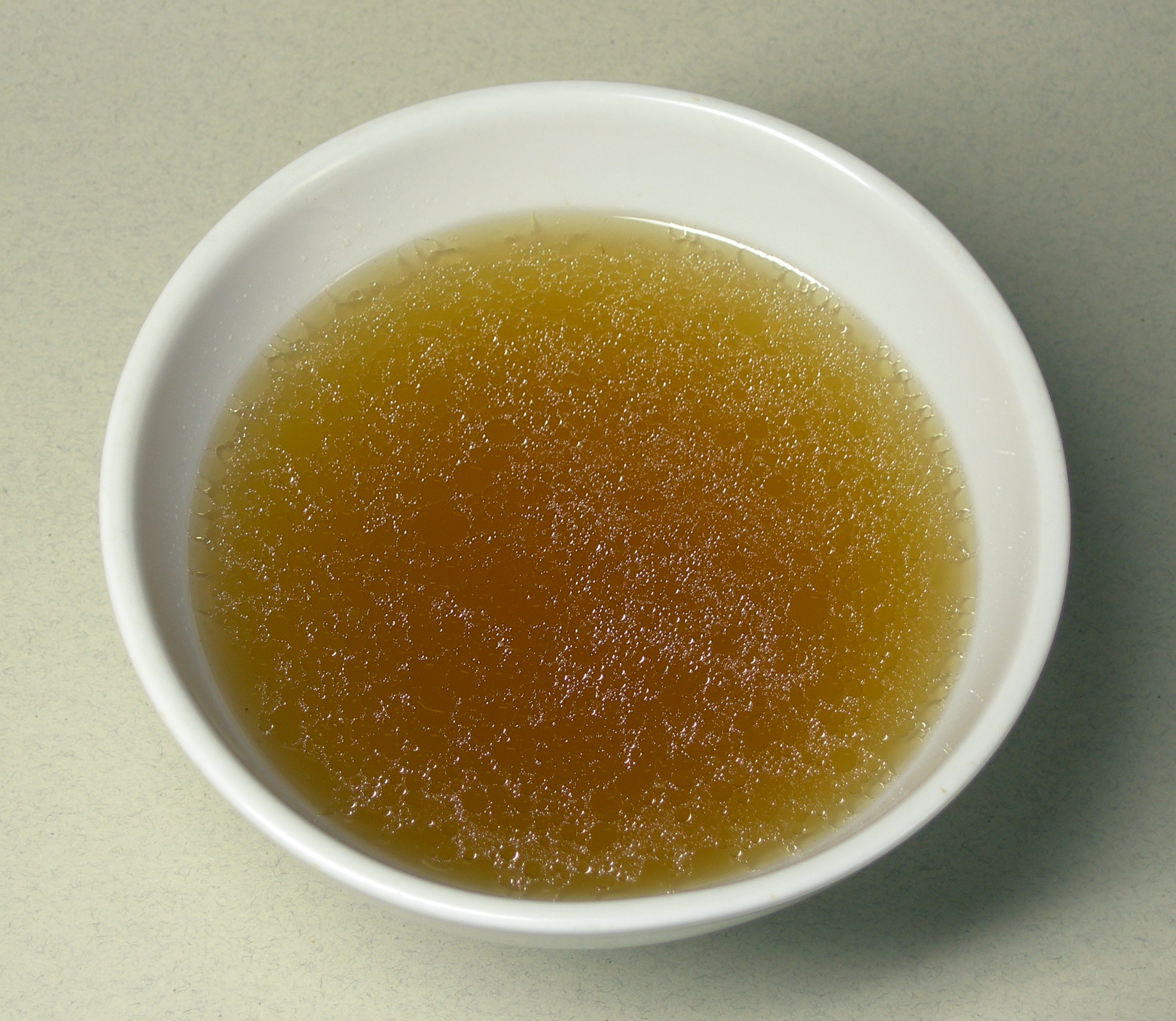
Beef consommé

In their 1961 book Mastering the Art of French Cooking, Simone Beck, Louisette Bertholle and Julia Child say this about clarifying consommé:

This is accomplished by beating egg whites into cold stock, then heating it to just below the simmer for 15 minutes. The egg-white globules dispersed into the stock act as a magnet for all its minute cloudy particles. These gradually rise to the surface, leaving a crystal-clear liquid below them.

== Varieties ==
Double consommé is made to double strength. One method is to double the quantity of meat used in the recipe; another is producing one of normal strength and reducing it to half its volume.

In a 2007 New York Times article Harold McGee set out an alternative method for clarifying broths, originating among chefs of the molecular gastronomy movement: gelatin filtration, relying on some of the properties of a super-saturated solution of gelatin, created by freezing, to remove macroscopic particles that cause cloudiness from a water-based stock. This method is distinct from traditional consommé both in technique and in final product, as gelatin filtration results in a gelatin-free broth, while traditional consommé gives a final product rich in gelatin, with a correspondingly rich mouthfeel. A traditional consommé gels when chilled; a gelatin-filtered consommé does not.

What is advertised as beef consommé is available in cans. A proprietary brand on sale in Britain in 2025 contained water, sherry (3%), beef gelatin, yeast extract, salt, sugar, beef extract (0.2%), onion extract, black pepper extract, parsley extract, sunflower oil, mixed peppers, spice extracts (celery, nutmeg, pimento, cinnamon, capsicum) and niacin. In the US a proprietary brand contained "beef stock (water, dried beef stock), gelatin, yeast extract, salt, sugar, natural flavoring, monosodium glutamate, tamari soy sauce (water, soybeans, salt), caramel color, citric acid, carrots, beef stock, soy sauce (water, soybeans, salt, wheat), onions, celery, beef tallow, dried beef, dried carrots, wheat and soy". Beck, Bertholle and Child state that they do not recommend tinned consommé.

== Sources ==
- Beck, Simone; Louisette Bertholle; Julia Child (2012) [1961]. Mastering the Art of French Cooking, Volume One. London: Particular. ISBN 978-0-241-95339-6.
- Davidson, Alan (1999). The Oxford Companion to Food. Oxford: Oxford University Press. ISBN 978-0-19-211579-9.
- Escoffier, Auguste (1907). A Guide to Modern Cookery. London: William Heinemann Ltd. OCLC 314467749.
- Saulnier, Louis (1978) [1914]. Le répertoire de la cuisine (fourteenth ed.). London: Jaeggi. OCLC 1086737491.
- Soyer, Alexis (1846). The Gastronomic Regenerator: A Simplified and Entirely New System of Cookery. London: Simpkin, Marshall & Co. OCLC 1156372451.

== See also ==
- List of French soups and stews
- List of soups
- Broth
