= Julie & Julia =

2009 film by Nora Ephron

- Theatrical release poster
- Directed by: Nora Ephron
- Screenplay by: Nora Ephron
- Based on: My Life in France by Julia Child Alex Prud'homme; Julie & Julia by Julie Powell
- Produced by: Nora Ephron; Laurence Mark; Eric Steel; Amy Robinson
- Starring: Meryl Streep; Amy Adams; Stanley Tucci; Chris Messina; Linda Emond
- Cinematography: Stephen Goldblatt
- Edited by: Richard Marks
- Music by: Alexandre Desplat
- Production companies: Columbia Pictures; Easy There Tiger Productions; Laurence Mark Productions
- Distributed by: Sony Pictures Releasing
- Release date: August 7, 2009
- Running time: 123 minutes
- Country: United States
- Language: English
- Budget: $40 million
- Box office: $129.5 million

Julie & Julia is a 2009 American biographical comedy drama film written and directed by Nora Ephron starring Meryl Streep and Amy Adams in the title roles with Stanley Tucci, Chris Messina, and Linda Emond in supporting roles. The film contrasts the life of chef Julia Child (played by Streep) in the early years of her culinary career with the life of young New Yorker Julie Powell (played by Adams), who aspires to cook all 524 recipes in Child's cookbook in 365 days, a challenge she described on her popular blog, which made her a published author.

Ephron's screenplay is based on two books: My Life in France, Child's autobiography written with Alex Prud'homme, and a memoir by Powell, Julie & Julia: 365 Days, 524 Recipes, 1 Tiny Apartment Kitchen (later retitled Julie & Julia: My Year of Cooking Dangerously). Both of these books were written and published between 2004 and 2006. Powell's book was based on her blog The Julie/Julia Project, where she documented online her daily experiences cooking each of the 524 recipes in Child's 1961 cookbook Mastering the Art of French Cooking. The film is the first major motion picture based on a blog.

In March 2008, Ephron began filming with Streep as Child and Adams as Powell. On July 30, 2009, the film officially premiered at the Ziegfeld Theatre in New York; and, on August 7, 2009, it opened throughout North America. It received positive reviews from critics, who praised Streep's performance.

Julie & Julia was Ephron's last film before her death in 2012.

== Plot ==
The film is presented in a series of flashbacks between the present and the past, jumping between various moments in both Julie and Julia's lives. The following plot summary separates the plot based on character.

=== Julia Child – 1950s ===
In the 1950s, Julia Child, an enthusiastic and unabashed woman, moves to Paris with her diplomat husband, Paul Child. She attends Le Cordon Bleu to learn French cooking and is initially met with skepticism as she is the only woman in the class. Madame Elizabeth Brassart, the proprietress of the school, clashes with Julia. However, Julia is undaunted and begins collaborating on a book about French cooking for American housewives with Simone “Simca” Beck and Louisette Bertholle.

Julia continues to work diligently on the book, despite such obstacles as Paul being repeatedly reassigned, Louisette's less-than-diligent efforts on the project (she's eventually told she will get a smaller share of the royalties than Julia and Simca), and Paul's being investigated for allegedly "un-American activities."

Although Julia's book is rejected by Houghton Mifflin as too long and complicated, it is ultimately accepted and published by Alfred A. Knopf.

=== Julie Powell – 2002 ===
In 2002, Julie Powell has an unpleasant job at the Lower Manhattan Development Corporation's call center, where she answers telephone calls from victims and families of the September 11 attacks and members of the general public complaining about the LMDC's controversial plans for rebuilding the World Trade Center.

To do something she enjoys, she decides to cook every recipe in Julia Child's 1961 book Mastering the Art of French Cooking for a year while blogging about it. Her husband Eric initially supports her in this and she gains a following, but tension develops when Julie starts to get emboldened and prioritize her blog and readers over their marriage. He temporarily leaves after an argument, after which Julie expresses remorse in her blog. Finally, Julie and Eric are visited by Amanda Hesser, a food writer from The New York Times, who features her blog in a story, after which her project begins to receive the attention of journalists, literary agents, and publishers.

Julie is hurt when a journalist tells her that Julia was critical of Julie's blog project, but she retains her love and gratitude for Julia and the inspiration she provided. The last scenes show Julie and Eric visiting a reconstruction of Julia Child's kitchen at the Smithsonian Institution, and Julia in the same kitchen at her home receiving a first print edition of her cookbook and celebrating the event with Paul.

== Cast ==
- Meryl Streep as Julia Child
- Amy Adams as Julie Powell
- Stanley Tucci as Paul Child, Julia's husband
- Chris Messina as Eric Powell, Julie's husband
- Linda Emond as Simone Beck ("Simca"), with whom Julia wrote Mastering the Art of French Cooking
- Mary Lynn Rajskub as Sarah, Julie's best friend
- Jane Lynch as Dorothy Dean Cousins, Julia's sister
- Frances Sternhagen as Irma Rombauer
- Helen Carey as Louisette Bertholle, co-author of Mastering the Art of French Cooking
- Deborah Rush as Avis DeVoto, Julia's long-time pen pal and friend
- Joan Juliet Buck as Madame Elisabeth Brassart of Le Cordon Bleu, where Julia studied French cooking
- Vanessa Ferlito as Cassie, Julie's acquaintance
- Casey Wilson as Regina, Julie's acquaintance
- Jillian Bach as Annabelle, Julie's acquaintance
- Amanda Hesser as herself
- Françoise Lebrun as The Baker's Mother
- Mary Kay Place as the voice of Kay Foster, Julie's mother
- Erin Dilly as Judith Jones, Julia's editor and friend

== Release ==
On its opening weekend, the film opened #2 behind G.I. Joe: The Rise of Cobra with $20.1 million. Julie & Julia ended up grossing $94.1 million in the United States and Canada, and earned a worldwide total of $129.5 million.

== Reception ==
Julie & Julia received positive reviews, especially for Streep's performance. Rotten Tomatoes gave the film a score of 77% based on 221 reviews, with an average score of 6.7/10; the site's critical consensus states: "Boosted by Meryl Streep's charismatic performance as Julia Child, Julie & Julia is a light, but fairly entertaining culinary comedy." Metacritic, which assigns a rating out of 100 top reviews from mainstream critics, gave it an average score of 66% based on 34 reviews.

Los Angeles Times critic Kenneth Turan commented: "[Julie & Julia do] it right. A consummate entertainment that echoes the rhythms and attitudes of classic Hollywood, it's a satisfying throwback to those old-fashioned movie fantasies where impossible dreams do come true. And, in this case, it really happened. Twice."The A.V. Club gave the film a C, explaining, "Julie & Julia is two movies in one. That's one more movie than it needs to be." Entertainment Weekly gave it a B+. The review by Slate was also positive.

Streep has been widely praised for her performance as Child. Movie critic A. O. Scott of The New York Times affirmed: "By now [Streep] has exhausted every superlative that exists and to suggest that she has outdone herself is only to say that she's done it again. Her performance goes beyond physical imitation, though she has the rounded shoulders and the fluting voice down perfectly." Reviewer Peter Travers wrote in Rolling Stone that "Streep—at her brilliant, beguiling best—is the spice that does the trick for the yummy Julie & Julia." Similarly, Stephanie Zacharek of Salon concluded that "Streep isn't playing Julia Child here, but something both more elusive and more truthful— she's playing our idea of Julia Child."

=== Awards and nominations ===
Awards and Nominations
Award	Category	Nominee	Result
Academy Awards	Best Actress	Meryl Streep	Nominated
BAFTA Awards	Best Actress	Meryl Streep	Nominated
Boston Society of Film Critics Awards	Best Actress	Meryl Streep	Won
Broadcast Film Critics Association Awards	Best Actress	Meryl Streep	Won (tied with Sandra Bullock)
Chicago Film Critics Association Awards	Best Actress	Meryl Streep	Nominated
Detroit Film Critics Society Awards	Best Actress	Meryl Streep	Nominated
EDA Awards	Best Actress	Meryl Streep	Nominated
Golden Globe Awards	Best Actress – Motion Picture Musical or Comedy	Meryl Streep	Won
Golden Globe Awards	Best Motion Picture – Musical or Comedy		Nominated
Houston Film Critics Society Awards	Best Actress	Meryl Streep	Nominated
Kansas City Film Critics Circle Awards	Best Actress	Meryl Streep	Won
London Film Critics' Circle Awards	Actress of the Year	Meryl Streep	Nominated
New York Film Critics Circle Awards	Best Actress	Meryl Streep	Won
New York Film Critics Online Awards	Best Actress	Meryl Streep	Won
North Texas Film Critics Association Awards	Best Actress	Meryl Streep	Won
Oklahoma Film Critics Circle Awards	Best Actress	Meryl Streep	Won
Phoenix Film Critics Society Awards	Best Actress	Meryl Streep	Won
San Diego Film Critics Society Awards	Best Actress	Meryl Streep	Nominated
San Francisco Film Critics Circle Awards	Best Actress	Meryl Streep	Won
Satellite Awards	Best Actress – Motion Picture Musical or Comedy	Meryl Streep	Won
Satellite Awards	Best Film – Musical or Comedy		Nominated
Satellite Awards	Best Adapted Screenplay	Nora Ephron	Nominated
Screen Actors Guild Awards	Best Actress	Meryl Streep	Nominated
Southeastern Film Critics Association Awards	Best Actress	Meryl Streep	Won
St. Louis Gateway Film Critics Association Awards	Best Actress	Meryl Streep	Nominated
Toronto Film Critics Association Awards	Best Actress	Meryl Streep	Nominated
Washington DC Area Film Critics Association Awards	Best Actress	Meryl Streep	Nominated
Writers Guild of America Award	Best Adapted Screenplay	Nora Ephron	Nominated

== See also ==
- Julia's Kitchen Wisdom
