= Chasseur (sauce) =

French sauce

Sauce chasseur (French pronunciation: [sos ʃasœʁ], "hunter's sauce") is a brown sauce used in French cuisine. It is typically made using demi-glace or espagnole sauce (among the five mother sauces) as a base, and includes mushrooms and shallots or onions. It may also include tomatoes and a finishing of fines herbes.

== History ==
The name is derived from the French word for "hunter", alluding to the traditional pairings with venison, rabbit, wildfowl, and other game meats. (Note: Chasseur has several meanings in French: in addition to huntsman it can mean a person who is tenaciously looking for something, an employee of a hotel or restaurant, who is responsible for opening the doors, carrying the luggage, doing the shopping, and (formerly) a soldier belonging to the élite company of a battalion, or to an infantry or light cavalry unit.) According to Alan Davidson in The Oxford Companion to Food, sauce chasseur is "supposed to be like what hunters would put on their meat after the hunt". A culinary term, meaning "huntsmen-style" occurs in several languages and usually indicates the presence of forest mushrooms. The Italian equivalent is cacciatora, the Spanish cazadora and the Polish bigos. Some nineteenth-century food historians suggested that sauce chasseur was invented by Philippe de Mornay, whom they also credited with inventing Mornay sauce and béchamel sauce, but there is no evidence for this.

== Ingredients ==
The principal ingredients of the sauce are chopped and sautéed: they are mushrooms, shallots or onions, and usually tomatoes. Veal stock, consommé or demi-glace is added and boiled down. Some recipes omit the raw tomatoes and substitute tomato purée. Various recipes add garlic, herbs – variously sage, mint, basil, parsley, chervil or tarragon – cream, and either white wine, dry white vermouth, sherry, or brandy.

== Uses ==
Sauce chasseur accompanies a wide range of French dishes, including filets en chevreuil au chasseur (venison), tournedos chasseur (fillet of beef), poulet sauté chasseur (chicken), oeufs au chasseur (soft boiled or poached eggs), omelette chasseur (omelette with sautéed chicken livers and mushrooms, with sauce chasseur), noisettes d’agneau chasseur (noisettes of lamb), ailerons de dindonneau chasseur (turkey wings), and lapereau sauté aux champignons, chasseur (young wild rabbit).

== Notes, references and sources ==
=== Sources ===
- Beck, Simone; Louisette Bertholle; Julia Child (2012) [1961]. Mastering the Art of French Cooking, Volume One. London: Particular. ISBN 978-0-241-95339-6.
- Brazier, Eugénie (2015) [2004]. La Mère Brazier: The Mother of Modern French Cooking. London: Modern Books. ISBN 978-1-906761-84-4.
- David, Elizabeth (1999) [1950, 1951, 1955]. Elizabeth David Classics – Mediterranean Food; French Country Cooking; Summer Food (second ed.). London: Grub Street. ISBN 1-902304-27-6.
- Davidson, Alan (1999). The Oxford Companion to Food. Oxford: Oxford University Press. ISBN 978-0-19-211579-9.
- Escoffier, Auguste (1903). Le guide culinaire: aide-mémoire de cuisine pratique. Paris: Art culinaire. OCLC 1202722258.
- Montagné, Prosper (1976). Larousse gastronomique. London: Hamlyn. OCLC 1285641881.

== See also ==
- Cacciatore
- Coq au vin
- Jägerschnitzel
