= Julie Powell =

American author (1973–2022)

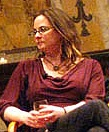
- Powell in 2009
- Born: Julia Anne Foster; April 20, 1973; Austin, Texas, U.S.
- Died: October 26, 2022 (aged 49); Olivebridge, New York, U.S.
- Education: Amherst College
- Occupations: Blogger; writer
- Spouse: Eric Powell (m. 1998)
- Writing career
- Period: 1995–2022
- Genres: Memoir; non-fiction
- Notable works: Julie & Julia: 365 Days, 524 Recipes, 1 Tiny Apartment Kitchen; Cleaving: a Story of Marriage, Meat, and Obsession

Julie Anne Powell (née Foster; April 20, 1973 – October 26, 2022) was an American author known for her 2005 book Julie & Julia: 365 Days, 524 Recipes, 1 Tiny Apartment Kitchen which was based on her blog, the Julie/Julia Project. A film adaptation based on her book called Julie & Julia was released in 2009.

Her second book, Cleaving: a Story of Marriage, Meat, and Obsession, was published in 2009.

== Early life and education ==
Powell was born April 20, 1973, to John Landrum and Kay Elaine (née Carradine) Foster. She has a brother named Jordan Foster. She was raised in Austin, Texas. She graduated from Amherst College in 1995 with a double major in theater and creative writing.

== Career ==
=== Julie & Julia: 365 Days, 524 Recipes, 1 Tiny Apartment Kitchen ===
While working for the Lower Manhattan Development Corporation in August 2002, Powell began the Julie/Julia Project, a blog on Salon chronicling her attempt to cook all the recipes in Simone Beck, Louisette Bertholle and Julia Child's Mastering the Art of French Cooking. The blog quickly gained a large following, and Powell signed a book deal with Little, Brown and Company. The resulting book, Julie and Julia: 365 Days, 524 Recipes, 1 Tiny Apartment Kitchen, was published in 2005. The paperback edition was retitled Julie and Julia: My Year of Cooking Dangerously.

Child was reported to have been unimpressed with Powell's blog, believing her determination to cook every recipe in Mastering the Art of French Cooking in a year to be a stunt. Child's editor, Judith Jones, said in an interview:

Flinging around four-letter words when cooking isn't attractive, to me or Julia. She didn't want to endorse it. What came through on the blog was somebody who was doing it almost for the sake of a stunt. She would never really describe the end results, how delicious it was, and what she learned. Julia didn't like what she called "the flimsies". She didn't suffer fools, if you know what I mean.

Reviews from others were also mixed. David Kamp writing in The New York Times disliked Powell's writing style, saying it "has too much blog in its DNA. It has a messy, whatever's-on-my-mind incontinence to it, taking us places we'd rather not go". Similarly, Keith Phipps of The A.V. Club did not think the transition from blog to memoir was handled well, asserting that its "digressive stream-of-consciousness style has become the lingua franca of the blogosphere, and while it can be an art form when dished out in daily installments, it's a slog at book length".

More positive was the review in Kirkus Reviews, which wrote approvingly of Powell's style: "Indulge in this memoir of marrow and butter, knowing there is always a bitter green to balance the taste". The review in Publishers Weekly, meanwhile, suggested that "Both home cooks and devotees of Bridget Jones–style dishing will be caught up in Powell's funny, sharp-tongued but generous writing".

In 2009, Powell was awarded an honorary diploma from Le Cordon Bleu, the same cooking school from which Child graduated in 1951.

Prior to her Julie/Julia project, Powell had never eaten an egg before she tackled Oeufs à la Fondue de Fromage. At various points in the blog, Powell confessed to loathing beans, olives, anchovies, salad, spinach, eggs and even fresh peas ("little green sacs of wet flour").

==== Film ====
The film Julie & Julia directed by Nora Ephron was released August 7, 2009. The film was based on both Julie Powell's book and Julia Child's autobiography My Life in France. Amy Adams starred as Julie Powell and Meryl Streep as Julia Child. Julie's husband, Eric, was portrayed by Chris Messina. Julia's husband, Paul, was portrayed by Stanley Tucci.

=== Cleaving: a Story of Marriage, Meat, and Obsession ===
Powell's second book, Cleaving: a Story of Marriage, Meat, and Obsession, details her experiences learning to butcher at Fleisher's butcher shop in Kingston, New York, and the effects of affairs by both her and her husband on their marriage. It was published on November 30, 2009. The work received several negative reviews based on the content of the book and Powell's openness about the affairs.

=== Return to Salon ===
In 2022, Powell started writing a series of commentary pieces for Salon about The Julia Child Challenge, a Food Network reality television show in which Powell was not involved.

== Personal life and death ==
Julie married Eric Powell, an editor for the magazine Archaeology, in 1998.

Powell died of cardiac arrest at her home in Olivebridge, New York, on October 26, 2022, at age 49. Powell was survived by her husband, as well as her brother, Jordan, and her parents, John and Kay.
