= Louis Saulnier =

Louis Saulnier may refer to:

- Louis Saulnier (writer), co-author of the cookbook Le Répertoire de la Cuisine
- Louis Saulnier (field hockey), French field hockey player
