= Onion soup =

Type of vegetable soup

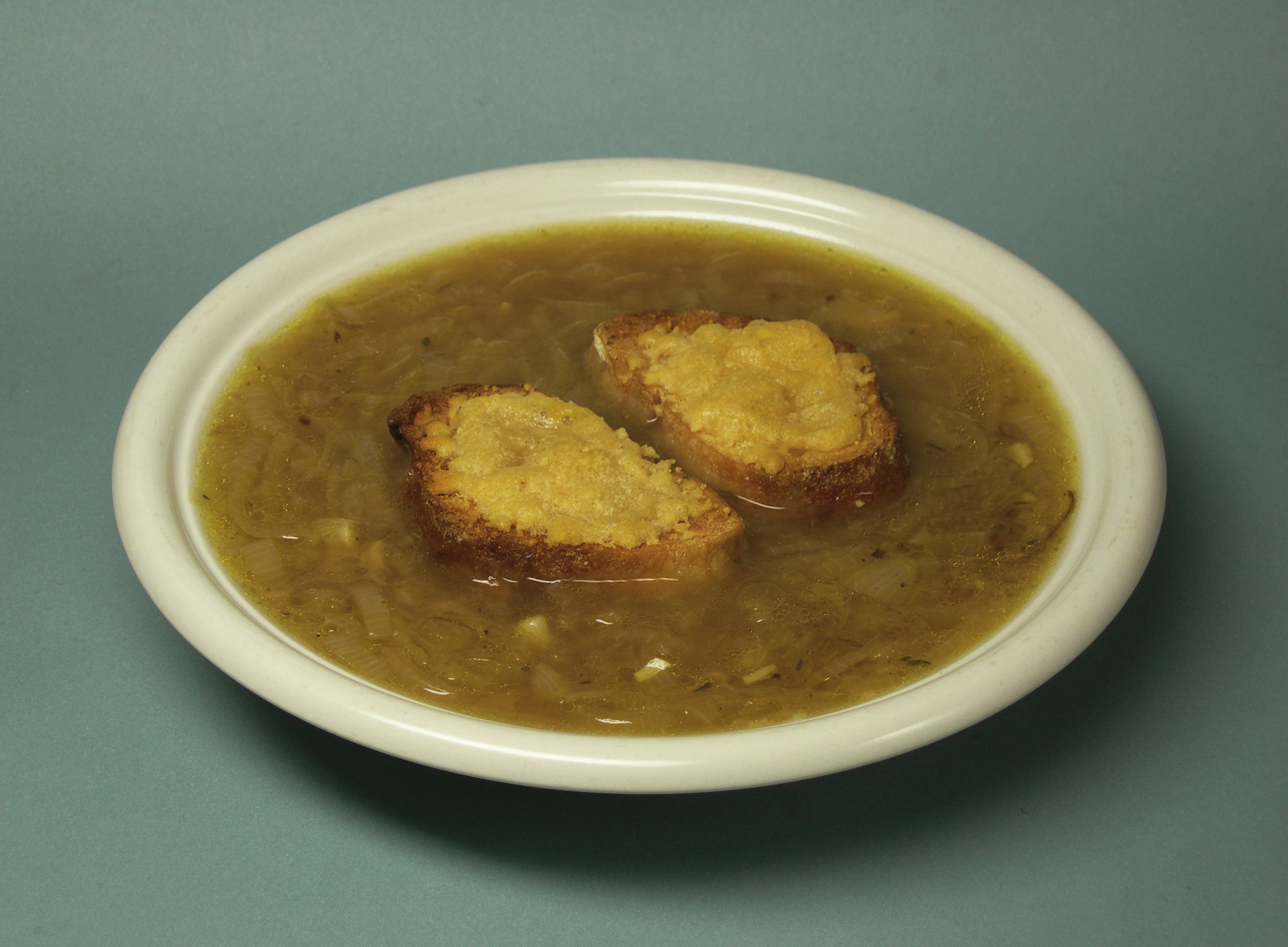
Parisian onion soup

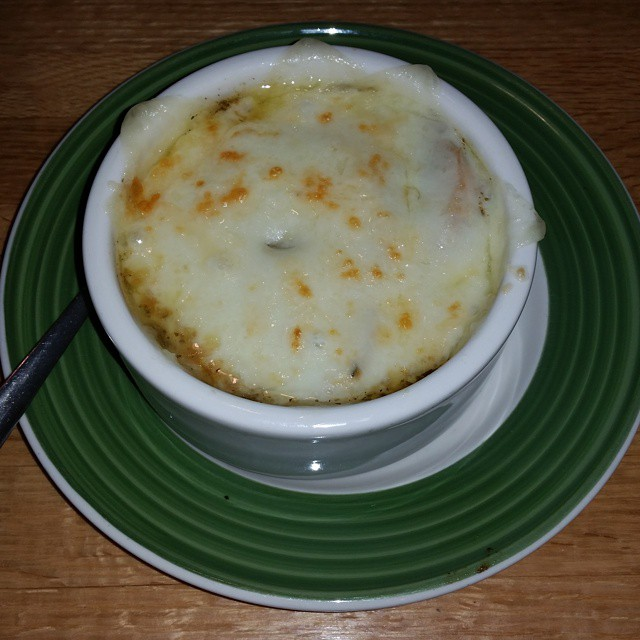
Gratinated onion cheese soup

Onion soup is a type of vegetable soup with sliced onions as the main ingredient. It is prepared in different variations in many countries, the most famous of which is French onion soup or Parisian onion soup. Because of the affordable ingredients, it has primarily been a dish for the poor for a long time.

Common for all variations of onion soup is the use of thinly sliced or chopped onions soaked in fat, and a liquid base such as water or broth, possibly including white wine, after which the soup is cooked for a while so that the onions lose their strong flavour and the soup gains a sweet, spicy flavour. In many recipes the soup is thickened with flour or egg yolks.

== French onion soup ==
An early recipe called soupe à l'oignon appears in the recipe collection Le Viandier by Guillaume Tirel in the 15th century. François Pierre La Varenne, the chef of Marie de' Medici, described the use of bread as an addition to onion soup in his 1651 cookbook Le Cuisinier François.

The French or Parisian onion soup (soupe à l'oignon or soupe d'oignons aux Halles) was already offered as food for merchants, customers and tourists in the Quartier des Halles in the 18th century.

The classic way to prepare the dish is to slowly cook thinly sliced onions, sometimes also garlic, in butter or vegetable oil, until they gain a golden yellow colour, then to sprinkle them with flour and soak them in white wine. Then water and vegetable broth or more commonly, meat broth is added and the soup is slowly cooked. It is also common to soak roasted bits of white bread (croutons) in the soup, add shredded cheese and gratinate the whole dish (soupe à l'oignon gratinée or soupe au fromage, see also cheese soup).

Strasbourg onion soup is similar to Parisian, the difference being the use of croutons and a raw egg yolk.

A further variety is the soupe soubise, where the onions are puréed and the soup is thickened with béchamel sauce. Instead of roasted bread the soup is served with croutons and bits of choux pastry. Similarly to Soubise sauce, the soup was named after its creator, the field marshal and gourmet Charles, Prince of Soubise.

== German onion soup ==
Onion soup similar to the French variety is also known in Germany. The Palatinate onion soup is prepared with cream and wine, spiced with caraway, and served with roast bread without cheese. The south German onion soup is thickened with light roux, run through a sieve, thickened with egg yolk and served with bits of roast bread. Marie Buchmeier's 1885 cookbook Praktischem Kochbuch für die bürgerliche, sowie feine Küche contains an extremely simple recipe for the soup, where sliced dark bread is soaked in a terrine, soaked with boiling water and served with sliced onions turned yellow with butter. Onion soup from the Rhine area contains onions, meat broth, bits of carrot and roasted bratwurst. The soup is run through a sieve and spiced with vinegar, the bratwurst is sliced and served along the soup. Hamburgian onion soup is prepared with shallots, meat broth and sherry and served with croutons and cheese.

== Italian onion soup ==
As well as the French onion soup, there is also a variety in Italy, where milk is substituted for the broth and the wine. It is served with croutons and shredded Parmesan cheese, which are not roasted.

The Cipollata is a dish of its own, resembling the German Eintopf soup. It is prepared with onions, sliced bacon and tomatoes, which are thoroughly boiled and added to the soup with a mix of Parmesan and whipped eggs. If the soup becomes too thick it is watered down. Cipollata is also served with roast bread.

== Middle Eastern onion soup ==
Chorba is a category of onion-based soups common in the Middle East and West Asia, often made with varying ingredients relative to regional and national cuisines. They typically also include vegetables, a type of meat (beef, chicken, lamb and mutton or goat meat) and legumes, which are simmered together with onions in broth.

== Bibliography ==
- Herings Lexikon der Küche. 23rd edition, Fachbuchverlag Pfannenberg, Haan-Gruiten, 2001, ISBN 3-8057-0470-4
- Erhard Gorys: Das neue Küchenlexikon. dtv, Munich, 1994–2002, ISBN 3-423-36245-6
- Madeleine Dupré: Die berühmte französische Küche. Heyne Verlag, Munich, 1975, ISBN 3-453-40162-X
- André Castelot: L'Histoire à Table, 1972. ISBN 2-262-00130-8
- Henriette Davidis, Luise Holle: Praktisches Kochbuch für die gewöhnliche und feinere Küche. Revised edition by Luise Holle. Bielefeld / Leipzig, 1898
- Marie Buchmeier: Praktisches Kochbuch für die bürgerliche, sowie feine Küche, enthaltend circa 1500 Kochrecepte. Landshut o. J. (around 1885)
- Accademia della Cucina Italiana (publisher): Das große Buch der italienischen Küche. Delphin Verlag, Munich, 1987. ISBN 3-7735-5317-X
- Der Silberlöffel. Phaidon Verlag, Berlin, 2006, ISBN 0-7148-9665-9
