= Alex Prud'homme =

American journalist

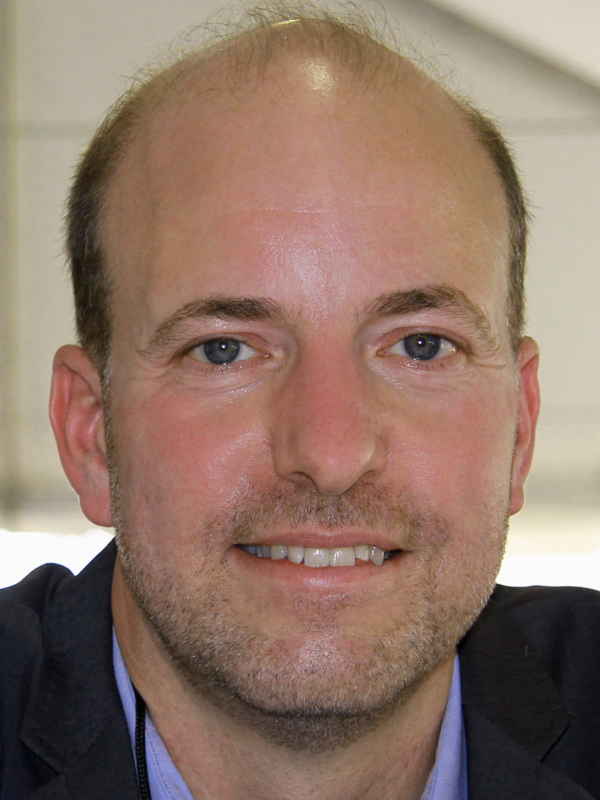
- Alex Prud'homme at the 2011 Texas Book Festival
- Born: 1961 (age 64–65); New York City
- Education: Middlebury College (B.A., History, 1984)
- Occupations: author and journalist
- Relatives: Julia Child (great aunt); Paul Cushing Child (great uncle)

Alex Prud’homme (born 1961) is an American journalist and the author of several non-fiction books.

== Early life and education ==
Prud'homme is a native of New York City, a 1984 graduate of Middlebury College, and attended the Bread Loaf Writers' Conference.

== Writings ==
Prud'homme's journalism has appeared in many publications, including The New York Times, The New Yorker, Vanity Fair, Talk, Time, and People.

Prud'homme collaborated with his great-aunt Julia Child on the book My Life in France (Alfred A. Knopf, 2006), her memoir of discovering food and life in postwar Paris and Marseille. The book became a number one New York Times best-seller, and inspired half of the 2009 movie Julie & Julia, starring Meryl Streep as Julia Child. In 2007, the book won the Literary Food Writing award from the International Association of Culinary Professionals (IACP).

Prud'homme previously wrote, with co-author Michael Cherkasky, Forewarned (Random House, 2003), about terrorism. He followed that with The Cell Game (HarperCollins, 2004), about the ImClone scandal; The Ripple Effect: The Fate of Fresh Water in the Twenty-First Century (Scribner, 2011); and Hydrofracking: What Everyone Needs to Know (Oxford University Press, 2014).

Returning to Julia Child a decade after her memoir, Prud'homme wrote The French Chef in America: Julia Child's Second Act (Alfred A. Knopf, 2016). The paperback is now available (Anchor Books, 2017).

With photo curator Katie Pratt, he published France is a Feast: the Photographic Journey of Paul and Julia Child, a selection of Paul Child's photographs from 1948 to 1954 (Thames & Hudson, 2017).

External videos
- Q&A interview with Prud'homme on Dinner With the President, February 19, 2023, C-SPAN

In 2023, he published Dinner With The President: Food, Politics, and a History of Breaking Bread at the White House.

== See also ==
- Water crisis
