= Cacciatore =

Italian dish

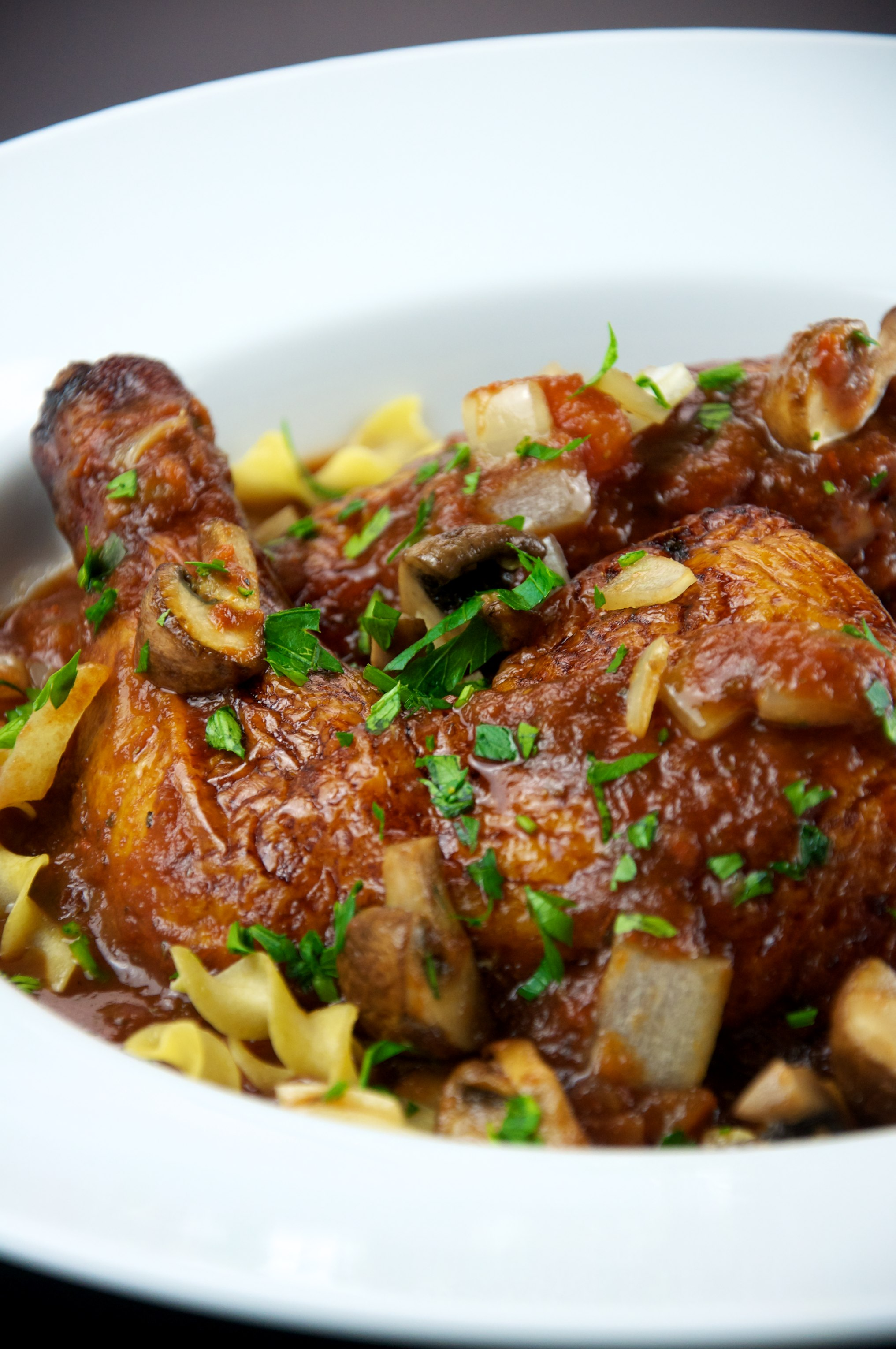
- Chicken cacciatore
- Alternative names: Cacciatora
- Course: Secondo (Italian course)
- Place of origin: Italy
- Serving temperature: Hot or tepid
- Variations: Various

Cacciatore (lit. 'hunter') (Note: /ˌkɑːtʃəˈtɔːri/, /ˌkætʃ-/; Italian: [kattʃaˈtoːre]) or cacciatora is an Italian dish prepared with meat, onions, herbs, usually tomatoes, often peppers, and sometimes wine.

Cacciatore is popularly made with braised chicken (pollo alla cacciatora) or rabbit (coniglio alla cacciatora), abbacchio (abbacchio alla cacciatora), an Italian preparation of lamb, capon (cappone alla cacciatora) or potatoes (patate alla cacciatora). Preparations vary by region. In southern Italy for example, cacciatore often includes red wine, while in northern Italy, it typically includes white wine. Some versions of the dish use mushrooms.

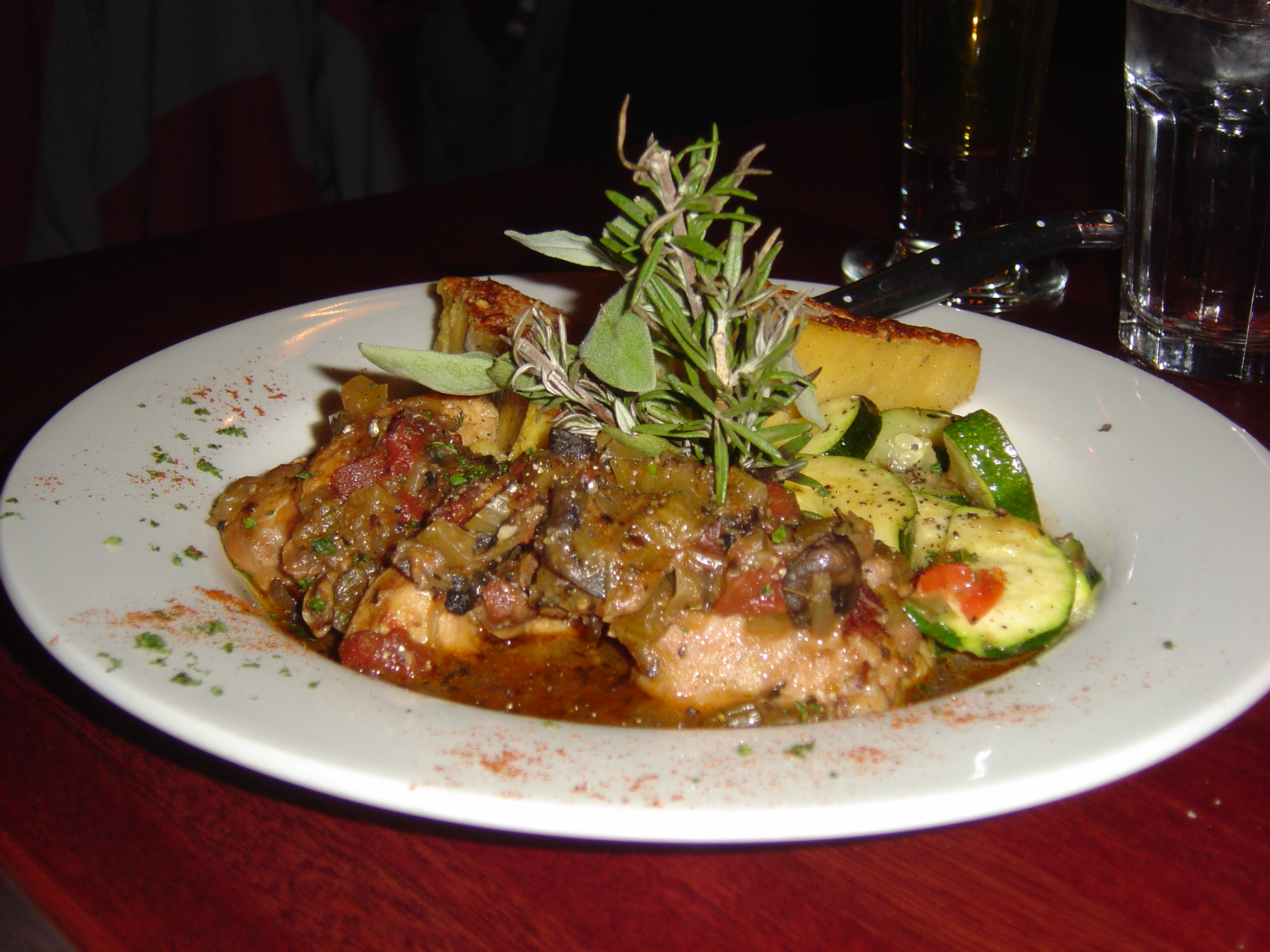
Rabbit cacciatore

In abbacchio alla cacciatora, pieces of abbacchio are browned in lard and then cooked for almost an hour with garlic, sage, rosemary, and salted anchovy paste. This recipe, typical of Roman cuisine, is prepared throughout Italy. It is consumed throughout central Italy year round, especially for Sunday Lunch, and is eaten as an Easter and Christmas dish.

As of the 1990s in the southern Italian region of Campania, chicken cacciatore braised in white wine and tomato sauce was the most popular chicken dish. The preparation used rosemary, and onions rather than garlic. A variation eaten in the broader region including sweet red peppers, was extolled as containing the crucial ingredient for chicken cacciatori by Sophia Loren.

A famous and very similar dish to rabbit cacciatore is eaten on the island of Ischia off the Gulf of Naples, named coniglio all'ischitana ('Ischian-style rabbit'). Like rabbit caciatore, cooking the dish involves stewing rabbit in tomato sauce, garlic, and white wine. Various elements that distinguish the dishes have been put forward; the presence of a local wild variety of thyme called piperno, or the inclusion of rabbit intestines in the sauce, but by the 1990s, it was debated whether reproducing these elements was still observed.

== See also ==
Media related to Cacciatore at Wikimedia Commons Chicken Cacciatore at the Wikibooks Cookbook subproject

- Chasseur
- Coq au vin
