= Lovell Thompson =

American publisher

Lovell Thompson (d. 15 December 1986) was an American publisher.

Thompson was from Ipswich, Massachusetts. His father was the editor of Youth's Companion (Thompson later edited a 1954 anthology of that magazine's best work). He graduated from Harvard University in 1925 and served in the Coast Guard during World War II.

Thompson worked 42 years at Houghton Mifflin in Boston starting in 1924 where he led the General Trade Division for more than half those years. Upon his retirement in 1967, Thompson co-founded Gambit Inc. in Ipswich. Throughout his career, he had a reputation among his colleagues for giving a priority to quality books over easy profits.

A short story of his was collected in the 1937 Best American Short Stories.

He married Katherine Simonds, an editorial reader at Houghton Mifflin. Their engagement was established when Thompson sent her an engagement ring through interdepartmental mail.

Thompson established Ipswich's Heritage Trust and with his wife began Ipswich 17th Century Day. He served on the Ipswich Historical Commission and the Massachusetts Historical Society which, in 1971, awarded him its John F. Kennedy Medal.
