= Le Cercle des Gourmettes =

- Formation: 1929
- Founder: Paulette Edlinger
- Legal status: Disbanded
- Purpose: Gourmet food appreciation
- Location: Paris
- Members: Exclusive
- Official language: French
- Key people: Julia Child, Simone Beck, Louisette Bertholle

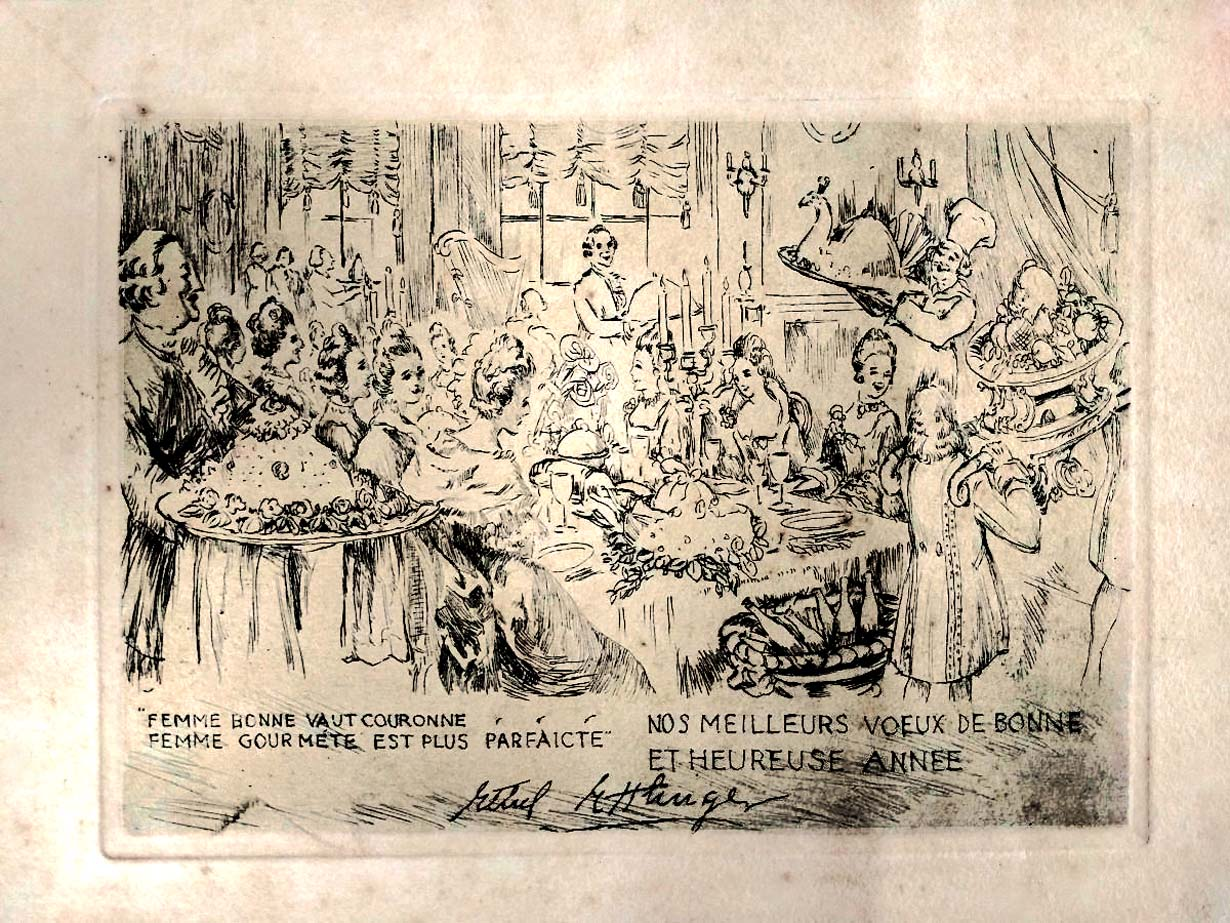
1938 greeting card from the Cercle des Gourmettes

Le Cercle des Gourmettes was an exclusive club or "circle" of women in Paris devoted to gourmet food. The circle was started in 1929 by an American, Paulette Edlinger, and the name may have been a bon mot in protest of the non-feminine form of the word gourmet.

The club began at a time of economic prosperity just prior to the Great Depression in France. It was started by the wives of members of Club des Cent and convened on alternate Fridays to enjoy lunches and dinners at the electric company headquarters in Paris, Electricité et Gaz. The club's most famous members were Julia Child, Simone Beck, and Louisette Bertholle. Each joined the club in the late 1940s.

Versions of the club later existed in Canada and Switzerland.
