= Henri Mouquin =

New York restauranteur

Henri Mouquin (October 11, 1837 – December 24, 1933) was a New York restaurateur. He was born in Aubonne, near Lausanne, in Switzerland. His father and grandfather were both hoteliers, and as a boy he became acquainted with Napoleon III, who visited his father's hotel. At age 17 he went to Paris, and then left Europe for the United States. His first job was as a waiter at Delmonico's in New York, and over the next twenty years he worked in various jobs as far west as St. Louis. In 1857 he started his first restaurant, and in 1859 he married Marie Grandjean, who also came from Vaud, the canton in Switzerland where Mouquin was born.

His first restaurant was at the corner of Fulton St and Nassau St in Manhattan; his wife did the cooking. He also opened a wine importing business and was at one time the largest wine importer in the U.S. The restaurant became popular and because of its relatively low prices brought many staples of French cuisine to New Yorkers previously unfamiliar with them.

Mouquin died at his home in Williamsburg, Virginia, on December 24, 1933.
