= Stéphane Reynaud =

French chef and cookery writer

Stéphane Reynaud is a French chef and cookery writer.

Reynaud comes from a family of butchers and pig farmers in the Ardèche region of France. He lives in Paris with his wife and three children.

His 2005 book Pork and Sons won the 2005 Grand Prix de la Gastronomie Française. Reynaud has appeared on The Martha Stewart Show and National Public Radio’s The Splendid Table.

== Bibliography ==
- 2007 - Pork and Sons (Phaidon Press) ISBN 978-0-7148-4761-0
- 2008 - Terrine (Phaidon Press) ISBN 978-0-7148-4848-8
- 2009 - French Feasts: 299 Traditional Recipes for Family Meals & Gatherings (Stewart, Tabori, & Chang) ISBN 978-1-58479-794-4
- 2009 - Rôtis: Roasts for Every Day of the Week (Murdoch Books) ISBN 978-1-74196-537-7
- 2010 - Stéphane Reynaud's 365 Good Reasons to Sit Down to Eat (Murdoch Books) ISBN 978-1-74196-919-1
- 2012 - Stéphane Reynaud's Barbecue (Murdoch Books) ISBN 978-1-74266-657-0
- 2013 - Stéphane Reynaud's Pies & Tarts (Murdoch Books) ISBN 978-1-74336-973-9
- 2014 - Stéphane Reynaud's Book of Tripe (Murdoch Books) ISBN 978-1-74336-969-2
- 2014 - Stéphane Reynaud's Gourmet Hot Dogs (Murdoch Books) ISBN 978-1-74336-317-1
