= École des trois gourmandes =

L'école des trois gourmandes (The School of the Three Hearty Eaters) was a cooking school founded in Paris during the 1950s by Simone Beck, Louisette Bertholle and Julia Child. The work done by the school was later expanded into the two-volume Mastering the Art of French Cooking series, published in 1961 and 1970, and Child wore the logo of the school as a badge for much of her television career.

== Notable alumni ==
- Isabel Campabadal
