= Le Répertoire de la cuisine =

1914 cookbook by Gringoire and Saulnier

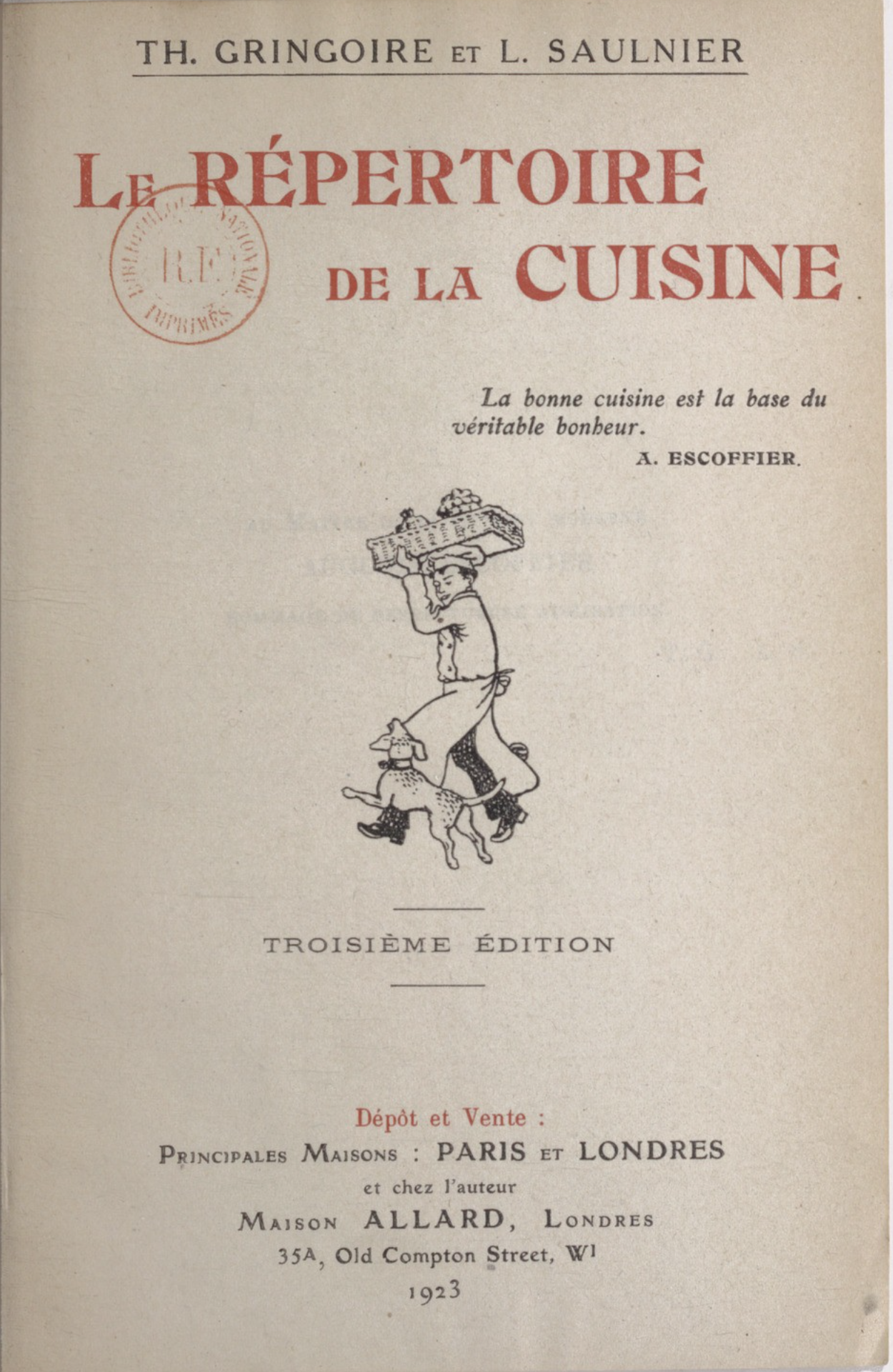
- 3rd French edition (1923)
- Author: Louis Saulnier, Théophile Gringoire
- Language: French
- Subject: Culinary Arts
- Genre: non-fiction
- Publisher: Groupe Flammarion
- Publication date: 1914
- Publication place: United Kingdom
- Media type: book
- Pages: 240
- ISBN: 978-2082000192 (2010 edition)

Le répertoire de la cuisine is a professional reference cookbook written by Théophile Gringoire and Louis Saulnier and published in 1914; it has gone through multiple editions and been translated into multiple languages. It summarizes Le Guide culinaire by Auguste Escoffier, and adds a significant amount of Saulnier's own material.

== History ==
Louis Saulnier, a follower of Auguste Escoffier, wrote the Répertoire as a guide to Escoffier's Le Guide culinaire. It is a standard reference for classical French haute cuisine and has been translated into English and Spanish.

Its first edition was published in 1914 by the Maison Allard in London and its 32nd in 1976 by Flammarion. Saulnier was a chef entremetier and the secretary of the Union des Cuisiniers, Pâtissiers et Glaciers Français de Londres; Gringoire (a pseudonym for Victor Thomas) was a writer and the editor in chief of Le Carnet d'Épicure (1911-1914), a gastronomic monthly in London under the auspices of Escoffier.

The first English translation was by Édouard Brunet in 1924; the 15th English edition was published in London in 1979. The 1976 American edition has an introduction by Jacques Pépin.

== Format ==
The style of Le Répertoire is highly condensed, even in comparison with the brevity of its inspiration; it is a sort of aide-memoire for combinations of base ingredient, sauce, and garnish, a codification of conventional or standard names for the combinations used in classical cooking. It follows the structure of Escoffier's original to simplify cross-referencing.

The recipes provided are little more than simple descriptions of dishes, and assume a great deal of background knowledge, saying nothing about cooking techniques, timings, or proportions. For example, this is the complete recipe for Poulet sauté Bonne-Femme (in the section on poulet sauté):

Sauter. Déglacer vin blanc et jus lié. Garnir lardons, petits oignons, pommes cocotte.
Sauté. Deglaze with white wine and thickened juices. Garnish with lardons, small onions, and cocotte potatoes.

== Reputation ==
The Culinary Institute of America instructor Uwe Hestnar mentions Le Répertoire alongside Larousse gastronomique and the works of Escoffier and Carême as required reading for anyone interested in classical French cooking.
