= Mastering the Art of French Cooking =

Cookbook by Simone Beck, Louisette Bertholle and Julia Child

- Cover of Volume 1, original 1961 edition
- Author: Simone Beck, Louisette Bertholle, Julia Child
- Illustrator: Sidonie Coryn
- Cover artist: Paul Kidby
- Language: English
- Subject: Culinary arts
- Genre: non-fiction
- Publisher: Alfred A. Knopf
- Publication date: 1961 (vol. 1), 1970 (vol. 2)
- Publication place: United States/France
- Media type: book
- Pages: 726
- ISBN: 0-375-41340-5 (40th anniversary edition)
- OCLC: 429389109
- LC Class: TX719 .C454 2009
- Followed by: The French Chef Cookbook, Simca's Cuisine

Mastering the Art of French Cooking is a two-volume French cookbook written by Simone Beck and Louisette Bertholle, both from France, and Julia Child, from the United States. The book was written for the American market and published by Knopf in 1961 (Volume 1) and 1970 (Volume 2).

The success of Volume 1 resulted in Julia Child being given her own television show, The French Chef, one of the first cooking programs on American television. Historian David Strauss claimed in 2011 that the publication of Mastering the Art of French Cooking "did more than any other event in the last half century to reshape the gourmet dining scene".

== History ==
After World War II, interest in French cuisine rose significantly in the United States. Through the late 1940s and 1950s, Americans interested in preparing French dishes had few options. Gourmet magazine offered French recipes to subscribers monthly, and several dozen French cookbooks were published throughout the 1950s. These recipes, however, were directly translated from French, and consequently were designed for a middle-class French audience that was familiar with French cooking techniques, had access to common French ingredients, and who often had servants cook for them.

In the early 1950s, Simone Beck and Louisette Bertholle, French cooking teachers who had trained at Le Cordon Bleu, sought to capitalize on the American market for French cookbooks and wrote and published a small recipe book for American audiences, What's Cooking in France, in 1952. By the late 1950s, Beck and Bertholle were interested in writing a comprehensive guide to French cuisine that would appeal to serious middle-class American home cooks. Beck and Bertholle wanted an English-speaking partner to help give them insight into American culture, translate their work into English, and bring it to American publishers, so they invited their friend Julia Child, who had also studied at Le Cordon Bleu, to collaborate with them on a book tentatively titled "French Cooking for the American Kitchen". The resulting cookbook, Mastering the Art of French Cooking, proved groundbreaking and has since become a standard guide for the culinary community.

Beck, Bertholle, and Child wanted to distinguish their book from others on the market by emphasizing accurate instructions and measurements in their recipes, and authenticity whenever possible. After prototyping dishes in their Paris cooking school, L'École des trois gourmandes, Child would check to make sure the ingredients were available in the average American grocery store; if they were not, she would suggest a substitution and they would begin the prototyping process again with the substituted ingredient, sometimes flying in ingredients from America to perform their tests. While Beck, Bertholle, and Child wanted all of the recipes to be as authentic as possible, they were willing to adapt to American palates and cooking techniques. Child had noted early in the process that Americans would be "scared off" by too many expensive ingredients, like black truffles, and would expect broccoli, not particularly popular in France, to be served with many meals, and adjustments were made to accommodate these tastes. American home cooks at the time were also more inclined to use appliances like garlic presses and mixers than French cooks, and so Child insisted that supplemental instructions for cooks using these appliances be included in the book alongside the normal instructions.

Mastering the Art of French Cooking Volume 1 was originally published in 1961 after some early difficulties. Beck, Bertholle, and Child initially signed a contract with publisher Houghton Mifflin, but Houghton Mifflin grew uninterested in the project. Child recalled one editor telling her, "Americans don't want an encyclopedia, they want to cook something quick, with a mix." Beck, Bertholle, and Child refused to make requested changes to the manuscript, and Houghton Mifflin abandoned the project, writing that the book, as it stood, would be "too formidable to the American housewife." Judith Jones of Alfred A. Knopf became interested in the manuscript after it had been rejected. After spending several years in Paris, Jones had moved to New York, where she grew frustrated with the limited ingredients and recipes commonly available in the United States. Jones felt that the manuscript would offer a lifeline to middle-class women, like her, who were interested in learning how to cook French cuisine in America, and predicted that Mastering the Art of French Cooking, "will do for French cooking here in America what Rombauer's The Joy of Cooking did for standard [American] cooking." While Jones was enthusiastic about the book, Knopf had low expectations and invested very little into promoting it. In order to generate interest in the book, and without support from Knopf, Child appeared on several morning talk shows in 1961 to demonstrate recipes, which she later cited as the impetus for her own cooking show, The French Chef.

Volume 1 was immensely successful, and work on Volume 2 began around 1964, as a collaboration between Simone Beck and Julia Child, but not Louisette Bertholle. By the end of 1960, Beck and Child had grown frustrated with Bertholle because they felt she did not contribute enough to Mastering the Art of French Cooking to merit co-authorship and one third of the book's proceeds, and wanted Knopf to change the byline to read "by Simone Beck and Julia Child with Louisette Bertholle." Beck argued, "it is bad for the book for her to present herself as Author, as she really does not cook well enough, or know enough," and that Bertholle should only be entitled to 10% of the profits (to Beck and Child's 45% each). Ultimately, the contract with the publisher necessitated that Bertholle be given a co-author credit, and the final profit split was 18% to Bertholle and 41% each to Beck and Child. The dispute left Bertholle extremely upset, and effectively severed the professional partnership between herself and Beck and Child.

Volume 2 expanded on certain topics of interest that had not been covered as completely as the three had planned in the first volume, particularly baking. In an otherwise laudatory review of Volume 1, Craig Claiborne wrote that Beck, Bertholle, and Child had conspicuously omitted recipes for puff pastry and croissants, making their work feel incomplete. Bread became one of the primary focuses of Volume 2, and the main source of tension between Beck and Child and their publisher, Knopf. Knopf feared that the bread recipes that Beck and Child were testing would be stolen by a competing publisher, and insisted Beck and Child cease their semi-public testing of the recipes to reduce risk, which Beck and Child agreed to reluctantly.

Child became increasingly frustrated with the project as work on Volume 2 went on. Not only was she agitated by the demands of the publisher, she was growing tired of working with Beck, who she felt was too demanding. Child was also angry that, while Mastering the Art of French Cooking had been a runaway success in the United States, there was virtually no demand for the book in France itself, leading her to exclaim, "French women don't know a damn thing about French cooking, although they pretend they know everything." Her experience writing Volume 2, along with her continued success on television, led Child to sever her partnership with Beck and preclude the possibility of a Volume 3, even though Beck, Bertholle, and Child had always intended the work to span five volumes.

== Contents ==
Volume 1 covers the basics of French cooking, striking a balance between the complexities of haute cuisine and the practicalities of the American home cook. Traditional favorites such as beef bourguignon, bouillabaisse, and cassoulet are featured. This volume has been through many printings and has been reissued twice with revisions: first in 1983 with updates for changes in kitchen practice (especially the food processor), and then in 2003 as a 40th anniversary edition with the history of the book in the introduction. The cookbook includes 524 recipes.

Some classic French baking is also included, but baking had already received a more thorough treatment in Volume 2, published in 1970.

== Reception and legacy ==
Volume 1 of Mastering the Art of French Cooking received overwhelmingly positive reviews when it was first released in 1961. In the New York Times, Craig Claiborne wrote that the recipes in the book "are glorious, whether they are for a simple egg in aspic or for a fish souffle," and that it "is not a book for those with a superficial interest in food...but for those who take a fundamental delight in the pleasures of cuisine." Michael Field, writing for the New York Review of Books, praised Beck, Bertholle, and Child for "not limiting themselves to la haute cuisine," and stated that "for once, the architectural structure of the French cuisine is firmly and precisely outlined in American terms." Field's sole criticism of the book was that the authors suggested dry vermouth as a substitute for white wine, as he felt the domestic vermouth available to American home cooks, the book's target audience, was "bland and characterless." Despite being a relatively expensive cookbook, retailing for $10 in 1965 (about $90 today), Mastering the Art of French Cooking Volume 1 did well commercially, selling over 100,000 copies in less than five years. According to Julia Child biographer Noel Riley Fitch, the publication of Mastering the Art of French Cooking instantaneously changed the entire American cookbook industry, leading more cookbook publishers to place emphasis on clarity and precision, and away from the "chatty and sometimes sketchy" style that had typified American cookbooks.

On its release in 1970, Volume 2 was also well received. Critics praised the book's comprehensiveness, but some felt that it was far too ambitious for the average home cook. Gael Greene, reviewing the book for Life, wrote that Volume 2 was "a classic continued," and made the contents of Volume 1 look like "mud-pie stuff," while Raymond Sokolov wrote that "it is without rival, the finest gourmet cookbook for the non-chef in the history of American stomachs." The New York Times' review was mixed, with critic Nika Hazelton praising the book for being "elegant and accurate," but criticized it for being too interested in minutia and theory to be useful for the home cook. Learning French cooking from Mastering the Art of French Cooking, she wrote, would be akin to "learning to drive a car by having the workings of the internal combustion engine described in full detail." Similarly, Nancy Ross of The Washington Post and Times-Herald argued that many of the recipes in Volume 2 would be far too time-consuming, difficult, and expensive for the American home cook, pointing out that the recipe for French bread provided in the book was nineteen pages long, took seven hours to complete, and required the use of "a brick and a sheet of asbestos cement."

The 2009 film, Julie & Julia, is based on Child's memoir My Life in France and Julie Powell's memoir Julie and Julia: My Year of Cooking Dangerously. The success of this film, combined with a tied-in reissue of the 40th Anniversary edition, caused it to once again become a bestseller in the United States, 48 years after its initial release.

Critical perception of Mastering the Art of French Cooking has generally remained positive. In 2015, The Daily Telegraph ranked it as the second greatest cookbook of all time, behind Fergus Henderson's Nose to Tail Eating. In a 2012 New York Times piece commemorating Julia Child's 100th birthday, Julia Moskin wrote that Mastering the Art of French Cooking should be credited with "turning the tide" on American food culture 1961, when "trends including feminism, food technology and fast food seemed ready to wipe out home cooking." Moskin added that, "in its fundamental qualities, the book and its many successors in the Child canon aren't dated at all. Their recipes remain perfectly written and rock-solid reliable." By contrast, food writer Regina Schrambling argued in 2009 that the book "seems overwhelming in a Rachael Ray world," its recipes overly complicated and unsuited for modern American tastes.

== Foreign editions ==
A British edition was published by Cassell and Company in 1963, with the American measurements (cups, sticks etc) replaced with British ones (pints, pounds and ounces, etc). The prose was Anglicised (e.g. "tin opener" for "can opener", "colour" for "color", "savoury" for "savory") and oven temperatures were given in gas regulos as well as Fahrenheit. The food writer Elizabeth David called the English edition of the book:

A very remarkable work indeed, dealing mainly with the finer French cooking. The techniques explained, and more authentically and fully explained than in any previous cookery book in the English language, are applicable to all French cooking of whatever category. The book is illustrated with instructive line drawings. An important reference book for every serious cook, amateur or professional.

Translations into many languages followed, including Chinese (掌握法国菜的烹饪艺术 – Zhang wo fa guo cai de peng ren yi shu); Czech (Umění francouzské kuchyně); Dutch (De kunst van het Koken) German (Französisch kochen); Italian (L'arte della cucina francese}; Korean (프랑스 요리의 기술 – Peurangseu yori ui gisul); Norwegian (Det gode franske kjøkken); Russian (Уроки французской кулинарии – Uroki frantsuzskoĭ kulinarii); Spanish (El arte de la cocina francesa) and Swedish (Det goda franska köket).

== See also ==
- La bonne cuisine de Madame E. Saint-Ange
- Julie & Julia
- The Joy of Cooking
- Larousse Gastronomique
- Pellegrino Artusi
