= Louisette Bertholle =

French chef and author (1905–1999)

- Born: Louisette Remion; 26 October 1905; France
- Died: 26 November 1999 (aged 94)
- Occupations: Chef and Author
- Notable work: Mastering the Art of French Cooking
- Title: Comtesse de Nalèche

Louisette Bertholle (26 October 1905 – 26 November 1999) was a French cooking teacher and writer, best known as one of the three authors (with Julia Child and Simone Beck) of the bestselling cookbook Mastering the Art of French Cooking.

== History ==
She was born Louisette Remion on 26 October 1905. Sometime after 1928, she married Paul Bertholle, a businessman.

After World War II, Louisette Bertholle, who had the idea of writing a French cookbook for American cooks, met Simone Beck via the Le Cercle des Gourmettes culinary club and the two began to develop the concept further, collecting recipes and testing them. Their initial attempts at writing were unsuccessful, however their idea was rekindled in 1949 when they met Julia Child. In 1951, the three women founded their own cooking school, L'École des Trois Gourmandes (The School of the Three Food Lovers). It was created to give French cooking lessons to American women living in Paris where the three friends proudly wore aprons adorned with their school's logo. Years later, Child pinned the patch to her blouse during cooking demonstrations and her television series, The French Chef. Bertholle and Beck successfully published the short cookbook What's Cooking in France in 1952.

By 1960 Bertholle's life had changed significantly: her marriage was failing, she was having financial difficulties and was already over 50. However, she was able to reinvent herself and restart her career via her participation with Child and Beck. The three women had initially signed a contract to publish Mastering the Art of French Cooking with Houghton Mifflin. The publishing company ultimately rejected the submitted manuscript, believing it was too much like an encyclopedia. When it was finally published in 1961 by Alfred A. Knopf, the 734-page book was a best-seller and received critical acclaim.

Bertholle later remarried, to the Comte Henry Bandit de Nalèche, becoming the Comtesse de Nalèche in the process. She published additional books in France, and wrote a daily recipe for France-Soir until age 84.

She is played by American actress Helen Carey in the 2009 film Julie & Julia.

== Bibliography ==
- What's Cooking in France (1952, coauthor with Simone Beck)
- Mastering the Art of French Cooking (1961, coauthor with Julia Child and Simone Beck)
- Secrets of the Great French Restaurants (1974)
- Une Grande Cuisine Pour Tous (1976)
- French Cuisine For All (1980)
