= Simone Beck =

French cooking author and teacher (1904–1991)

- Beck in 1972
- Born: 7 July 1904; Normandy, France
- Died: 20 December 1991 (aged 87); Châteauneuf-de-Grasse, France
- Occupations: Author; cooking teacher
- Spouses: Jacques Jarlaud (m. 1923–1933) Jean Victor Fischbacher (m. 1937)
- Writing career
- Pen name: Simca
- Genre: Cookbooks
- Notable work: What's Cooking in France?

Simone "Simca" Beck (7 July 1904 – 20 December 1991) was a French cookbook writer and cooking teacher who, along with colleagues Julia Child and Louisette Bertholle, played a significant role in the introduction of French cooking technique and recipes into American kitchens.

== Early life ==
Beck was born on 7 July 1904, in Tocqueville-en-Caux, near Dieppe in Normandy. Her family was rich because they had a business in production of Bénédictine liqueur. When she was little, she liked helping her family cook to prepare desserts or entire meals.

In 1923, at her parents' urging to marry, she wed Jacques Jarlaud. After surviving a car crash in 1928, she worked for four years bookbinding and being a sales representative, where she met her second husband. In 1933, at the end of her marriage with Jacques Jarlaud, she applied to the Le Cordon Bleu school in Paris.

In 1936, Beck met Jean Victor Fischbacher. After marrying him in 1937, she kept her maiden name as a pen name and professionally, but used her husband's name socially.

== Cooking career ==
The start of Beck's professional career as a cook and teacher was after World War II, and after joining Le Cercle des Gourmettes, an exclusive women's culinary club. She became involved in the world of cooking. She was inspired to write a cookbook for Americans by Louisette Bertholle and Fischbacher.

The first attempt at writing a cookbook was not successful, so Beck and Bertholle published the brief What's Cooking in France? in 1952. After that Beck published a booklet Le pruneau devant le fourneau: Recettes de cuisine (ca. 1952), Beck's only publication in French. In 1949, after she had met Julia Child, she became inspired to write a French cookbook for Americans again. She, Child, and Bertholle together wrote Mastering the Art of French Cooking, which was published in 1961. Mastering the Art of French Cooking, Vol. II (without Louisette Bertholle) followed in 1970, elaborating on several subjects (particularly baking and charcuterie) that the authors felt had received insufficient coverage in the first volume.

Both Bertholle and Child became members of Le Cercle des Gourmettes. After three years, the three women formed l'École des trois gourmandes to give lessons in French cooking to American women who lived in Paris. This school had been working up to the late 1970s. While Child became a successful television chef in the United States, Beck continued her teaching practice at home. In 1972 she published her own cookbook, Simca's Cuisine (with Patricia Simon), using some of the recipes that had not been mentioned in her previous books with Child and Bertholle. In 1979, she published the second volume, New Menus from Simca's Cuisine, with Michael James, who was her student, friend, and assistant since the 1970s. Food and Friends: Recipes and Memories from Simca's Cuisine, her autobiography and last cookbook (with Suzy Patterson), was published in 1991, the year she died.

== Death ==
Simone Beck died on Friday, 20 December 1991, at her home in Châteauneuf-de-Grasse, a small village near Nice. She was 87. Her cousin, Harold Earle said she had been having heart problems for several months and had stopped eating; he stated, "The doctor said that because she wouldn't eat, she died".

== In popular culture ==
- Beck was portrayed by American actress Linda Emond in the 2009 film Julie & Julia.
- Beck was portrayed by Isabella Rossellini in the 2022 comedy television series Julia.

== Bibliography ==
- What's Cooking in France (Ives Washburn, Inc., 1952)
- Le pruneau devant le fourneau: Recettes de cuisine (Louis Moulinié, 1957)
- Mastering the Art of French Cooking Volume 1 co-authored with Julia Child and Louisette Bertholle 1961, ISBN 978-0394721781
- Mastering the Art of French Cooking Volume 2 co-authored with Julia Child) 1970, ISBN 978-0394721774
- Simca's Cuisine: 100 Classic French Recipes for Every Occasion co-authored with Patricia Simon 1972, ISBN 978-0762792986
- New Menus from Simca's Cuisine co-authored with Michael James 1979, ISBN 978-0151652624
- Food and Friends: Recipes and Memories from Simca's Cuisine co-authored with Suzanne Patterson 1991, ISBN 978-0140178173
