= Pot de crème =

Dessert

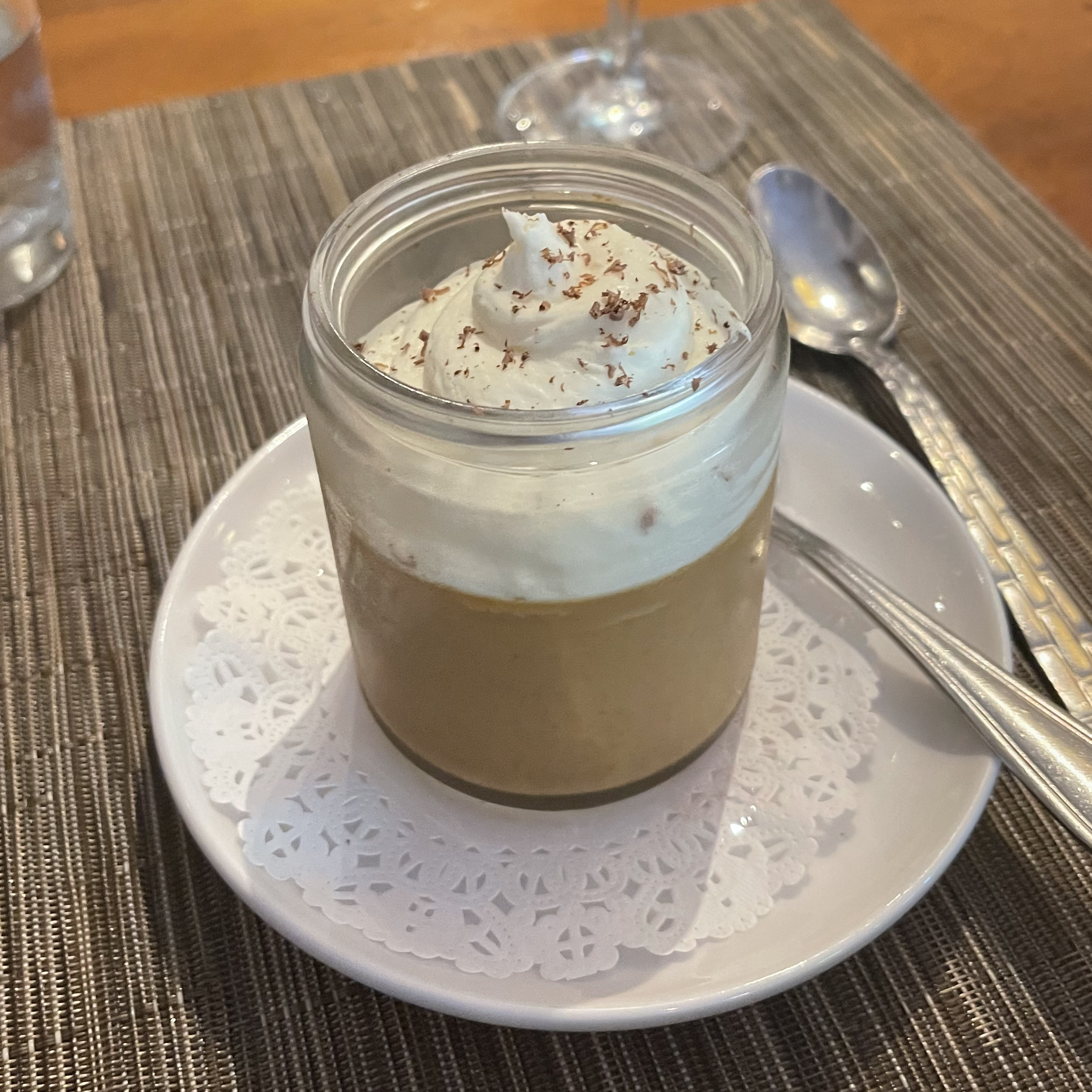
- Butterscotch pot de crème
- Course: Dessert
- Main ingredients: eggs, cream or milk, sugar, flavourings

Pot de crème (/ˈpoʊdəˈkrɛm/ POH-də-KREM; French: [po də kʁɛm]; lit. 'pot of cream'), plural pots de crème (pronounced the same) is a baked custard dessert that resembles a crème brûlée without the layer of hardened caramelised sugar. A basic pot de crème has a rich but neutral flavour, and it is often supplemented with additions like chocolate or coffee. The texture is smooth and delicate; baked until just set, it is served chilled in the dish it was baked in.

Pot de crème is known under several names, including petit pot de crème, cream pot, and in America, baked custard and cup custard.

== Description ==
Pot de crème is a baked custard dessert. The dessert is baked until the custard has just set, giving the dish a delicate, smooth texture. Eggs and cream give pot de crème a rich flavour without any flavours being especially prominent. It is often flavoured with ingredients such as chocolate, coffee or nuts, and is served in the dish it was baked in. This same basic preparation and service in the baking dish is also seen in crème brûlée, which adds a final element of a hardened caramelised sugar top.

== Preparation and serving ==
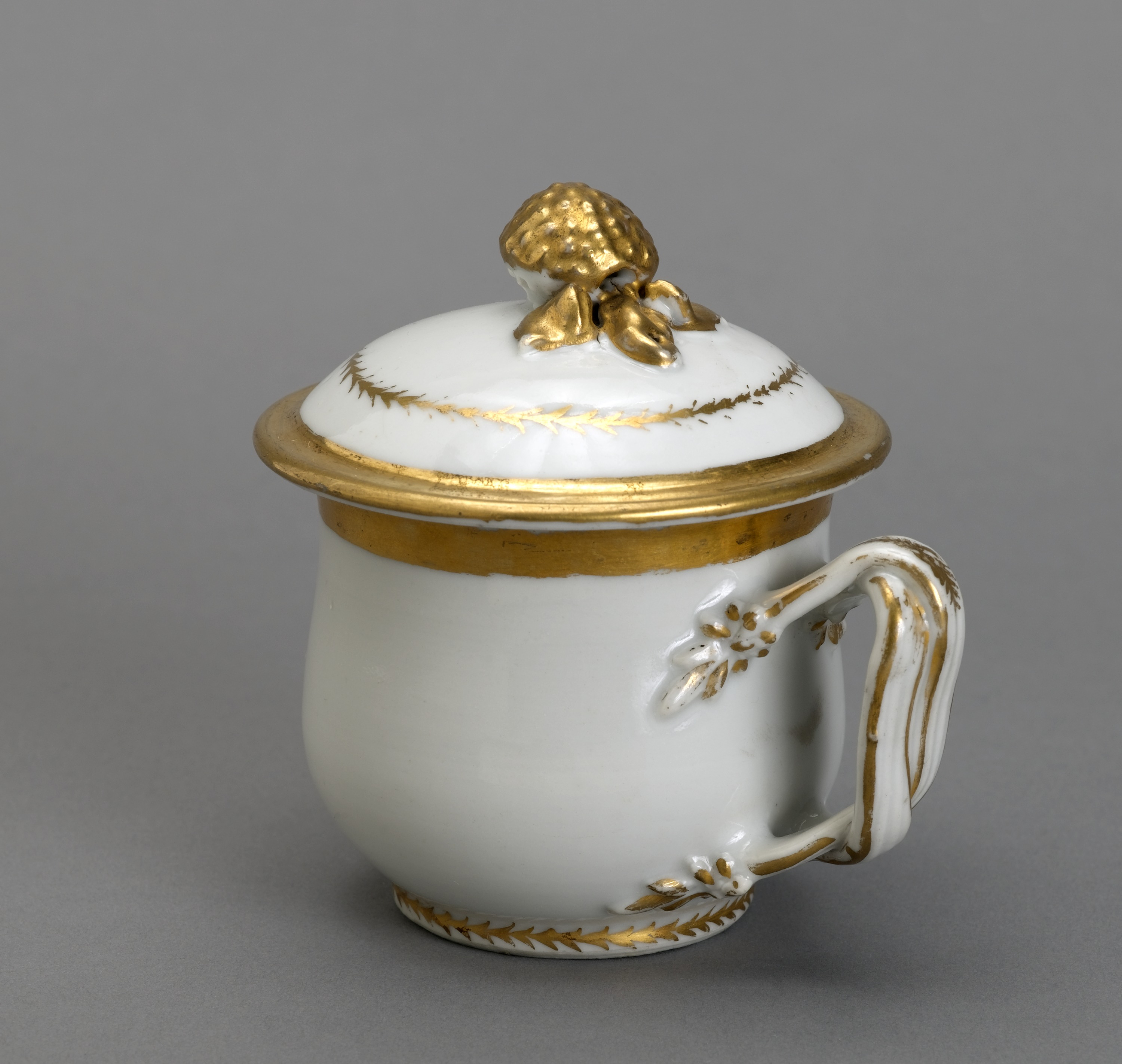
Pot de crème cup and lid, late 18th century

In a typical preparation of pot de crème, cream or milk is scalded—heated to the point just before boiling—and combined with sugar and eggs while avoiding incorporating air. The custard is then portioned into small cups or dishes which are placed in a container and filled with hot water halfway up each dish. The water bath serves to insulate the dishes, which is sometimes furthered by placing a towel between each dish and the container. Some cooks cover the dishes here, using lids from specially-designed pot de crème cups or with plastic wrap that has been punctured in several places.

In the oven, the dishes are cooked slowly in their water bath at around 300–350 °F (149–177 °C), until barely set—about the point where the only part of the custard that moves as the pan is gently shaken is the centre. If air was worked into the liquid during combination, cracks may have appeared as the air expanded in the oven, and without a covering, a crust. Once out of the oven, the pots de crème are quickly removed from their water baths and left to cool, before being covered and refrigerated. Without a covering, they easily pick up smells present in the fridge.

Pots de crème are served cold in the dishes they were baked in. These may be ramekins or specialty pot de crème porcelain cups, fitted with a lid.

== Varieties ==
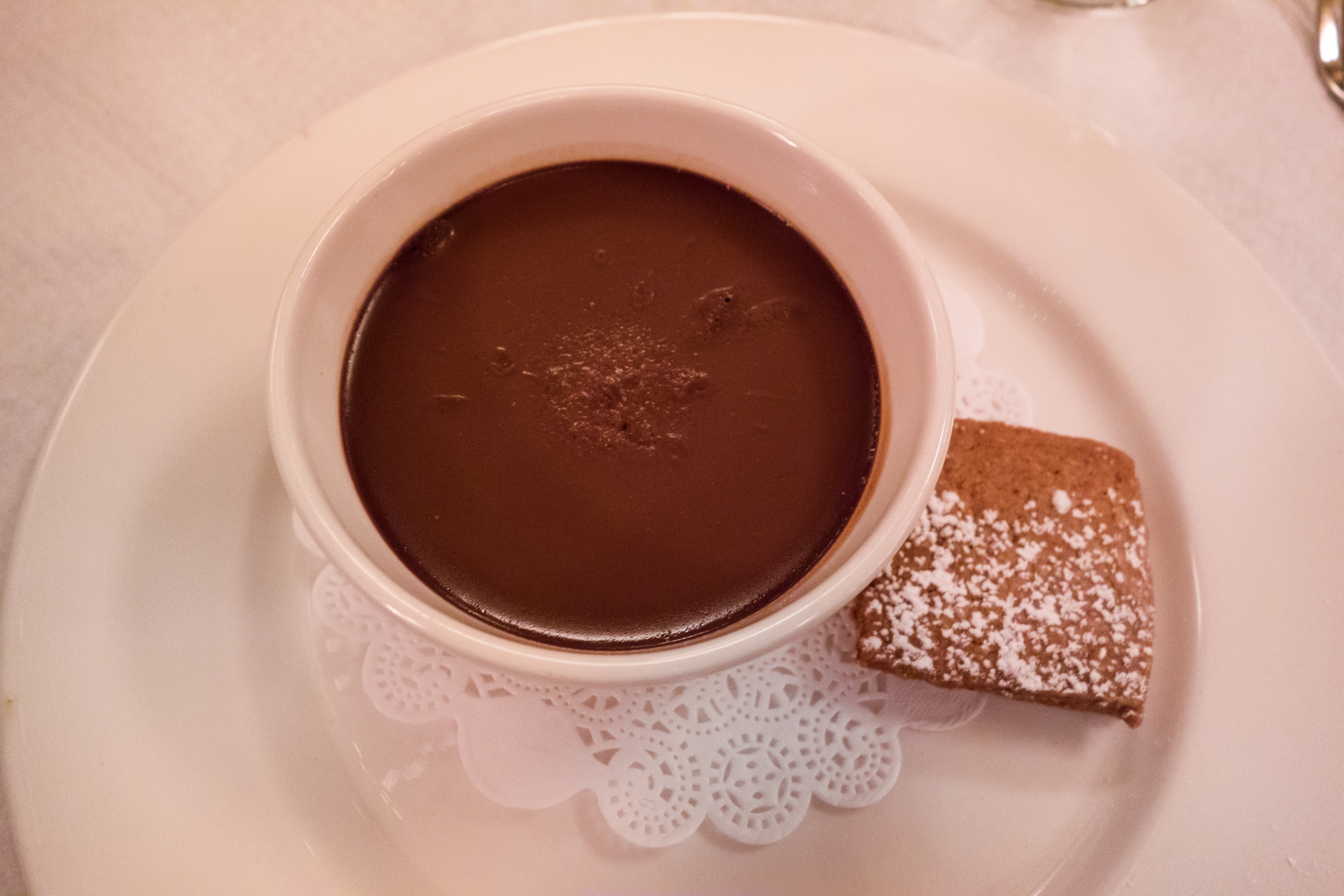
Chocolate pot de crème

The rich flavour of a basic pot de crème comes from the eggs and cream, and lacks any particularly prominent flavours. Flavourings are often added, with vanilla, nuts, coffee and chocolate among the most common.

The inclusion of chocolate in particular has been the subject of commentary: Harold McGee in the revised On Food and Cooking describes a chocolate pot de crème as "essentially a ganache", and Dorie Greenspan describes a popular belief that they are the "culinary siblings" equivalent of chocolate pudding, even as chocolate pot de crème has a reputation as sophisticated and chocolate pudding "homey". The difference between the two is in the method of cooking and inclusion of flour: chocolate pudding includes cornflour, and is cooked on a stove while being stirred. Kyri Claflin also notes in The Oxford Companion to Sugar and Sweets that some chocolate pot de crème dishes served in France are a mousse rather than baked custard.

Several versions of pot de crème are identified in Hering's Dictionary of Classical and Modern Cookery by 1989 in the 10th edition, including toppings of dates, apricot-sauce and orange blossom water (Arabian) and poached pear with chocolate sauce (Héléne). Multiple were decorated with whipped cream, and some included pralin mixed throughout.

== See also ==
- Crème caramel
- List of custard desserts

== Sources ==
- Amendola, Joseph; Rees, Nicole (2003). Understanding Baking: The Art and Science of Baking (3rd ed.). Hoboken: Wiley. ISBN 0-471-40546-9.
- Beverages. Alexandria, Virginia: Time-Life Books. 1983. ISBN 0-8094-2946-2.
- Bickel, Walter (1987). Hering's Dictionary of Classical and Modern Cookery and Practical Reference Manual for the Hotel, Restaurant, and Catering Trade (10th ed.). Giessen: Fachbuchverlag Dr. Pfanneberg & Co. ISBN 3-8057-0298-1.
- Claflin, Kyri (2015). "Mousse". In Goldstein, Darra (ed.). The Oxford Companion to Sugar and Sweets. Oxford: Oxford University Press. ISBN 978-0-199-31339-6.
- Greenspan, Dorie (2006). Baking: From My Home to Yours. New York: Houghton Mifflin Company. ISBN 978-0-618-44336-9.
- McGee, Harold (2004) [1984]. On Food and Cooking: the Science and Lore of the Kitchen (2nd ed.). New York: Scribner. ISBN 978-0-684-80001-1.
- Suas, Michel (2009). Advanced Bread and Pastry: A Professional Approach. Clifton Park, New York: Delamar Cengage Group. ISBN 978-1-4180-1169-7.
