= Soup =

Primarily liquid food

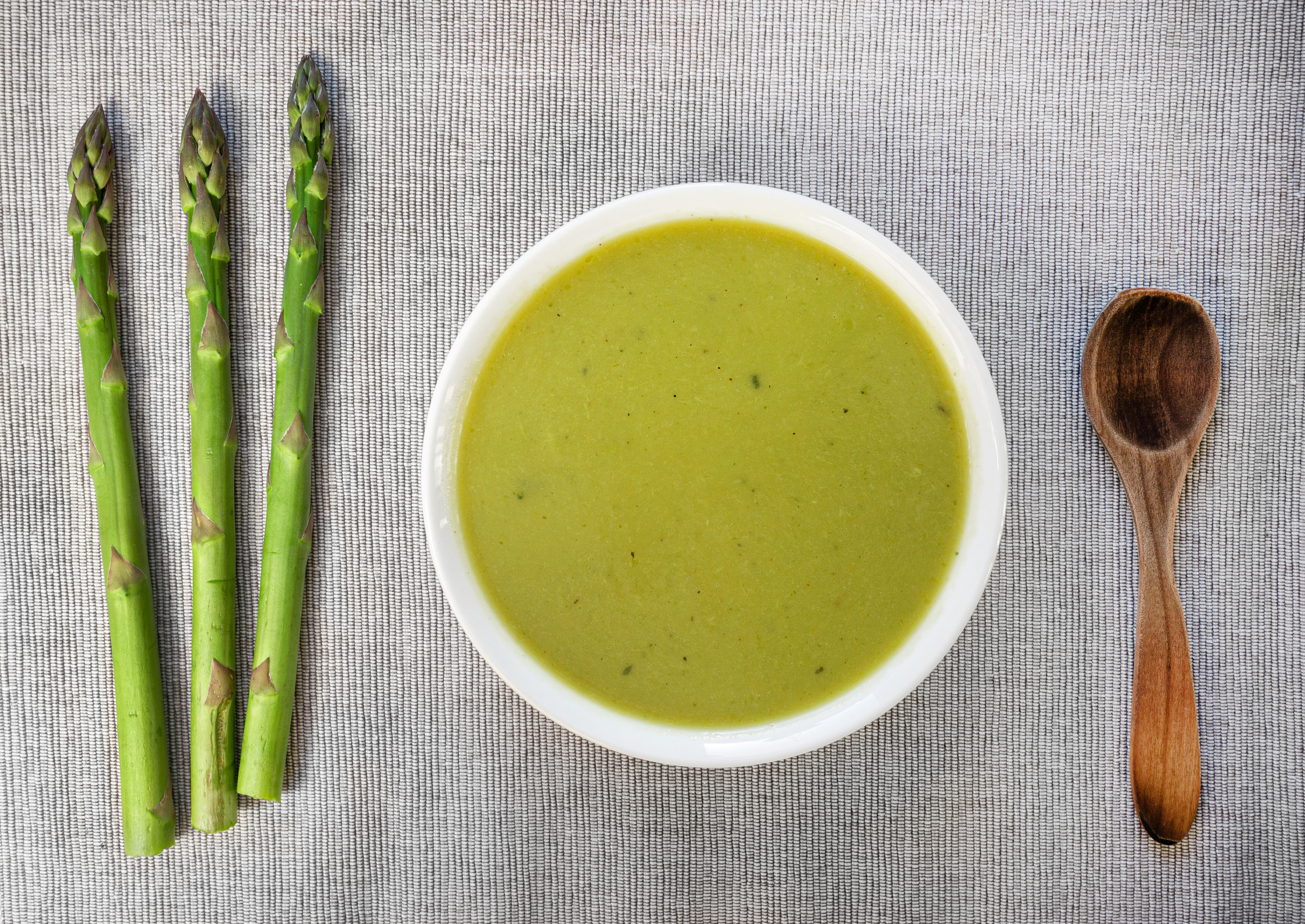
- Asparagus soup
- Main ingredients: Liquid, meat or vegetables
- Variations: Clear soup, thick soup

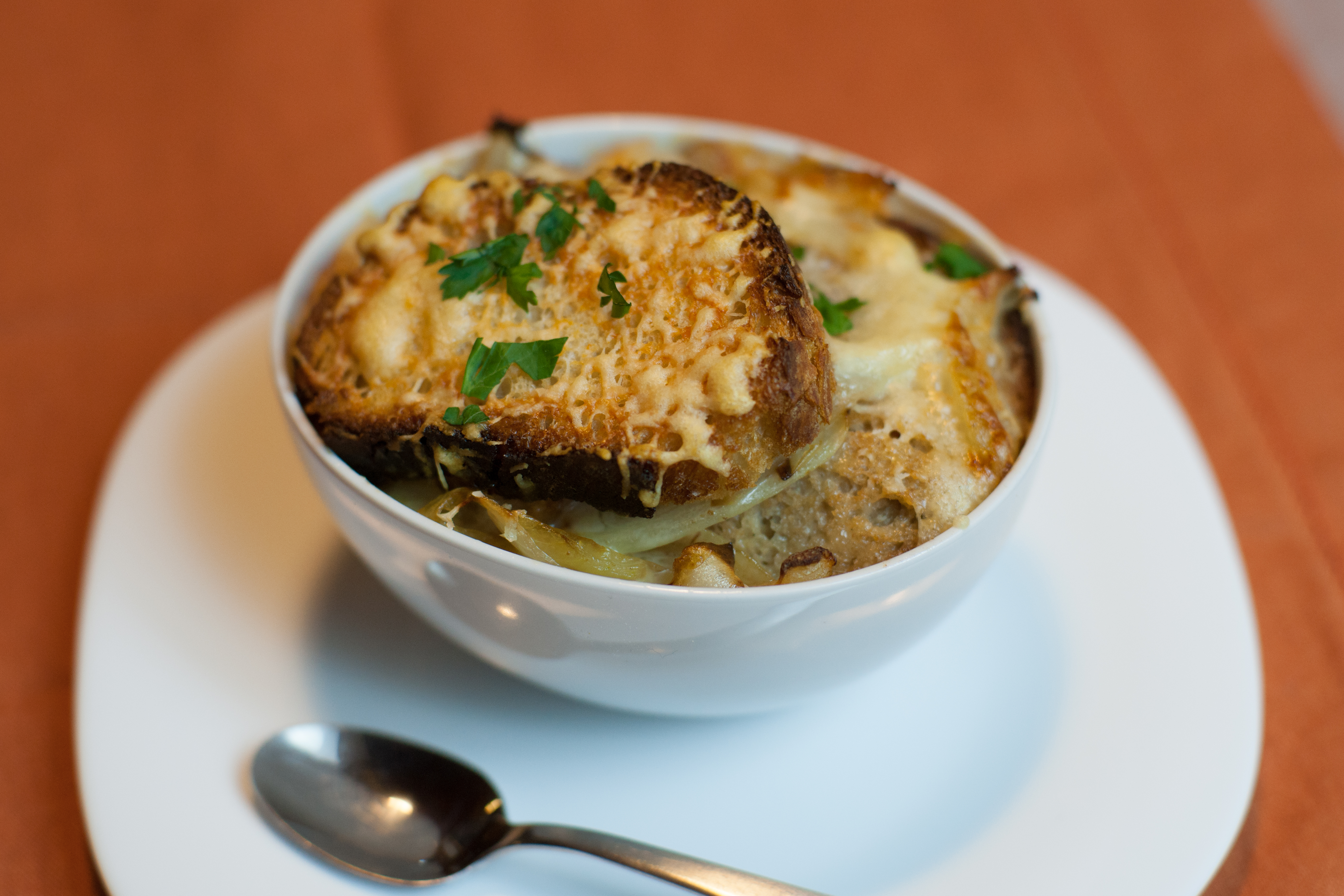
French onion soup

Soup is a primarily liquid food, generally served warm or hot – though it is sometimes served chilled – made by cooking or otherwise combining meat or vegetables with stock, milk, or water. According to The Oxford Companion to Food, soup is the main generic term for liquid savoury dishes; others include broth, bisque, consommé, potage and many more.

The consistency of soups varies from thin to thick: some soups are light and delicate; others are so substantial that they verge on being stews. Soups may be savoury or sweet.

Soups have been made since prehistoric times and have evolved over the centuries. The first soups were made from grains and herbs; later, legumes, other vegetables, meat, or fish were added. Originally, sops referred to pieces of bread covered with savoury liquid; gradually the term soup was transferred to the liquid itself. Soups are common to the cuisines of all continents and have been served at banquets as well as in peasant homes. Soups have been the primary source of nourishment for poor people in many places; in times of hardship soup kitchens have provided sustenance for the hungry.

== Name ==
The term soup, or words like it, can be found in many languages. Similar terms include the Italian zuppa, the German Suppe, the Danish suppe, the Russian суп (pronounced "soup"), the Spanish and Portuguese sopa and the Polish zupa. According to The Oxford Companion to Food, "soup" is "the most general of the terms which apply to liquid savoury dishes"; other terms embraced by soup include broth, bisque, bouillon, consommé, potage, and many more.

According to the lexicographer John Ayto, "the etymological idea underlying the word soup is that of 'soaking'". In his 2012 The Diner's Dictionary Ayto writes that the word dates back to an unrecorded post-classical Latin verb suppare – "to soak", which was derived from the prehistoric Germanic root "sup–", which also produced the English "sup" and "supper". The term passed into Old French as soupe, meaning a piece of bread soaked in liquid" and, by extension, "broth poured on to bread". The earliest recorded use in English of "sop" in the first sense dates from 1340. The ancient conjunction of bread and soup still exists not only in the croutons often served with soup, and the slice of baguette and Gruyère floating on traditional French onion soup, but also in bread-based soups including the German Schwarzbrotsuppe (black bread soup), the Russian Okroshka and the Italian pappa al pomodoro (tomato pulp). The Dictionnaire de l'Académie française records the term "soupe" in French use from the twelfth century but adds that it is probably earlier. (Note: In all its editions from the first (1694) to the eighth (1935) the Dictionnaire de l'Académie française stipulated that soup is served with bread: "a kind of food made of broth and slices of bread" (1694) and "liquid food in which bread is usually soaked" (1935) – sorte d’aliment fait de boüillon & de tranches de pain and aliment liquide dans lequel trempe ordinairement du pain. The current edition distinguishes between the old and the modern meanings of the word: (i) a slice of bread that was drizzled with broth or another liquid (ii) a liquid dish, more or less substantial, which is most often served hot and at the beginning of the meal ((i) une tranche de pain qui a été arrosée de bouillon ou d’un autre aliment liquid; (ii) un plat liquide, plus ou moins conséquent, qui est le plus souvent servi chaud et en début de repas).) The Oxford English Dictionary records the use of the word in English in the fourteenth century: "Soppen nim wyn & sucre & make me an stronge soupe". The first known cookery book in English, The Forme of Cury, c. 1390, refers to several "broths", but not to soups.

The Oxford Companion to Food (OCF) comments that soups can "stray, over what is necessarily an imprecisely demarcated frontier", into the realm of stews. The Companion adds that this tendency is noticeable among fish soups such as bouillabaisse. The Hungarian goulash is regarded by many as a stew but by others, particularly in Hungary, as a soup (Gulyás). The food writer Harold McGee contrasts soups with sauces in On Food and Cooking, commenting that they can be so similar that soups may only be distinguished as less intensely flavoured, permitting them to be "eaten as a food in themselves, not an accent."

== History ==
=== Prehistory ===
Before the invention of boiling in water, cooking was limited to simple heating and roasting. The making of soup or something akin has been dated by some writers back to the Upper Palaeolithic (between 50,000 and 12,000 years ago). Some archaeologists conjecture that early humans employed hides and watertight baskets to boil liquids. According to a study by the academic Garritt C. Van Dyk, the first soup may have been made by Neanderthals, boiling animal bones and drinking the broth. Archaeological evidence for bone broths has been found in sites from Egypt to China.

=== Ancient times and later ===
In 1988 the food writer M. F. K. Fisher commented, "It is impossible to think of any good meal, no matter how plain or elegant, without soup or bread in it. It is almost as hard to find any recorded menu, ancient or modern, without one or both". Methods of making soup evolved from one culture to another. The first soups were made from grains and herbs; later, peas, beans, other vegetables, pasta, meat or fish were added. In her 2010 work Soup: A Global History, Janet Clarkson writes that the ancient Romans had a great variety of soups. De re coquinaria (On the Subject of Cooking), a collection of Roman recipes compiled in the fourth or fifth century from earlier manuscripts gives details of numerous ingredients, mostly vegetable.

Open-air soup cooking, by Bartolomeo Scappi, 1570

In European and Arab cuisines soups continued to feature after the fall of the Roman Empire. Clarkson writes that the earliest known German cookery book, the Buch von guter Spise (Book of Good Food) published in about 1345, includes recipes for many soups, including one made with beer and caraway seeds, another with leeks, almond milk and rice meal, others with carrots and almond milk or goose cooked in broth with garlic and saffron. The early fifteenth-century French book Du fait de cuisine (From the Kitchen) has many recipes for potages and "sops" including several regional variants.

During the seventeenth century the soup itself, rather than the "sops" it contained, became seen as the most important element of the dish. One of the most famous cookery books of its time was Robert May's The Accomplisht Cook (1660). Clarkson comments that about a fifth of May's recipes are for soups of one kind or another.

The Huangdi Neijing, a Chinese medicinal text, describes the preparation of soups and clear liquids by steaming rice, and recommends soups as medicine.

In the eighteenth century, meals at grand European tables were still served in the style that had persisted since the Middle Ages, with successive courses of three or four dishes placed on the table simultaneously and then replaced by three or more contrasting dishes. Soup was typically part of the first course. Exceptionally, at particularly grand dinners, a first course might consist of four different soups, succeeded by four dishes of fish and then four of meat. (Note: For a dinner given by the Prince Regent in 1817, Antonin Carême served a first course of Potage à la Monglas, Garbure aux choux, Potage d'orge perlée à la Crécy and Potage de poisons à la russe (respectively, a brown cream soup with foie gras and truffles, rustic vegetable broth with cabbage, a delicate purée of pearl barley and carrots, and Russian style fish soup).) In the early nineteenth century a new style of dining became fashionable in Europe and elsewhere: service à la russe – Russian-style service: dishes were served one at a time, usually beginning with soup.

=== Soup for the poor ===
Soup-kitchen in Dublin, 1847

In the OCF Alan Davidson writes that although soup is now typically served as the first of several courses in western menus, in many places around the world substantial soups have historically been an entire meal for poorer people, particularly in rural areas. Many Russian peasants subsisted on rye bread and soup made from pickled cabbage.

Charitable soup-kitchens preparing soup and supplying it to the needy, either free or at a very low charge, were known in the Middle East in the sixteenth century. From the late eighteenth century, soup-kitchens (in German Suppenküche, in French, soupes populaires) were set up in Germany, France, England and elsewhere. In the 1840s the chef Alexis Soyer established a soup-kitchen in the East End of London to feed Huguenot silk weavers impoverished by cheap imports. During the Irish famine, which began in 1845, he set up a kitchen in Dublin capable of feeding a thousand people an hour.

In the United States soup-kitchens were set up in the 1870s. During the Great Depression, Al Capone established and sponsored a soup-kitchen in Chicago. In the same period the Salvation Army ran similar operations elsewhere in the US and in Canada, Australia and Britain.

== Regional cuisines ==
=== Asia ===
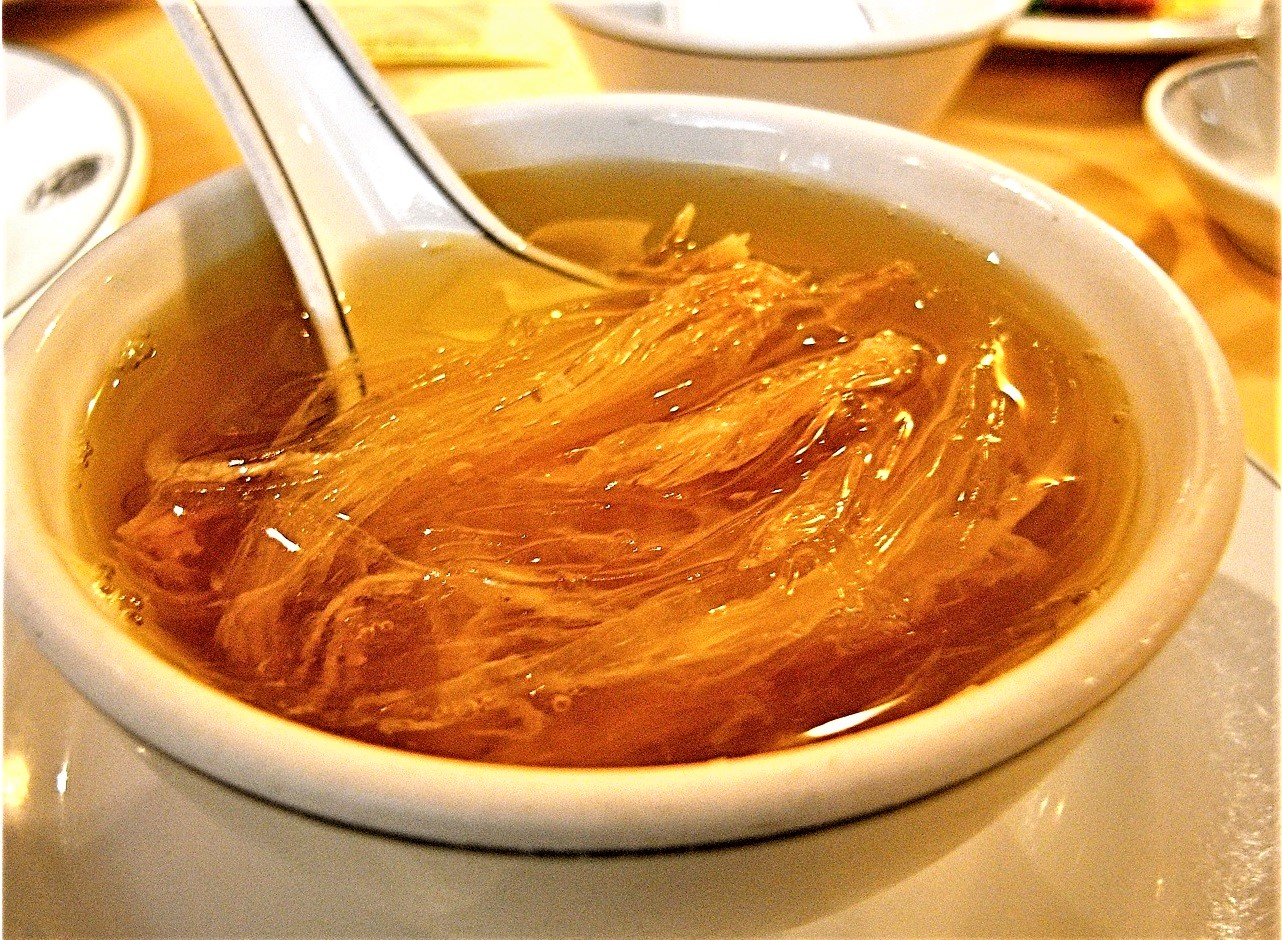
Chinese shark fin soup

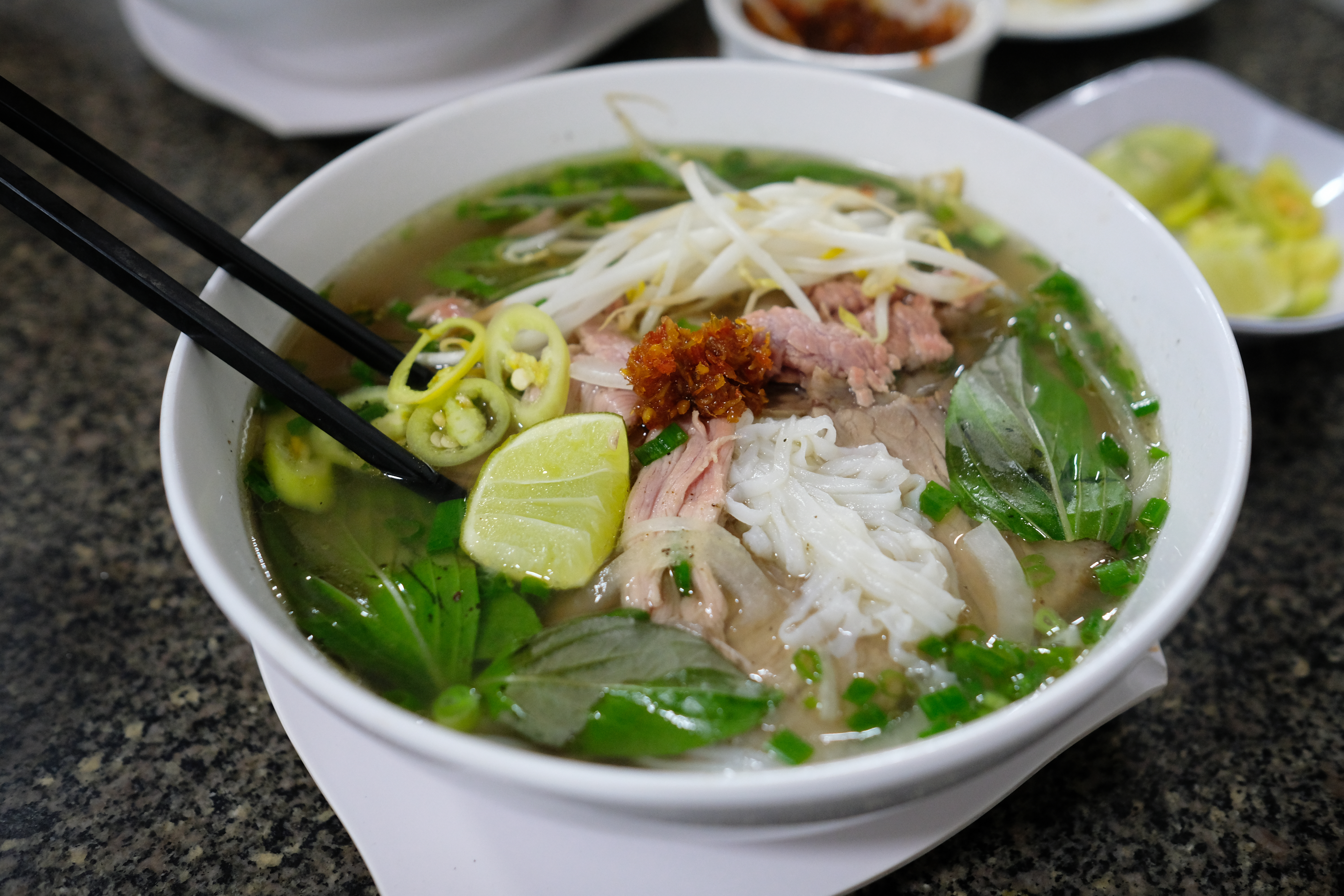
Vietnamese pho

In Asian countries soup became a familiar breakfast dish, but has not, according to Clarkson, done so in the West. (Note: Nevertheless, the creator of vichyssoise, Louis Diat recalled in his memoirs, published in 1961: "Casting about one day for a new cold soup, I remembered how maman used to cool our breakfast soup, on a warm morning, by adding cold milk to it. A cup of cream, an extra straining, and a sprinkle of chives, et voila, I had my new soup. I named my version of maman's soup after Vichy, the famous spa located not twenty miles from our Bourbonnais home, as a tribute to the fine cooking of the region".) In China and Japan, soup came to have a different place in meals. As in the west, there was a distinction between thick and thin soups, but the latter would often be treated as a beverage, to be drunk from the bowl rather than eaten with a spoon. In Japan miso soup became the best known of the thick type, with many variations on the basic theme of dashi, a stock made from kombu (edible seaweed) and dried fermented tuna, with miso (fermented soy bean) paste. Clarkson writes, "Miso soup is the traditional breakfast soup in the ordinary home, and the traditional end to a formal banquet". Ramen, a noodle soup, popular in Japan and latterly internationally, is documented only from the second half of the nineteenth century.

In China, soups wholly unknown in the west were developed, including bird's nest and shark's fin soups. Snake soup continues to be an iconic tradition in Cantonese culture, and that of Hong Kong. In China, rat soup is considered the equal of oxtail soup.

Indian cuisine includes rasam (sometimes called pepper-water), a thin, spicy soup, typically made with lentils, tomatoes, and seasonings including tamarind, pepper, and chillies. In Thai cuisine gaeng chud are soups: the most popular are tom yum kung made with prawns and tom khaa gai made from galangal, chicken and coconut milk. Pho is a Vietnamese soup, usually made from beef stock and spices with noodles and thinly sliced beef or chicken added. In Filipino cookery sinigang is a soup made with meat, shrimp, or fish and flavoured with a sour ingredient such as tamarind or guava; also from the Philippines is caldereta, a goat soup. The soups of Indonesia include soto ayam (chicken), sop udang (shrimp with rice vermicelli) and sop kepiting (crab). Garudhiya is a soup served in the Maldives, with chunks of tuna in it.

Two soups from Armenia are a cucumber and yoghurt soup called jajik, and bozbash, containing lamb and fruit; dyushbara is a dumpling soup from Azerbaijan; Tibetan cooking includes tsamsuk, made from grains, butter, soya and cheese. An Iranian summer soup, mast-o khiar, is made with yoghurt, cucumber, and mint. Turkish kelle-paça is made from the meat from animal heads and feet. Tarhana, one of the oldest traditional Turkish soups, is made by mixing and fermenting yoghurt, cereal flours and a variety of cooked vegetables, producing a soup with a sour and acidic tang and a yeasty flavour. Also from Turkey is Yayla çorbasi, a yoghurt soup with rice or barley. Like chicken soup it has curative properties ascribed to it by some.

=== Europe ===
From the sixteenth century onwards, Paris was known for its street vendors selling soup, (Note: Soup was marketed as a "restorative" – aliment qui restaure. In 1765, according to Prosper Montagné's Larousse Gastronomique, a Parisian entrepreneur opened a shop specialising in soups, sold as "magical restoratives". This prompted the use of the modern word restaurant to refer to eating establishments.) and in mid-nineteenth-century Paris, Les Halles, the large central food market, became known for its stalls selling onion soup with a substantial topping of grated cheese, put under a grill and served au gratin. This gratinée des Halles transcended class distinctions, becoming the breakfast of the forts des Halles – the workers responsible for transporting the goods – and a restorative for the party people leaving the cabarets of Paris late at night.

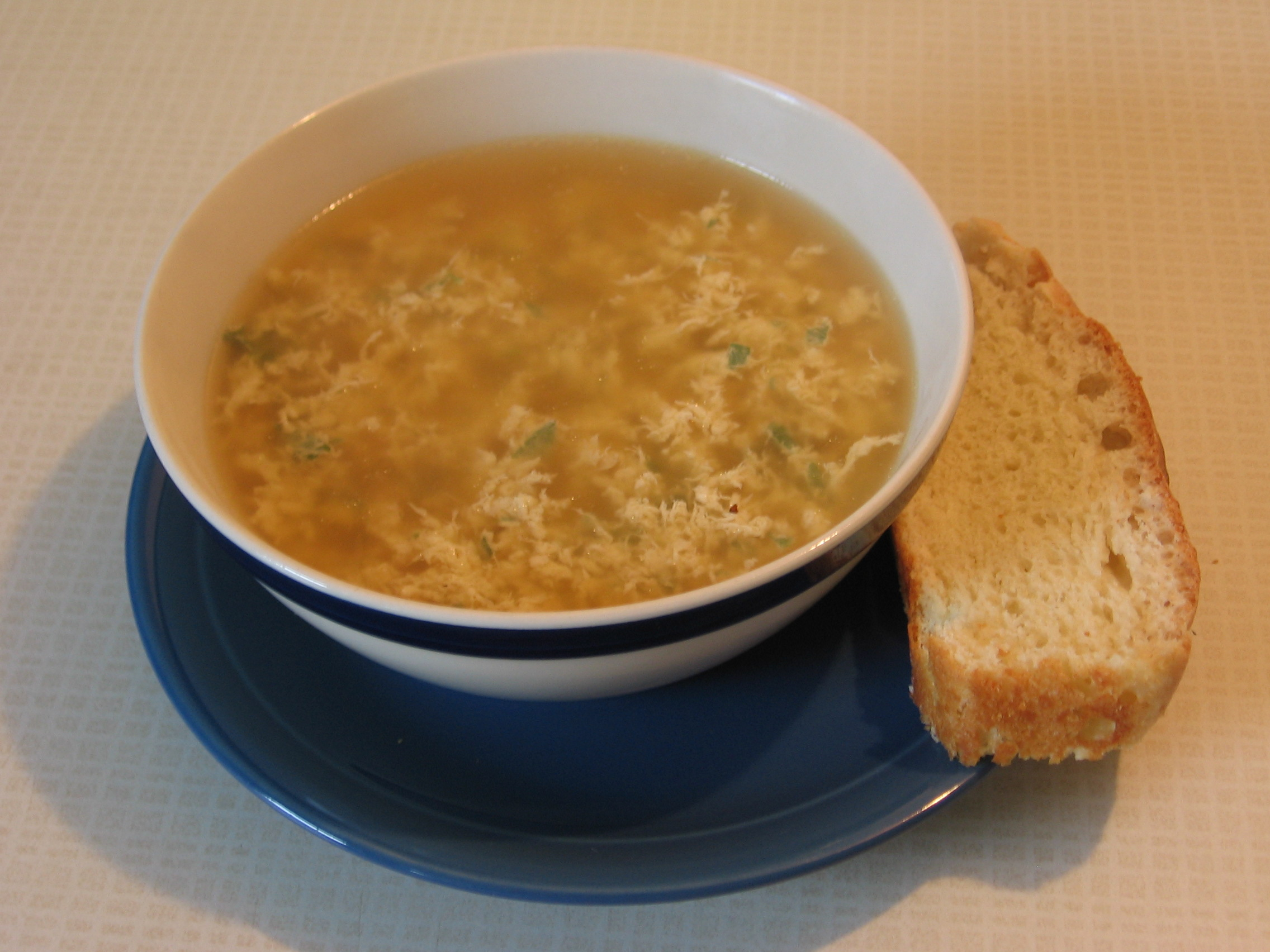
Italian stracciatella

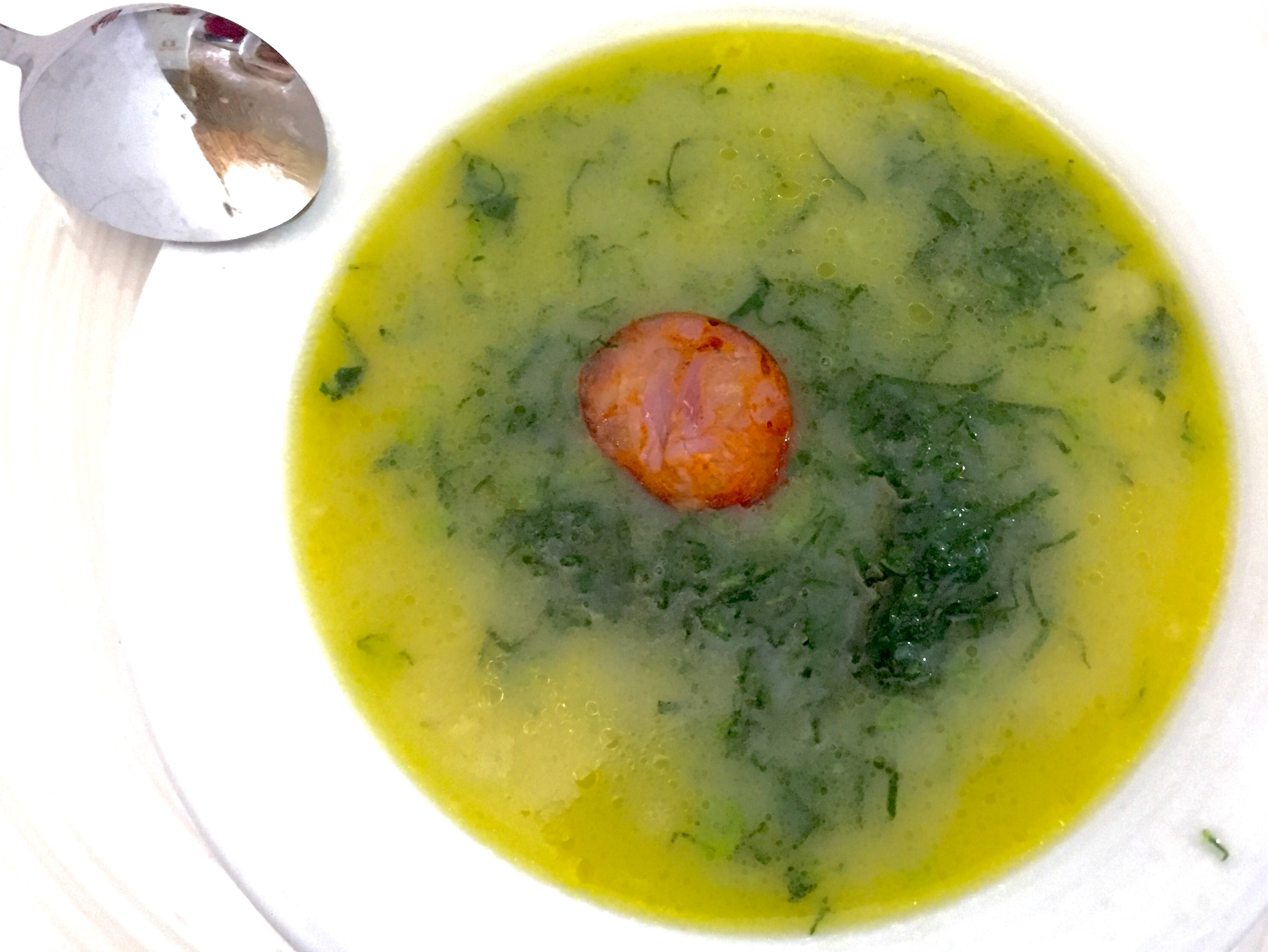
Portuguese caldo verde

The many cuisines of Europe have a wide range of soups. Among the soups of Italy are minestrone, zuppa pavese and straciatella, respectively a vegetable broth, consommé with poached eggs, and a meat broth with eggs and cheese. From Belgium there are potage liégeois – a pea and bean soup – and soupe tchantches, a vegetable soup with fine vermicelli and milk. Bulgarian cuisine includes tarator, a cold yoghurt and cucumber soup. Dutch soups include erwtensoep – a split pea soup – and bruinebonensoep, a brown bean soup eaten with rye bread and bacon. A soup from the Faeroe Islands is raskjøt, made with dried mutton. Erbensuppe mit Schweinsohren, is a German split pea soup with pig's ear. Zivju supa, a Latvian fish soup incorporates whole pieces of cooked fish with potato; The Finnish kesäkeitto is a light summer soup of seasonal vegetables cooked in milk and water; the Swedish köttsoppa is a meat and vegetable soup; the Norwegian blomkålspuré is cauliflower soup with egg yolks and cream. Gehäck, from Luxembourg, is made with pork offal, and finished with prunes soaked in local white wine.

Maltese soups include soppa tal-armla ("widow's soup"), made with green and white vegetables and garnished with a poached egg and cheese, and aljotta a light fish soup flavoured with garlic and marjoram. Two soups from Poland are chlodnik, a crayfish and beetroot soup, served chilled and grochowka, yellow-pea soup with barley. Portuguese soups include canja (chicken) and caldo verde (potato and cabbage). Cullen skink (smoked haddock soup) and nettle soup are of Scottish origin. A Welsh soup, cawl, is typically made with lamb or beef together with vegetables including potatoes, swedes and carrots. Slovenian cuisine includes juha, a meat and vegetable soup. Russian soups include schi (cabbage soup), solyanka (vegetable soup with meat or fish), rassolnik (pickled cucumber soup), and ukha (fish soup).

=== Africa ===
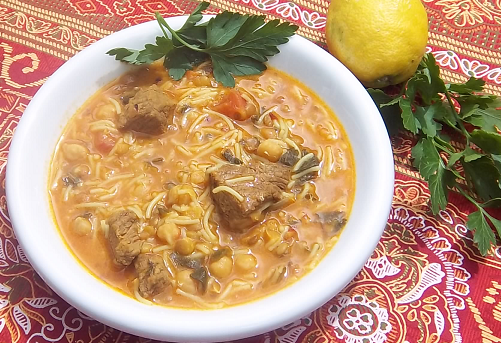
Moroccan harira

Arab shorba typically contains meat and oats; Egyptian food includes melokhia, a soup of jute leaves and meat. The Moroccan harira contains chickpeas, meat and rice. In Nigeria, according to Davidson, "soupy stews or stewlike soups" are popular. He gives as examples egusi soup, often made with offal, palm oil, carob, lemon basil, and egusi powder, and various okra soups. He adds that in Nigeria soup made from goat is "so important that it is usually served at the most important functions". In A Safari of African Cooking (1971) Bill Odarty also highlights goat soup from Liberia. Other Nigerian soups include the spinach-based soup Efo. A study in 2025 reported that despite their nutritional richness and cultural importance, traditional soups were declining in popularity, particularly among younger generations and in urban areas.

Soups from other parts of Africa include Cheruba – a lamb and vegetable soup with lima beans or chickpeas – from north Africa; a West African speciality is groundnut soup. Abenkwan, from West Africa, is a soup of crab meat, pulped palm nuts and lamb. East African cuisine includes bean soup with tomato, onion, pepper and curry powder. Supuya papai, from Tanzania, is a cream soup containing papaya and onion. A Congolese green papaya soup is made with bacon fat, chicken broth, milk and red pepper. South African soups include curried snoek head soup. A 2014 study records a Ghanaian saying, "I haven’t eaten if I don't have my soup and fufu" (a dough of pounded cocoyam or cassava). The soup is typically based on okra.

=== The Americas and Australasia ===
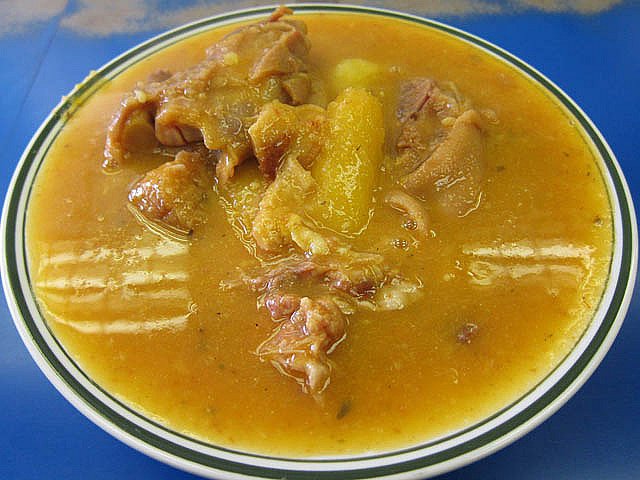
Honduran mondongo

Soups from the Americas include a spiny lobster soup from Belize, Cajun crayfish bisque, and gumbo, a hearty soup (or stew) traditionally made from meat or shellfish with tomatoes, vegetables, herbs, and spices, thickened with okra. In the Caribbean and Latin America sancocho is a thick soup typically consisting of meat, tubers, and other vegetables. Callalloo soups are found in the West Indies and Brazil.

A Brazilian favourite is Moqueca de camarão, a broth of tomato and coconut with shrimps: one food writer comments "locals eat steaming bowls on even the hottest days". Ajiaco Santaferenio is a Colombian avocado soup), and Mexico has a black bean soup. Chupe de camarones, a Peruvian soup, is a chowder of shrimp and chilli pepper and is reputedly an aphrodisiac. Honduras, the US and Mexico all have a tripe soup, respectively mondongo, pepper pot soup, and menudo. The Mexican sopa de alb digas is a meatball soup.

Soups from the US include the clam chowder of New England, which has entered the international culinary repertoire, an American regional favourite, Maryland crab soup, and cream of corn soup, which became popular in California during the 1980s.

Australasian soups include two from New Zealand: toheroa (clam) and kumara (sweet potato and chilli). Davidson remarks favourably on the Australian wallabi-tail soup.

== Classification ==
In the western cuisine of the twentieth and twenty-first centuries there have been and are numerous soups. Auguste Escoffier divided them into two main types:

- Clear soups, which include plain and garnished consommés
- Thick soups, which comprise the purées, veloutés, and creams

He added, "A third class, which is independent of either of the above, in that it forms part of plain, household cookery, embraces vegetable soups and garbures or gratinéd soups. But in important dinners – by this I mean rich dinners – only the first two classes are recognised".

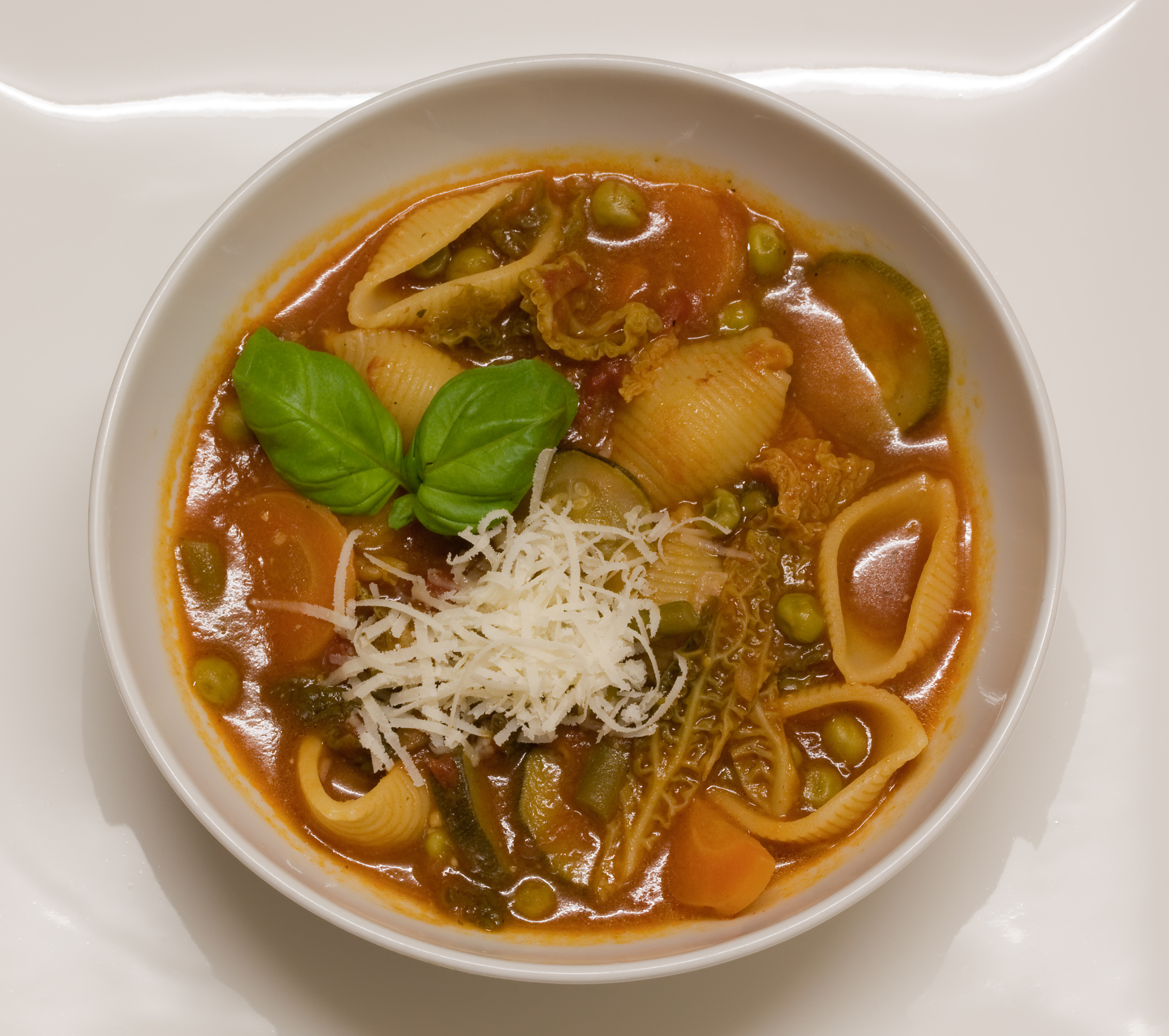
Minestrone

Louis Saulnier's Le Répertoire de la cuisine, first published in 1914, contains six pages of details of potages (clear soups), two pages on soupes (moistened with water, milk or thin white stock), eight pages on veloutés (soups thickened with egg yolks) and crèmes (thickened with double cream), as well as a further three pages on fifty-three "Potages étrangers" – foreign soups – including borscht from the Russian Empire, clam chowder from the United States, cock-a-leekie from Scotland, minestrone from Italy, mock turtle from England, and mulligatawny from British India.

The French distinction between clear and thick soups is echoed in other languages: in German Klare Suppen and Gebundene Suppen; in Italian Brodi and Zuppe; and in Spanish Sopas claras and Sopas spessas. Many soups are fundamentally the same in the cuisines of various countries, with minor local variations. Oxtail soup, a familiar item in British and American cooking, is one of several oxtail soups from round the world, including one from Sichuan, others from Austria (Ochsenschleppsuppe), Jamaica, South Africa and France (potage bergére – oxtail consommé thickened with tapioca, garnished with asparagus and diced mushrooms). Chicken soups have been common to numerous cuisines since ancient times: they featured in east Asian cooking more than 5,000 years ago, and were considered therapeutic in pharaonic Egypt, the Roman Empire, Persia and biblical Israel. (Note: Chicken soup has acquired the nickname "Jewish penicillin" from its frequent use as food for invalids.) Modern variants are found from Japan (tori no suimono) to Portugal (canja), Colombia (ajiaco) and France (consommé de volaille).

Elizabeth David comments in French Provincial Cooking (1960), "No doubt because the tin and the package have become so universal, people are astonished by the true flavours of a well-balanced home-made soup and demand more helpings if only to make sure that their noses and palates are not deceiving them". In their Mastering the Art of French Cooking (1961), Simone Beck, Louisette Bertholle and Julia Child write:

a good home-made soup in these days of the tin opener is almost a unique and always a satisfying experience. Most soups are uncomplicated to make, and the major portion of them can be prepared several hours before serving.

== Cold soups ==
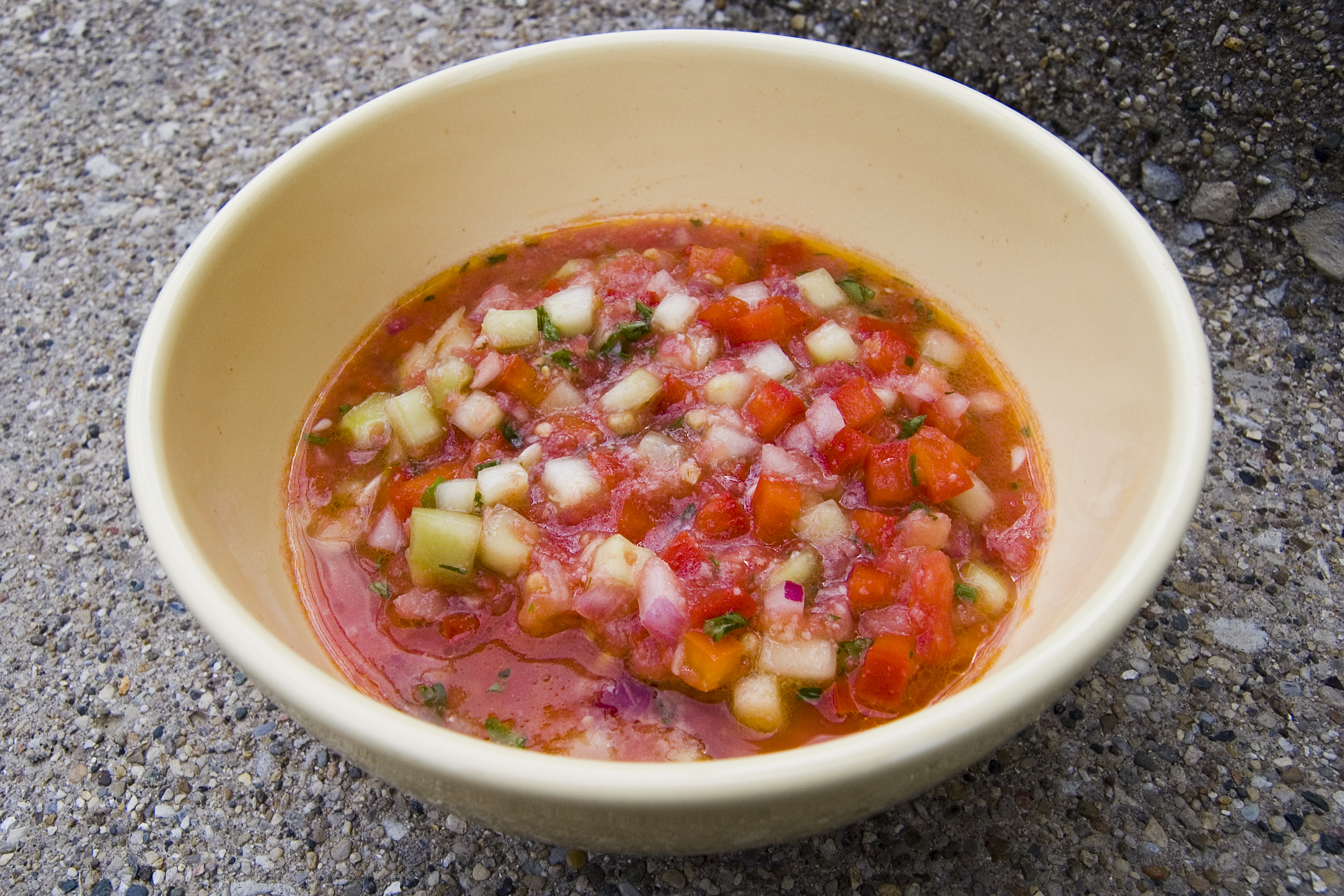
Gazpacho

Cold soups are a particular variation on the traditional soup. Two well-known chilled soups are the Franco-American vichyssoise and the Spanish gazpacho. The Oxford English Dictionary defines the former as "A soup made with potatoes, leeks, and cream, usually served chilled", and the latter as "A cold Spanish vegetable soup consisting of onions, cucumbers, pimentos, etc., chopped very small with bread and put into a bowl of oil, vinegar, and water".

== Sweet soups ==
Many ancient cuisines developed versions of fruit soup: either fruits were added to a grain-based pottage or the soup consisted mostly of fruit flavoured with various spices. The soups were made from whatever fruit was ready for harvest locally or from dried fruit. Fruit soups remain well known in Germany and Nordic countries: although they may sometimes be served at the beginning of a meal they are sweet dishes. Davidson instances rødgrød, also known as rote Grütze, a red berry soup popular in Denmark, other parts of Scandinavia and Germany, sitruunakeitto, a creamy lemon soup from Finland, and the Middle Eastern khoshab, made with dried fruits. Other fruits used to make sweet soups include apples, blueberries, cherries, gooseberries, rhubarb and rose-hips.

== Sour soups ==
Davidson mentions a category, "sour soups", important in northern, eastern and central Europe. Some have a fermented beer base or use sauerkraut, while others are soured with vinegar, pickled beetroot, lemon or yoghurt. Examples include sinigang, chorba, a meat and vegetable soup found in many countries of eastern Europe, north Africa and Asia, and sop ikan pedas, a fish soup from Indonesia. Żurek, from Poland, is a sour bread soup based not on meat or vegetable stock but on fermented cereal such as rye. According to a Polish cookery book, "it is always sour, salty, and creamy at the same time".

== Portable, tinned and dried soups ==
Food preservation has, in Clarkson's phrase, "always been a preoccupation of the human animal", allowing food to be kept for long periods. In her Domestic Cookery (1806), Maria Rundell gave a recipe for "Portable Soup – a very useful thing" – highly concentrated meat stock that set to a solid consistency: for a bowl of soup it was only necessary to dissolve some in hot water. By the beginning of the nineteenth century the Royal Navy had been victualling its ships with portable soup for some years. Recipes were published under many names; Clarkson lists "veal glew", "cake soup", "cake gravey", "broth cakes", "solid soop", "portmanteau pottage", "pocket soup", "carry soup and "soop always in readiness".

In 1810 Peter Durand, an English inventor, was granted a patent for the first tin can for soup. The first commercial canning factory opened in England in 1813; it had a capacity of only six cans an hour; each can was cut by hand, filled and the lid soldered on individually. With advances in technology the canning of food had expanded by the end of the century and companies such as Heinz were promoting their soups as gourmet products indistinguishable from home-made versions. Canning made soup readily available, easily transportable, long-lasting and convenient.

=== Condensed ===
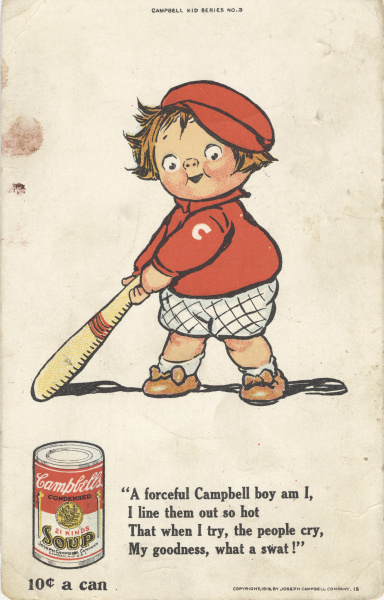
Advertisement for Campbell's soup, c. 1913

In 1897, Heinz's rival Campbell's introduced condensed canned soups, to be diluted with water to produce double the volume. (Note: To sell condensed soup at low prices, Campbell's management drove down costs by automating production as much as possible and applying anti-union policies against the workforce.) Tomato soup was not popular in the US or Britain until Campbell's began marketing it.

Condensed soups became ubiquitous in middle-class American households in the 1960s as a convenience food.

=== Dried ===
Drying is one of the oldest methods of preserving food, and in the nineteenth century Soyer praised commercially dried vegetables as a good ingredient of soldiers' soup during the Crimean War. Dried soups remained in military use into the 1950s, but it was not until the mid-twentieth century that manufacturers began extensively marketing them for domestic use. The Good Nutrition Guide (2008) commented, "Although many types of processed soup have been criticised for their salt levels, packet soups are by far the worst". Subsequently, some manufacturers have experimented with reduced-salt packet soups. A trial in France in 2012 found that reducing salt in chicken noodle soup by more than thirty per cent did not affect consumers' liking for the product.

The Mock Turtle in Alice's Adventures in Wonderland

== Literature, screen and stage ==
Soups and sops are frequently encountered in literature. In the King James Bible, Jesus identifies his forthcoming betrayer: "'He it is, to whom I shall give a sop, when I have dipped it'. And when he had dipped the sop, he gave it to Judas." (Note: In the New English Bible, this is given as "'It is the man to whom I give this piece of bread when I have dipped it in the dish'. Then, after dipping it in the dish, he took it out and gave it to Judas".) Stone Soup, an old folk tale, tells of soup produced by travellers who have no food and promise to feed the inhabitants of a village who contribute what they have to a cauldron which at first contains only a stone but is quickly added to by the villagers, making a tasty soup for everyone.

The figurative use of "milksop" – literally bread dipped in milk – to mean a feeble, timid or ineffectual person is found in Chaucer's The Canterbury Tales and Shakespeare's Richard III. In Jane Austen's Pride and Prejudice, Mr Bingley is kept waiting to announce his forthcoming ball until his cook has made enough white soup, a soup containing veal stock and almonds, much favoured for dances at the time. One of Lewis Carroll's best-known characters, the Mock Turtle, who owes his name to the eponymous soup, sings a song that begins "Beautiful Soup, so rich and green/ Waiting in a hot tureen!" In Isak Dinesen's 1958 story "Babette's Feast", turtle soup is the first course of a magnificent dinner.

Soup is frequently mentioned in films and on television. Though the foodstuff plays no part in the action, Duck Soup is used as the title of a 1927 film by Laurel and Hardy and a 1933 film by the Marx Brothers. (Note: "Duck soup" was an American slang expression meaning an easy task (possibly alluding to "a sitting duck" as an easy target).) In Alfred Hitchcock's 1972 film Frenzy, Mrs Oxford serves her nonplussed husband a soup containing "smelts, ling, conger eel, John Dory, pilchards and frogfish". In the 1990s a character dubbed "the Soup Nazi" appeared in Seinfeld, an American television comedy series: his magnificent soup-making was offset by his bullying manner. Tortilla Soup is a 2001 film comedy about a retired restaurateur and his family's love of food.

In the theatre, Chicken Soup with Barley is the title of a 1956 stage play by Arnold Wesker. (Note: Chicken soup with barley, a traditional Jewish dish, is served in the first act of Wesker's play in a family kitchen in the East End of London.) A later stage play was the comedy There's a Girl in My Soup, in which, again, the actual soup is purely nominal; it ran in the West End for 2,547 performances between 1966 and 1969.

== Gallery ==
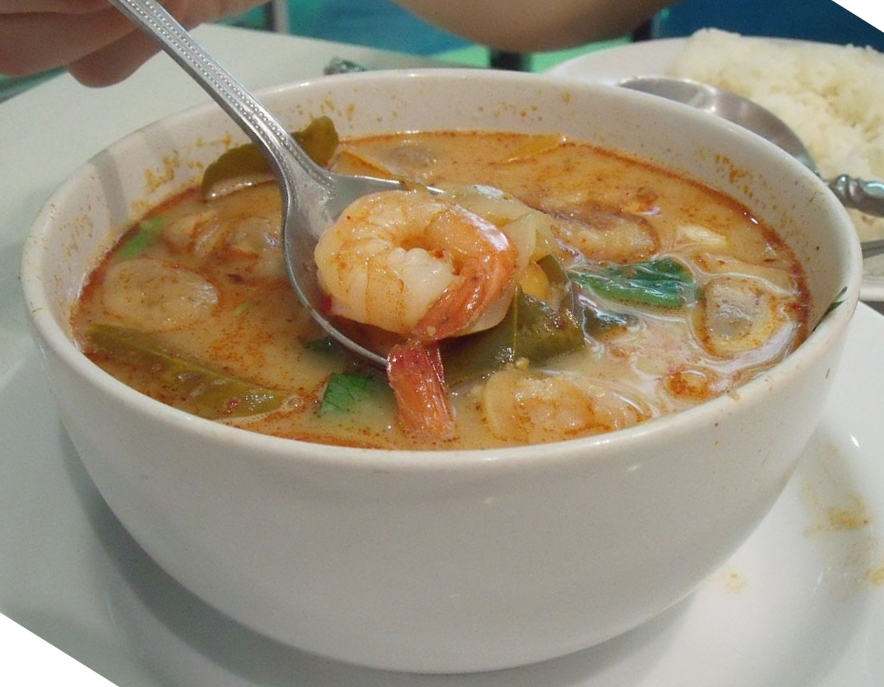
Tom yum

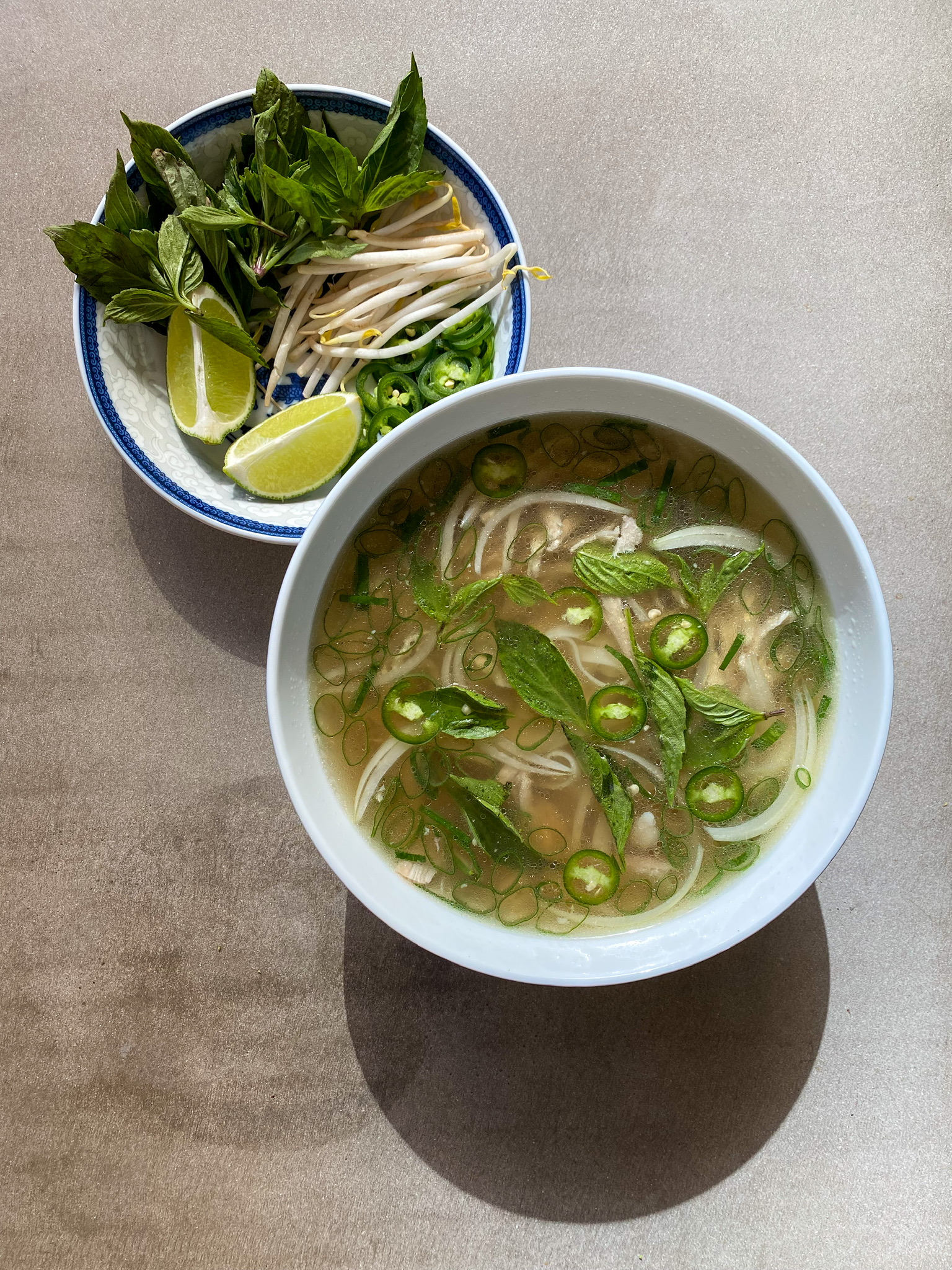
Chicken phở

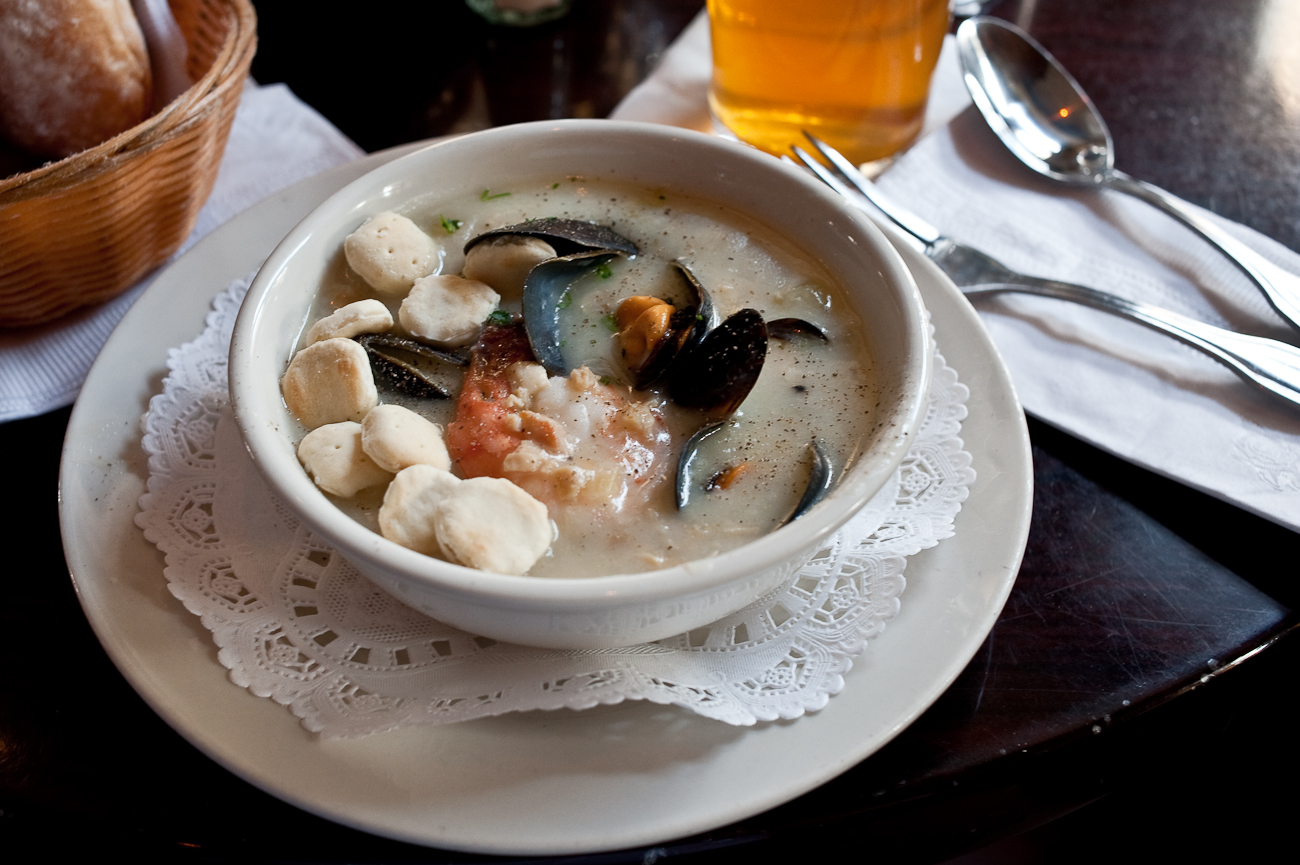
Seafood chowder

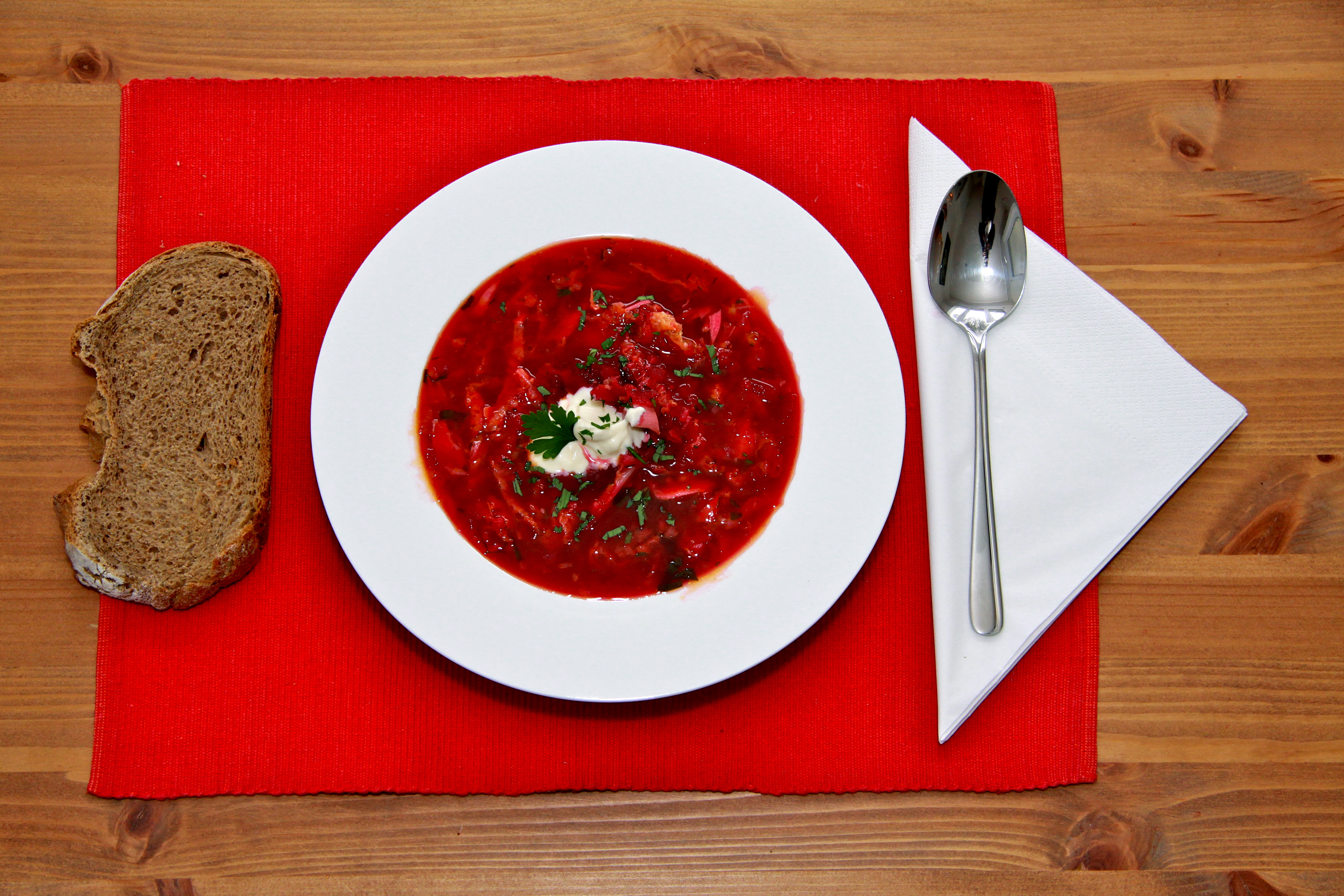
Borscht

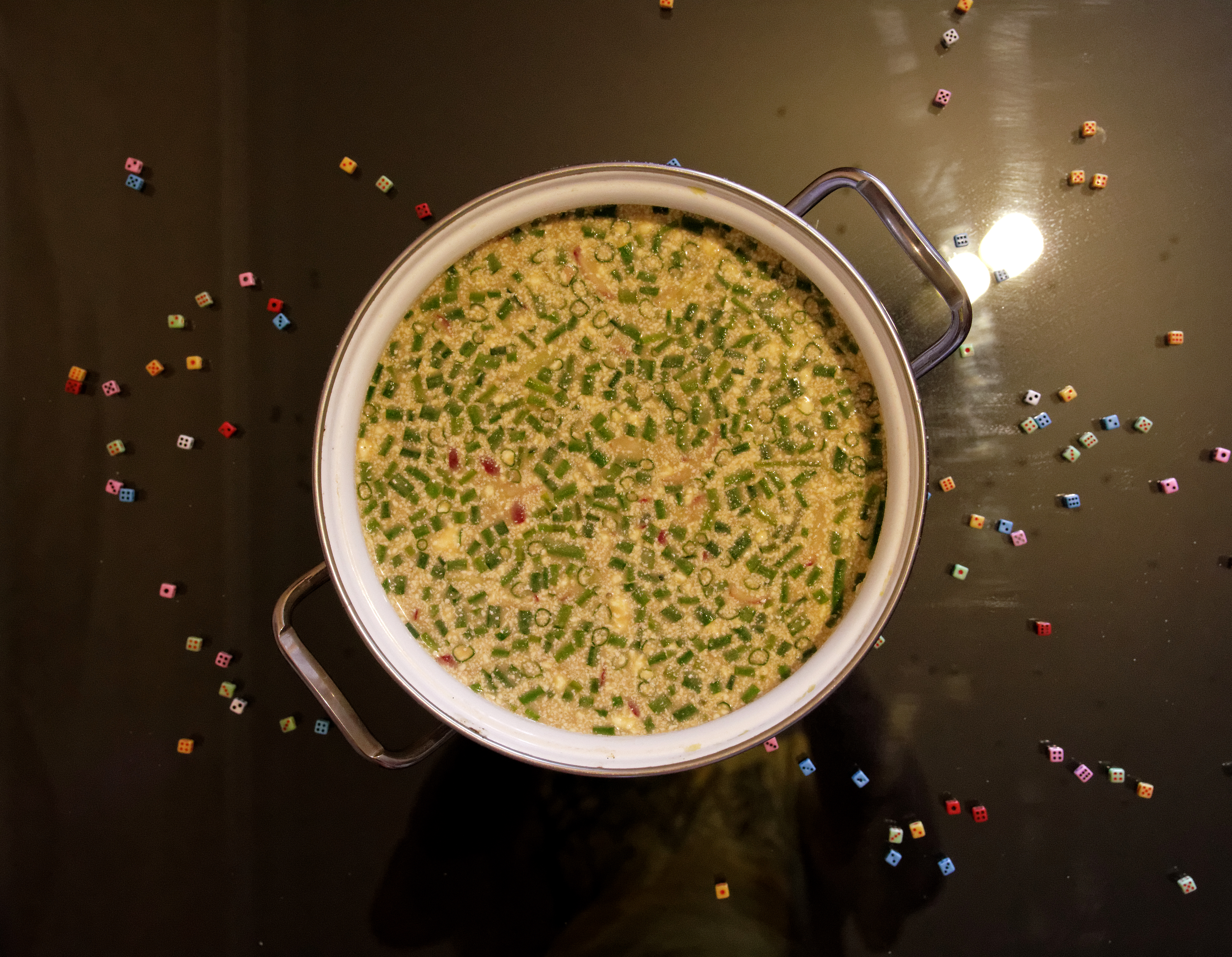
Okroshka

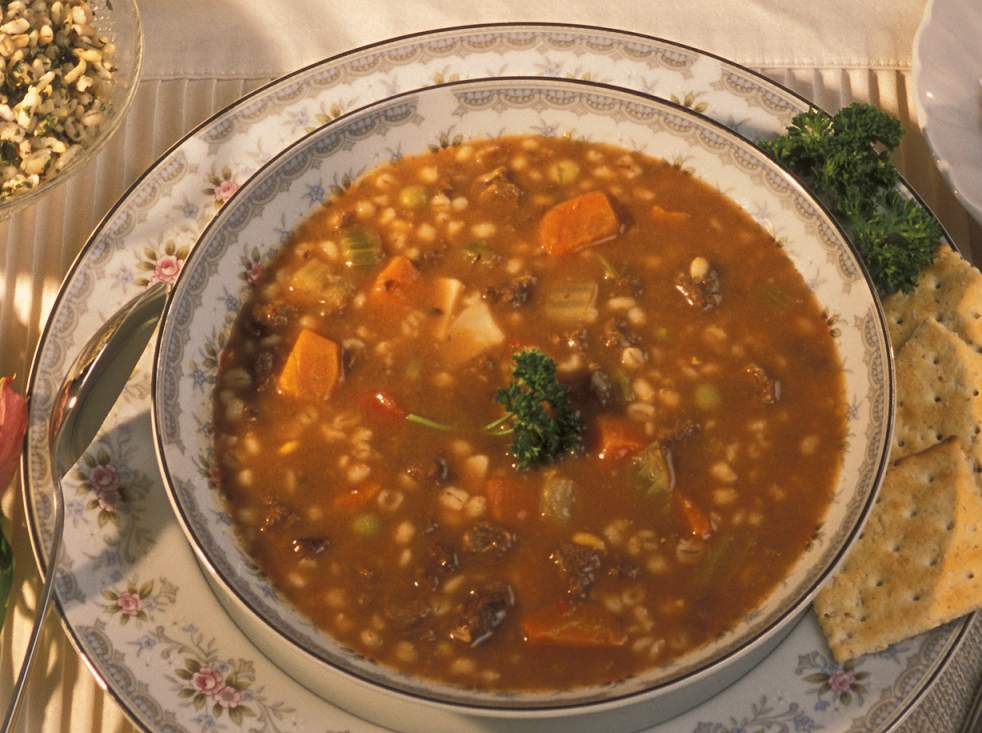
Vegetable beef barley soup

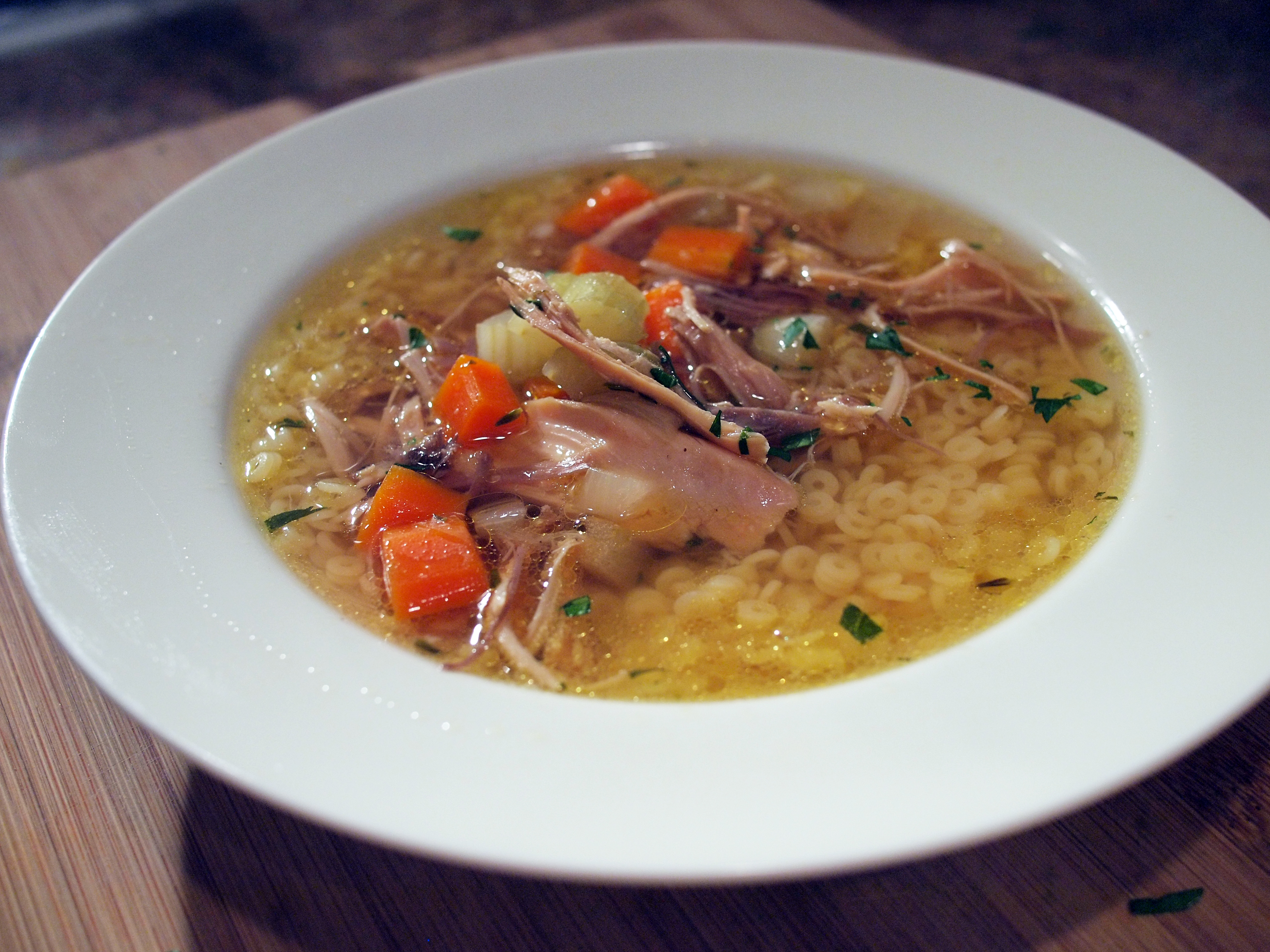
Chicken pasta soup

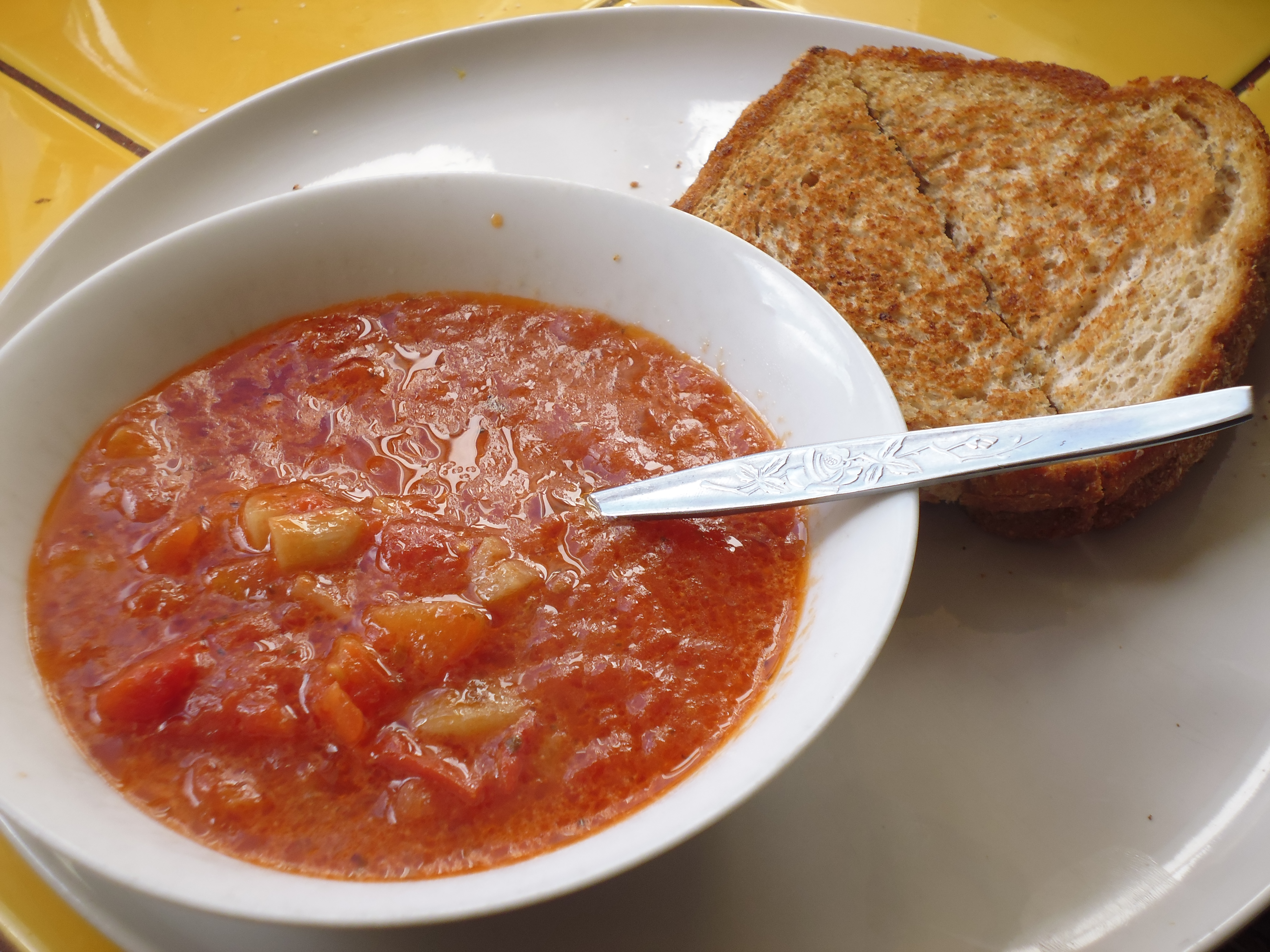
Chunky tomato soup

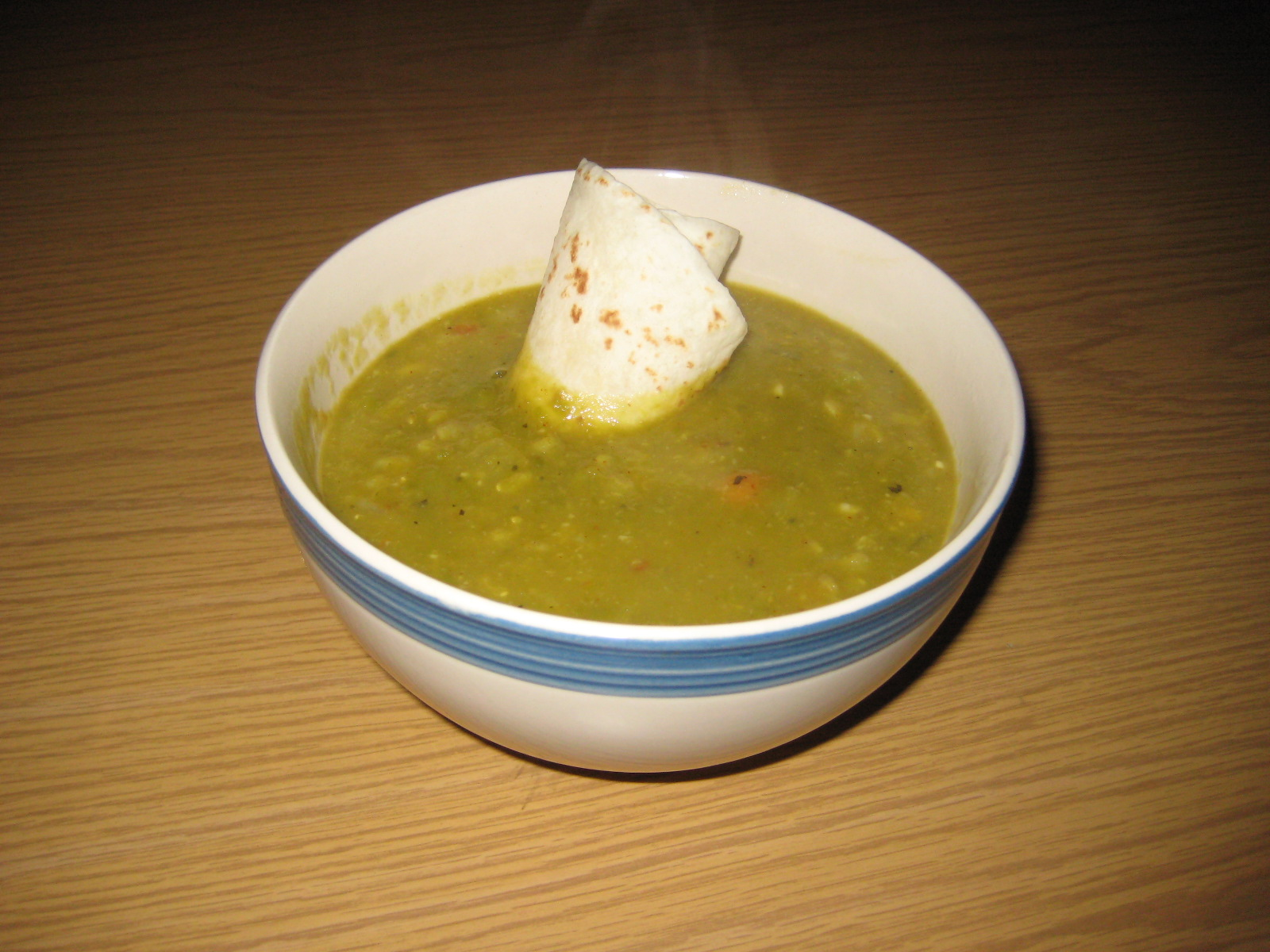
A thick pea soup garnished with a tortilla accent

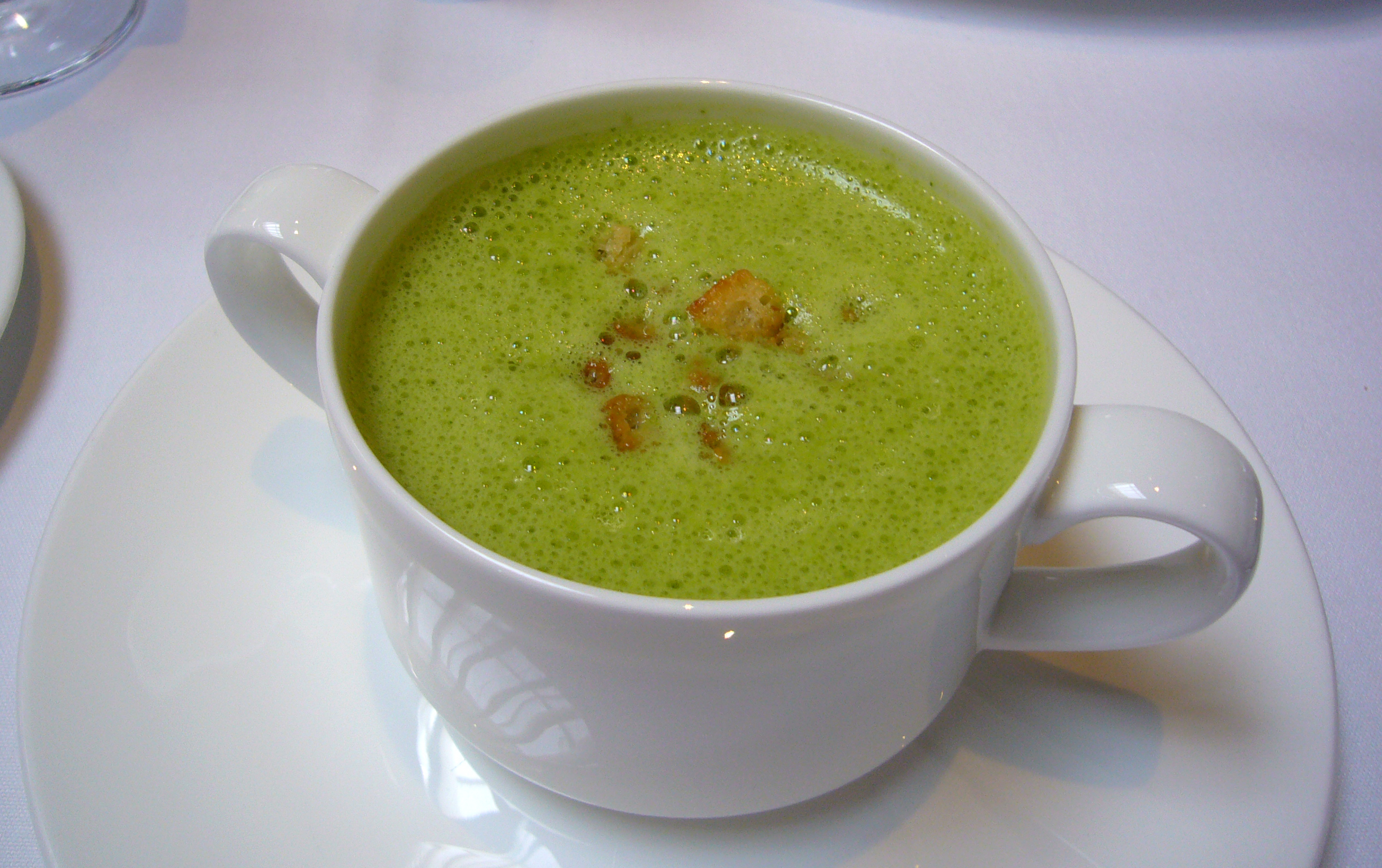
Cream of asparagus soup

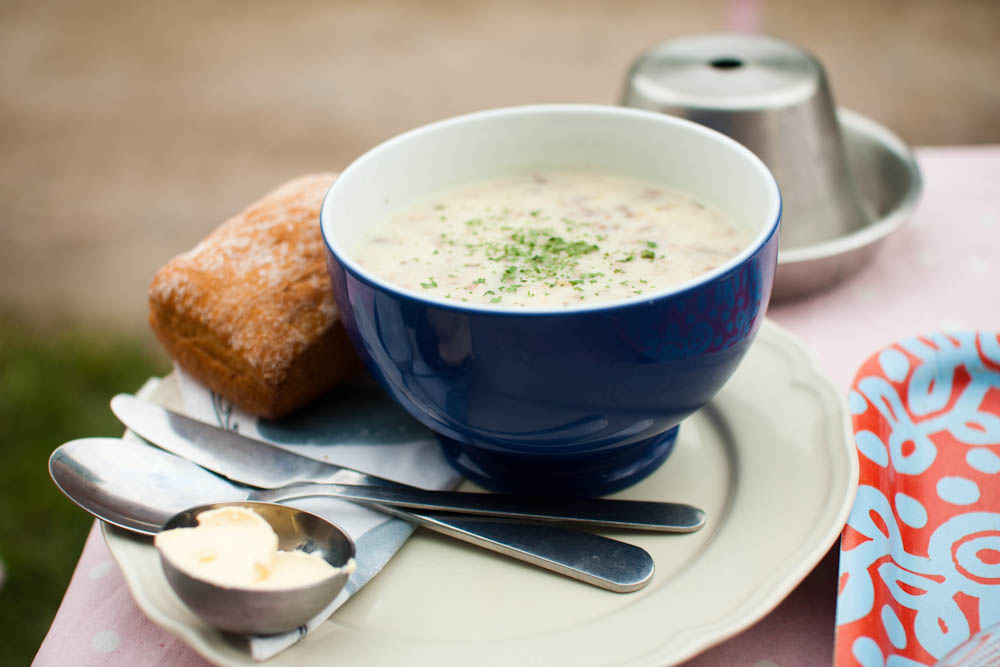
Cheese soup

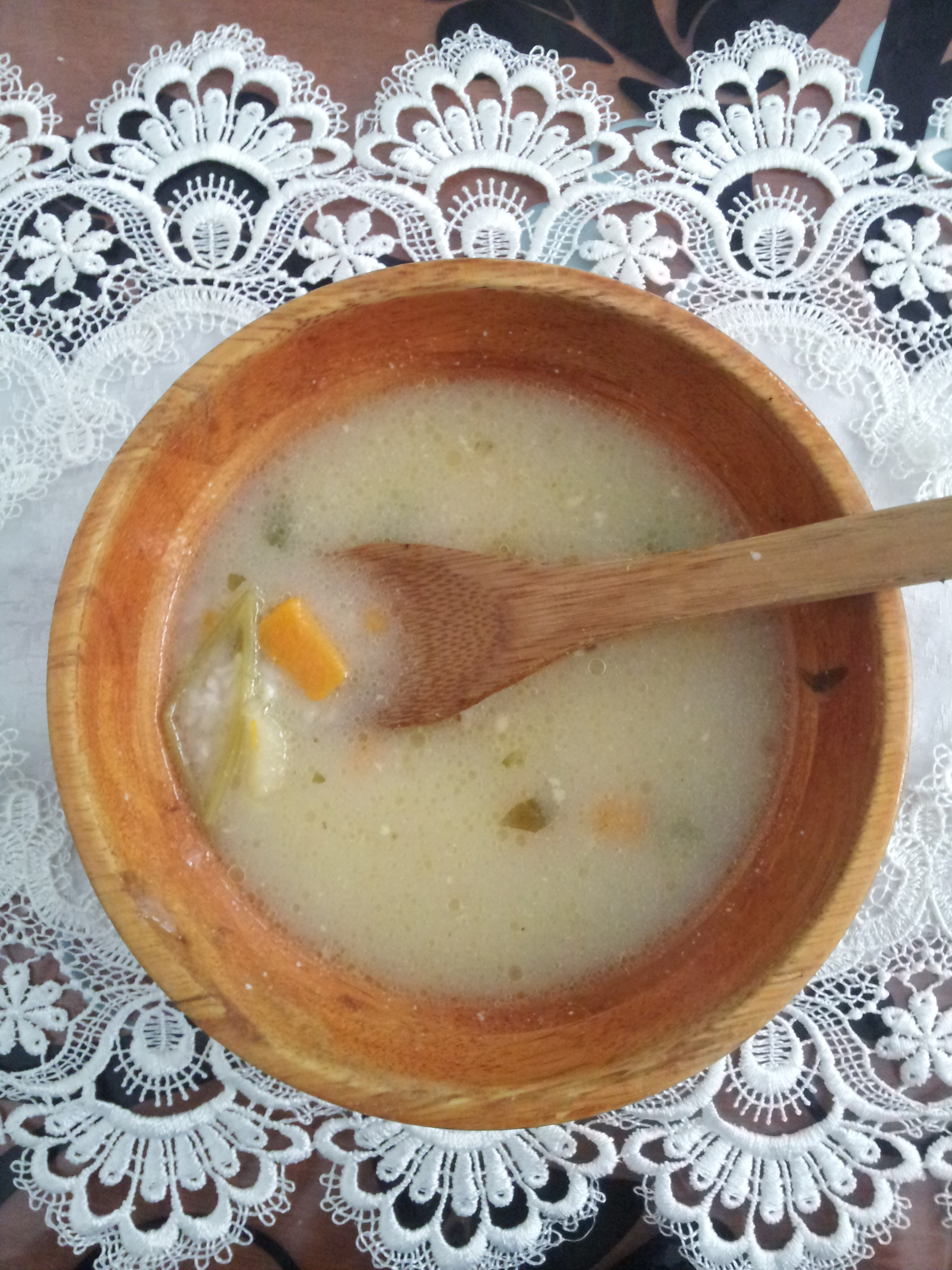
Algerian soup

== Notes, references and sources ==
=== Sources ===
- Anderson, Susan (1995). Indonesian Flavors. Berkeley: Frog. ISBN 1-883319-28-5.
- Anderson, Robert Tuesley (2022). Jane Austen's Table. San Diego: Thunder Bay Press. ISBN 978-1-64-517913-9.
- Applebaum, Anne; Danielle Crittenden (2012). From a Polish Country House Kitchen. San Francisco: Chronicle Books. ISBN 978-1-45-211055-4.
- Ayto, John (2012). The Diner's Dictionary: Word Origins of Food & Drink (second ed.). Oxford: Oxford University Press. ISBN 978-0-19-174443-3.
- Baker, Ian (2004). Country New Zealand: A Culinary Journey. Auckland: New Holland. ISBN 978-1-86966-023-9. OCLC 1244578907.
- Beck, Simone; Louisette Bertholle; Julia Child (2012) [1961]. Mastering the Art of French Cooking, Volume One. London: Particular. ISBN 978-0-241-95339-6.
- Bickel, Walter (1989). Hering's Dictionary of Classical and Modern Cookery (eleventh ed.). London: Virtue. ISBN 978-3-8057-0307-9.
- Blum-Reid, Sylvie (2010). "Cooking With Julia (Child) in France". In C. A. Mahar (ed.). Cuisine and Symbolic Capital: Food in Film and Literature. Newcastle: Cambridge Scholars. ISBN 978-1-44-382255-8.
- Bonekamp, Gunnevi (1973). Scandinavian Cooking. New York: Drake. OCLC 1036846656.
- Briffault, Eugène (2018). Paris à table 1846. Oxford: Oxford University Press. ISBN 978-0-19-084203-1.
- Clarkson, Janet (2010). Soup: A Global History. London: Reaktion. ISBN 978-1-86-189890-6.
- Cowen, Ruth (2006). Relish: The Extraordinary Life of Alexis Soyer, Victorian Celebrity Chef. London: Weidenfeld and Nicolson. ISBN 978-0-297-64562-7.
- David, Elizabeth (1987) [1954]. Italian Food. London: Penguin. ISBN 978-0-14-046841-0.
- David, Elizabeth (2008) [1960]. French Provincial Cooking. London: Folio Society. OCLC 809349711.
- Davidson, Alan (1999). The Oxford Companion to Food (first ed.). Oxford: Oxford University Press. ISBN 978-0-19-211579-9.
- Davidson, Alan (2014). Tom Jaine (ed.). The Oxford Companion to Food (third ed.). Oxford: Oxford University Press. ISBN 978-0-19-967733-7.
- Diat, Louis (1979) [1961]. Gourmet's Basic French Cookbook: Techniques of French Cuisine. New York: Gourmet Books. OCLC 1246316969.
- Dinesen, Isak (2013) [1958]. Babette's Feast and Other Stories. London: Penguin. ISBN 978-0-14-139376-6.
- Edwardes, Sarah (2008). The Good Nutrition Guide. London: Ethical Marketing Group. ISBN 978-0-95-529072-5.
- Escoffier, Auguste (1907). A Guide to Modern Cookery. London: Heinemann. OCLC 1097154246.
- Everson, William (1967). The Films of Laurel & Hardy. New York: Citadel Press. ISBN 978-0-8065-0146-8. OCLC 1244716972.
- Eyles, Allen (1992). Complete Films of the Marx Brothers. New York: Citadel Press. ISBN 0-86-369622-8.
- Featherstone, Susan (2016). A Complete Course in Canning and Related Processes, Volume 2 (fourteenth ed.). Cambridge: Woodhead. ISBN 978-0-85709-678-4.
- Fisher, M. F. K. (1988). Dubious Honors. San Francisco: North Point Press. ISBN 978-0-86547-318-8. OCLC 17926657.
- Gardner, Martin; Mark Burstein, eds. (2015). The Annotated Alice (150th Anniversary ed.). New York: W. W. Norton. ISBN 978-0-393-24543-1.
- Grigson, Sophie (2009). The Soup Book. London: Dorling Kindersley. ISBN 978-1-40-534785-3.
- Hachten, Harva (1998). Best of Regional African Cooking. New York: Hippocrene Books. ISBN 978-0-78-180598-8.
- Hafner, Dorinda (2002). A Taste of Africa: Traditional and Modern African Cooking. Berkeley: Ten Speed Press. ISBN 978-1-58-008403-1.
- Herbert, Ian, ed. (1977). Who's Who in the Theatre (sixteenth ed.). London and Detroit: Pitman Publishing and Gale Research. ISBN 978-0-273-00163-8.
- Hess, Olga; Adolf Franz Hess (1977). Wiener Küche (in German). Vienna: Deuticke. ISBN 3-70-054406-5.
- Irving, Jan (1993). Straw Into Gold: Books and Activities About Folktales. Englewood: Teacher Ideas Press. ISBN 1-56-308074-5.
- Klawans, Harold (1982). The Medicine of History from Paracelsus to Freud. New York: Raven Press. ISBN 0-89-004684-0.
- Lovegren, Sylvia (2007). "Historical Overview: 1960s to the Present". In Andrew F. Smith (ed.). The Oxford Companion to American Food and Drink. New York: Oxford University Press. ISBN 978-0-19-530796-2.
- McGee, Harold (2004). On Food and Cooking (2nd ed.). New York: Scribner. ISBN 1-4165-5637-0.
- Montagné, Prosper (1977). The New Larousse Gastronomique. London: Hamlyn. ISBN 978-0-60-036545-7.
- Odarty, Bill (1971). A Safari of African Cooking (third ed.). Detroit, Michigan: Broadside. ISBN 978-0-91-029663-2.
- Oliver, Sandra (2007). "Crab". In Andrew F. Smith (ed.). The Oxford Companion to American Food and Drink. New York: Oxford University Press. ISBN 978-0-19-530796-2.
- Rumble, Victoria (2009). Soup Through the Ages. Jefferson: McFarland. ISBN 978-0-78-645390-0.
- Rundell, Maria (1806). A New System of Domestic Cookery. London: John Murray. OCLC 970770908.
- Saulnier, Louis (1978) [1914]. Le répertoire de la cuisine (fourteenth ed.). London: Jaeggi. OCLC 1086737491.
- Scala Quinn, Lucinda (2006). Lucinda's Authentic Jamaican Kitchen. Hoboken: Wiley. ISBN 978-0-47-174935-6.
- Smith, Andrew F. (2007). "Soups and Stews". In Andrew F. Smith (ed.). The Oxford Companion to American Food and Drink. New York: Oxford University Press. ISBN 978-0-19-530796-2.
- Spiegl, Fritz (1996). Fritz Spiegl's Sick Notes. New York: Parthenon. ISBN 1-85-070627-1.
- Tannahill, Reay (2002). Food in History. London: Hodder. ISBN 0-7472-6796-0.
- Van Wyk, Magdaleen (1996). Traditional South African Cooking. Johannesburg: CNA. ISBN 978-1-43-230347-1.
- Wesker, Arnold (1969). The Wesker Trilogy. London: Penguin. OCLC 258413284.
- Williams-Forson, Psyche (2014). "'I Haven't Eaten If I Don't Have My Soup and Fufu': Cultural Preservation through Food and Foodways among Ghanaian Migrants in the United States". Africa Today. 61 (1): 69–87. doi:10.2979/africatoday.61.1.69. (subscription required)
- Zimmerman, Steve (2010). Food in the Movies (second ed.). Jefferson: McFarland. ISBN 978-0-78-645569-0.

== See also ==
- Lists of foods
- List of bean soups
- List of fish and seafood soups
- Soup and sandwich
- Soup spoon
- Three grand soups
