= Cream of asparagus soup =

Soup prepared with asparagus, stock, and milk or cream

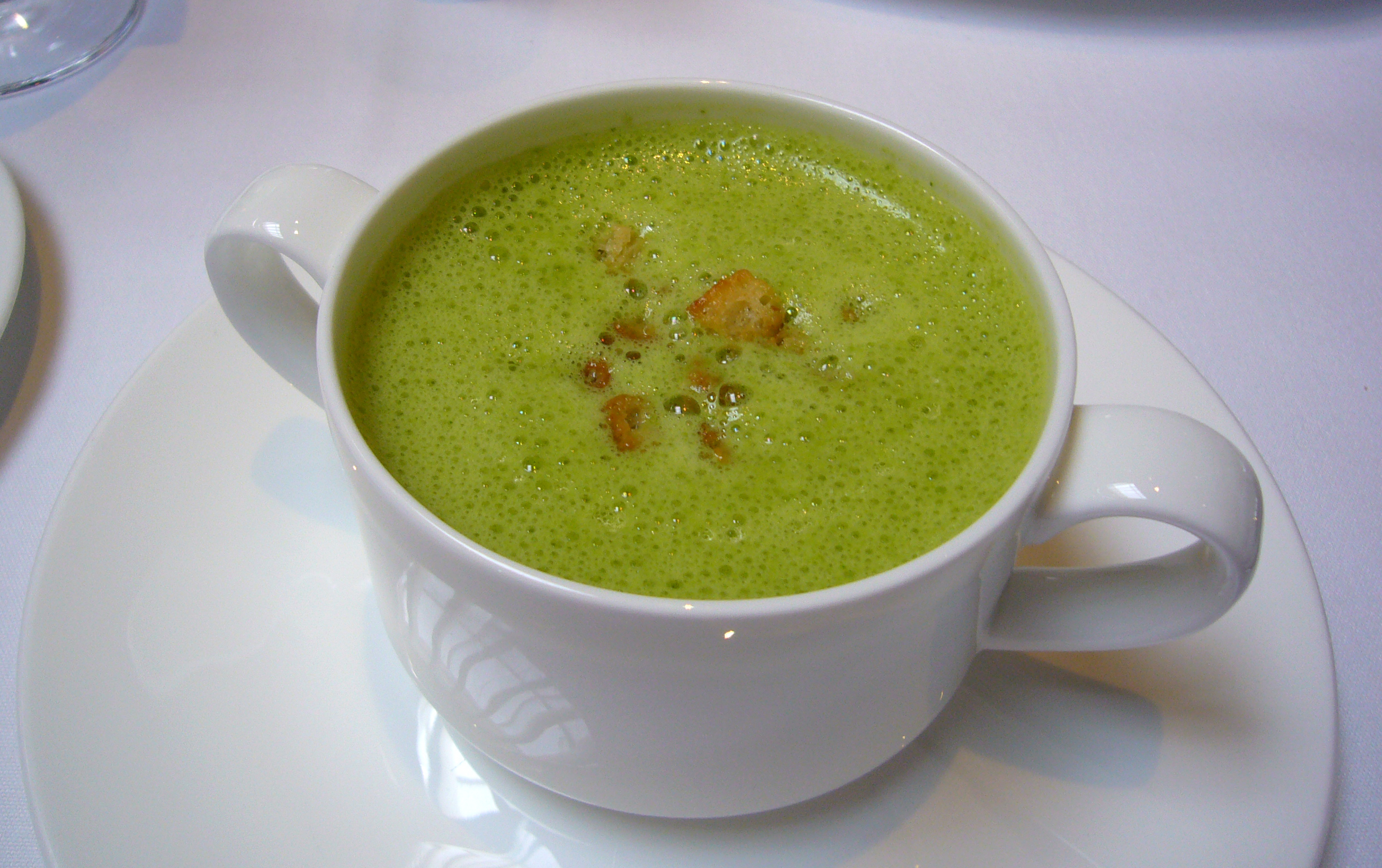
- Cream of asparagus soup
- Type: Soup

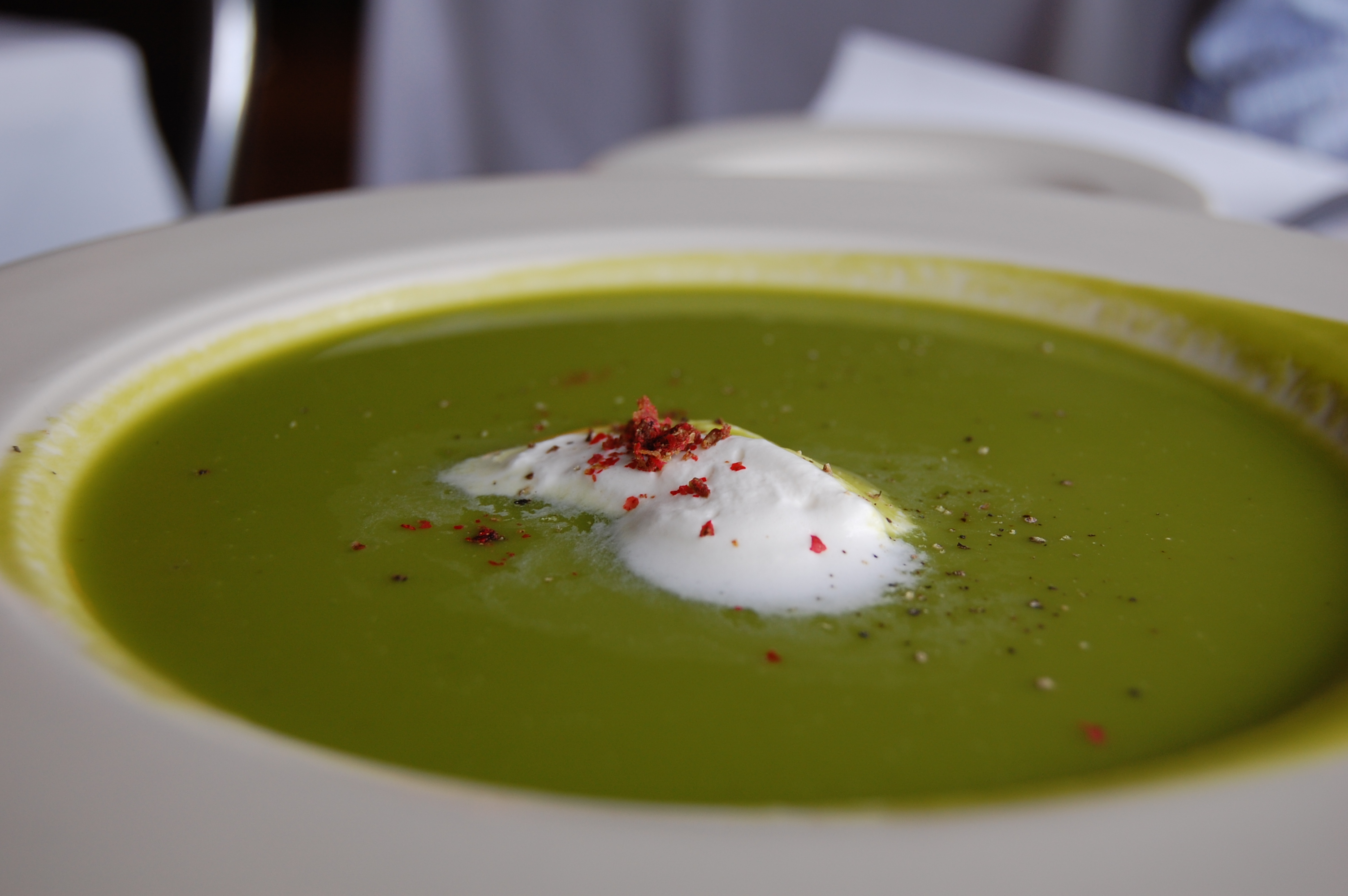
Chilled asparagus soup with crème fraîche and pink peppercorn

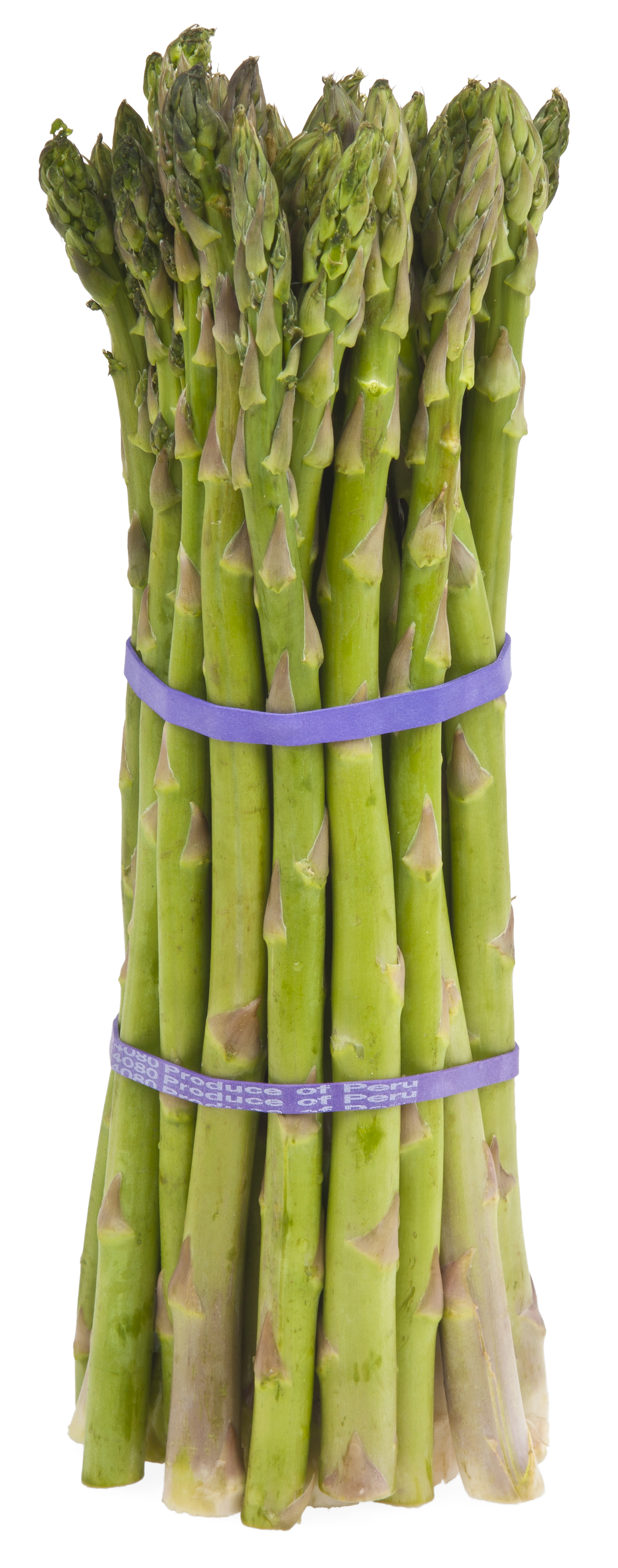
Asparagus is a main ingredient in cream of asparagus soup.

Cream of asparagus soup is a soup prepared with asparagus, stock and milk or cream as primary ingredients.

Ingredient variations exist. Cream of asparagus soup may be served hot or cold, and the soup may be finished with various garnishes such as chives, crème fraîche and sour cream.

== Ingredients and preparation methods ==
Asparagus, a light chicken or vegetable stock and milk or cream are primary ingredients. The cooked asparagus may be puréed or pulped in its preparation, and some preparations may combine both puréed and solid forms of asparagus, such as cooked asparagus tips. Puréed versions may be strained through a sieve to remove stray stringy asparagus matter. The use of thick pieces of asparagus can enhance the flavor of puréed versions of cream of asparagus soup, as can the use of fresh asparagus while it is in season (during spring).

It may be thickened using a roux, and some versions may omit milk and use extra stock, along with additional roux to thicken the soup. It may be served garnished with cooked asparagus tips, croutons, sour cream, crème fraîche, herbs such as chives, parsley and tarragon, and other foods. Cold versions may contain cream stirred into the soup prior to serving, or may be topped with sour cream.

Additional ingredients in its preparation may include half and half, light cream, evaporated milk, onion, garlic, lemon juice, celery, salt, pepper, leeks and herbs such as basil and parsley. Cheese may add flavor and thickness to the soup in versions that omit cream or milk. Sometimes rice is added.

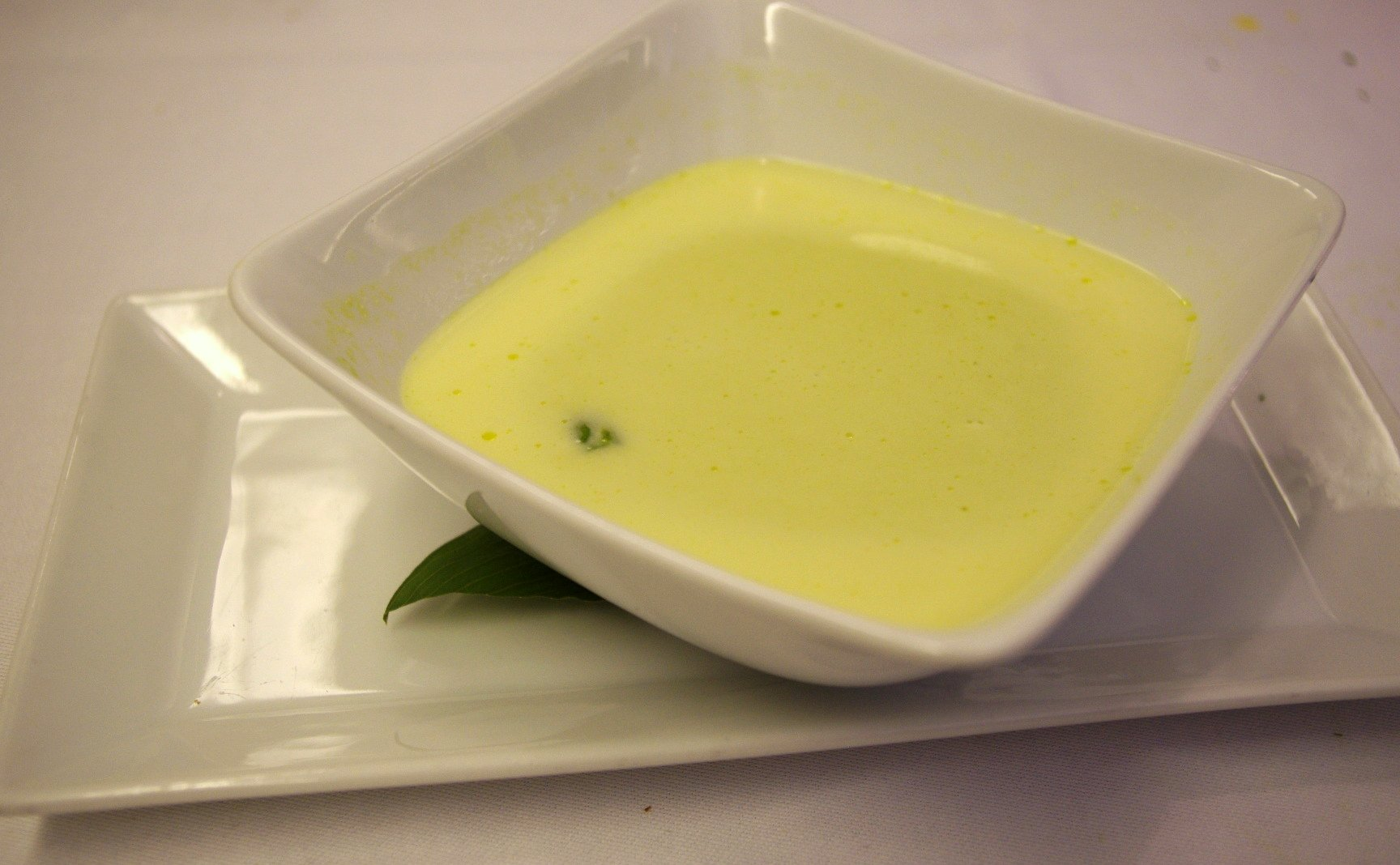
Creamy asparagus soup with asparagus tips

== See also ==
- List of cream soups
- List of soups
- List of vegetable soups
- Vegetable soup
