= On Food and Cooking =

Book by Harold McGee

- U.S. second edition cover
- Author: Harold McGee
- Language: English
- Genre: Food compendium
- Publisher: Scribner U.S. Hodder & Stoughton UK
- Publication date: November 1984; November 2004 (second edition)
- Publication place: United States
- Media type: Print (hardcover)
- Pages: 704 first edition 896 second edition
- ISBN: 978-0-684-80001-1 (U.S.); 9780340831496 (UK)

On Food And Cooking: The Science And Lore Of The Kitchen is a book by Harold McGee, published by Scribner in the United States in 1984 and revised extensively for a second edition in 2004. It is published by Hodder & Stoughton in Britain under the title McGee on Food and Cooking: An Encyclopedia of Kitchen Science, History and Culture.

The book provides a reference to the scientific understanding and preparation of food. In the introduction, McGee writes, "It explains the nature of our foods, what they are made of and where they came from, how they are transformed by cooking, when and why particular culinary habits took hold."

It has been described by Alton Brown as "the Rosetta stone of the culinary world", Daniel Boulud has called the book a "must for every cook who possesses an inquiring mind", while Heston Blumenthal has stated it is "the book that has had the greatest single impact on my cooking".

The work is separated into sections that focus on the ingredients, providing the structure for the author to speculate on the history of foodstuffs and cookery, and the molecular characteristics of food flavors, while the text is illustrated by charts, graphs, pictures, and sidebar boxes with quotes from sources such as Brillat-Savarin and Plutarch.

The book advises on how to cook many things (e.g., for pasta use abundant water, with reasons and the science behind everything) and includes a few historical recipes (e.g., Fish or Meat Jelly, by Taillevent in 1375), but no modern recipes as such.

== Structure of the book ==
The book is broken down into three parts:

- Part 1: Foods
  - Chapter 1: Milk and Dairy Products
  - Chapter 2: Eggs
  - Chapter 3: Meat
  - Chapter 4: Fruits and Vegetables, Herbs and Spices
  - Chapter 5: Grains, Legumes, and Nuts
  - Chapter 6: Bread, Doughs, and Batters
  - Chapter 7: Sauces
  - Chapter 8: Sugars, Chocolate, and Confectionary
  - Chapter 9: Wine, Beer, and Distilled Liquors
  - Chapter 10: Food Additives
- Part 2: Food and the Body
  - Chapter 11: Nutrition: American Fads, Intricate Facts
  - Chapter 12: Digestion and Sensation
- Part 3: The Principles of Cooking: A Summary
  - Chapter 13: The Four Basic Food Molecules
  - Chapter 14: Cooking Methods and Utensil Materials
  - Appendix: A Chemistry Primer: Atoms, Molecules, Energy Atoms and Molecules

== See also ==
- Food science
