= Harold McGee =

American author (born 1951)

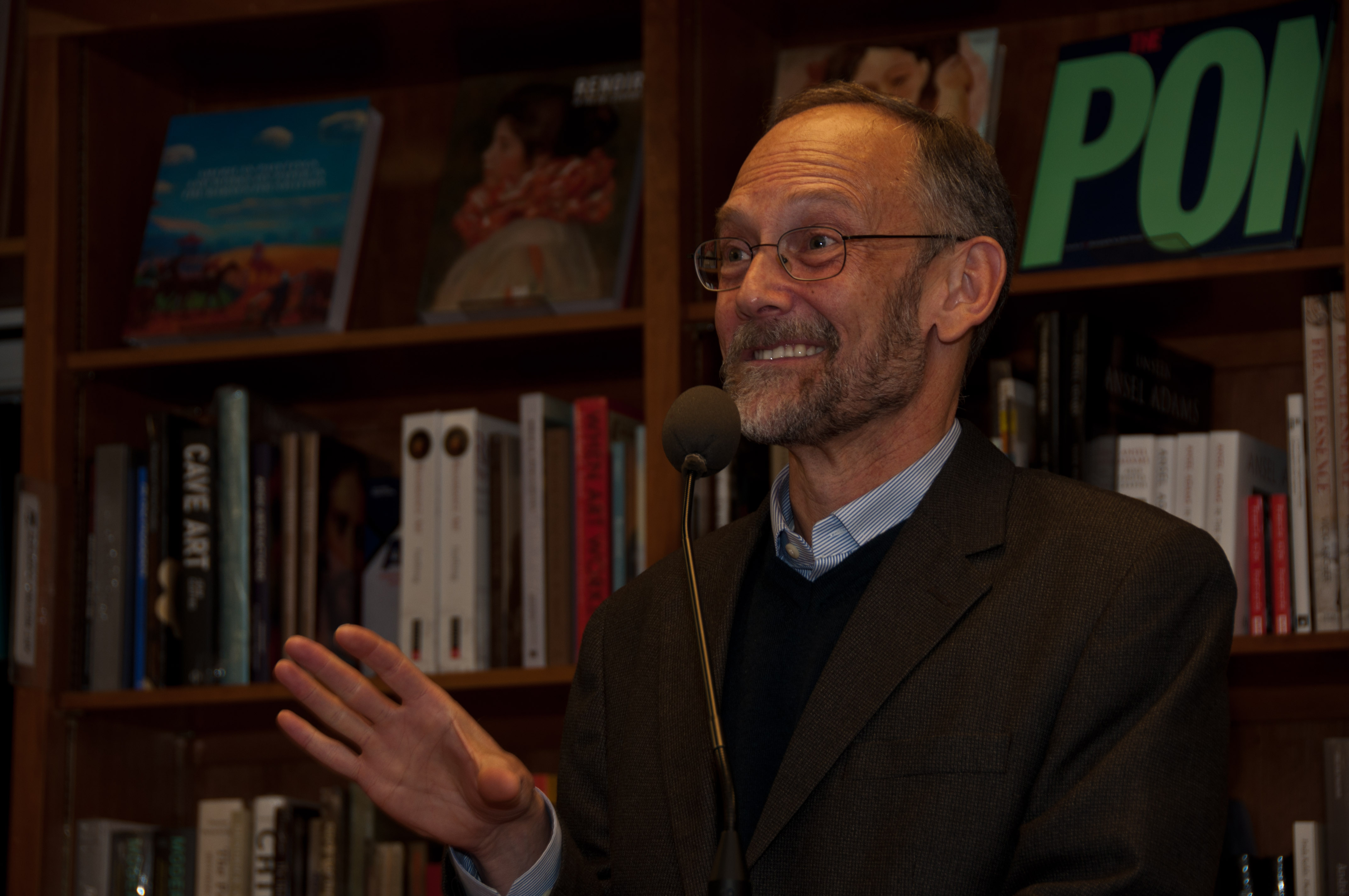
- McGee in 2010
- Born: Harold James McGee; October 3, 1951 (age 74)
- Education: California Institute of Technology (BS); Yale University (PhD)
- Known for: On Food and Cooking
- Spouse: Sharon R. Long (m. 1979; div. 2004)
- Children: 2
- Scientific career
- Fields: Cooking; Chemistry; Food science; Kitchen science; Molecular gastronomy
- Thesis: Keats and the Progress of Taste (1978)
- Doctoral advisor: Harold Bloom
- Website: haroldmcgee.substack.com

Harold James McGee (born October 3, 1951) is an American author who writes about the chemistry and history of food science and cooking. He is best known for his seminal book On Food and Cooking: The Science and Lore of the Kitchen, first published in 1984 and revised in 2004.

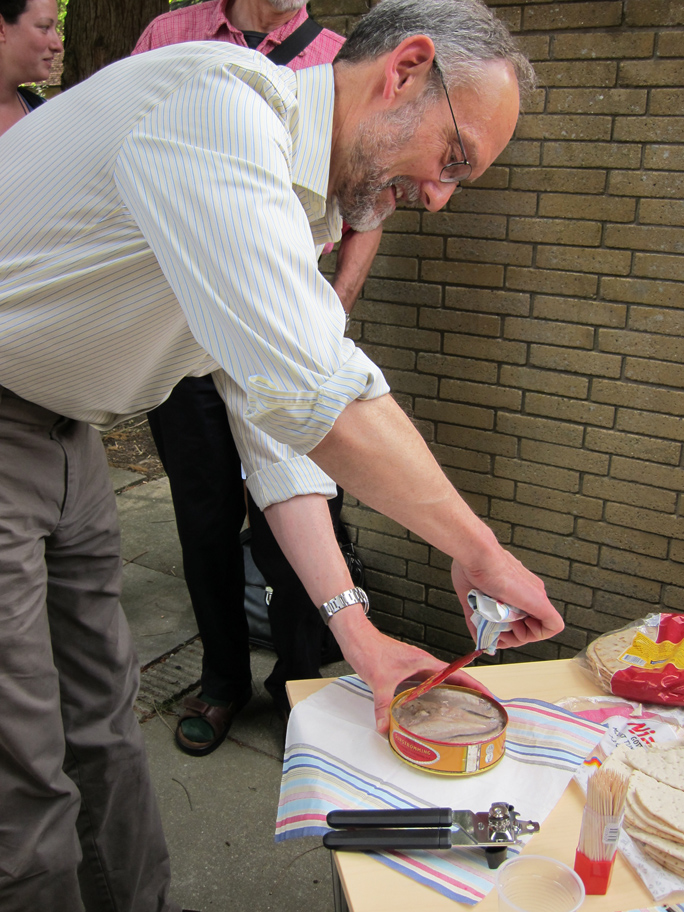
Harold McGee tastes surströmming (Swedish fermented herring) at the Oxford Symposium on Food and Cookery (2010).

== Early life ==
McGee was born on 3 October 1951 in Cambridge, Massachusetts, to Louise (Hanney) and Charles Gilbert McGee, and raised in Elmhurst, Illinois. He was educated at the California Institute of Technology (Caltech), initially studying astronomy, but graduating with a Bachelor of Science (BS) degree in Literature in 1973. He went on to complete a PhD on the romantic poetry of John Keats supervised by Harold Bloom at Yale University, graduating in 1978.

== Career ==
Before becoming a food science writer, McGee was a literature and writing instructor at Yale. He has also written for Nature, Health, The New York Times, the World Book Encyclopedia, The Art of Eating, Food & Wine, Fine Cooking, and Physics Today. He has lectured on kitchen chemistry at cooking schools, universities, the Oxford Symposia on Food and Cookery, the Denver Natural History Museum, and the Fermi National Accelerator Laboratory. For a brief time he wrote a regular column for the New York Times, The Curious Cook, which examined, and often debunked, conventional kitchen wisdom. His book on smells was published in 2020 .

With Dave Arnold and Nils Norén, McGee teaches a three-day class, The Harold McGee Lecture Series, at the French Culinary Institute in New York City.

=== Awards and honors ===
McGee is a visiting scholar at Harvard University.

His book On Food and Cooking has won numerous awards and is used widely in food science courses at many universities.

=== Influences ===
McGee's scientific approach to cooking has been embraced and popularized by chefs and authors such as David Chang and J. Kenji Lopez-Alt.

== Personal life ==
McGee married his college girlfriend Sharon Rugel Long on July 7, 1979; they divorced in 2004. They had two children, son John (born 1986) and daughter Florence (born 1988).
