= Three Sisters tomato =

Variety of tomato

Three Sisters

Tomato (Solanum lycopersicum)
- Maturity: 75 days
- Type: Heirloom
- Vine: Indeterminate
- Plant height: 9 feet
- Fruit weight: 6 oz
- Leaf: Potato leaf
- Resist.: V, F
- Color: Red (pink)
- Shape: Plum, globe

The Three Sisters is a variety of tomato, so named because the plant grows vegetables in three different shapes, each given plant producing only one of the three:

- a large single-pleated size (most common)
- a more cylindrical shape, like a Roma tomato
- a pleated, flattened globe type

== See also ==
- List of tomato cultivars
