= List of tomato cultivars =

There are more than 10,000 tomato varieties available.

== Table of tomatoes ==
Image	Common name	Color	Maturity (days)	Genetic type	Fruit size	Shape	Growth	Leaf type	Primary use	Disease resistance code^{[exp.]}	Additional information	Refs
	Alicante	Red	55–70	Heirloom	2–6 oz	Standard	Indeterminate	Regular leaf			Common in the UK, used to be the classic breakfast tomato because of the high productivity & taste	
	Amish Paste	Red	80–85	Heirloom	6–12 oz	Oxheart to plum	Indeterminate					
	Azoychka	Yellow	68–78	Heirloom	Large	Beefsteak	Indeterminate	Regular leaf			Russian Heirloom ripens to pale orange – flavour similar to Limmony	
	Aunt Ruby's German Green	Green	85–95	Heirloom	12–16 oz	Beefsteak	Indeterminate	Regular Leaf			Originally from Germany. Cultivated in Tennessee by Ruby Arnold. Sweet flavor with a hint of spice.	
	Beefsteak	Red	96	Heirloom	Large	Beefsteak	Indeterminate	Regular leaf	Sandwiches, slicing, stewing, canning		Common in the United States. Includes varieties Red Ponderosa and Coustralee. Can reach up to 4 lb / 1.8 kg. in weight. High fiber. Vitamin C greater if vine ripened. Popular with restaurants for sandwiches and burgers due to its size.	
	Better Boy	Red	70–80	Hybrid	Medium/ Large	Standard	Indeterminate	Regular leaf		F V N T		
	Berkeley Tie-Dye Green	Variegated Orange/Green	75–80	Open-Pollinated Hybrid	8–16 oz	Slicing	Indeterminate	Regular Leaf			Developed in California by Brad Gates of Wild Boar Farms Sweet, salty, spicy based on color.	
	Big Beef	Red	70–80	Hybrid	Medium	Beefsteak	Indeterminate	Regular leaf		F V N T	1994 AAS winner	
	Big Rainbow	Yellow/ Red	80–85	Heirloom	Large	Beefsteak	Indeterminate	Regular Leaf			Large fruited yellow tomatoes with red swirls, and mild/sweet flavor	
Blaby Special ripened August 14 2023. Grown from seed late May.	Blaby Special	Red	70–80	Heirloom	Medium	Round					Originally from Blaby England and supplied throughout the country during WWII. Cultivar was brought back into cultivation in 2006	
	Black Beauty	Black	80	Open-Pollinated Hybrid	10–14 oz	Beefsteak	Indeterminate	Regular Leaf	Slicing		Developed by Brad Gates of Wild Boar Farms, Napa California. Rich, earthy flavor. The darkest tomato variety so far developed.	
	Black Cherry	Purple/Red	65–75	Open-Pollinated Hybrid	Small	Cherry	Indeterminate	Regular Leaf	Salads		Rich flavor.	
	Black Icicle	Purple/Red		Open-Pollinated Hybrid	4 oz	Plum	Indeterminate	Regular Leaf	Saucing Drying		Rich, sweet, earthy flavor.	
	Black Krim	Purple/ Brown	70–80	Heirloom	Large	Beefsteak	Indeterminate	Regular Leaf	Slicing Salad		Rather low production. Originally from the Crimean peninsula, or Isle of Krim off its coast, on the Black Sea Rich, sweet flavor.	
	Brandywine	Pink	80–100	Heirloom	Up to 24 oz	Beefsteak	Indeterminate	Potato Leaf			Noted for a "great tomatoey flavor" and large size. Often features green shoulders Variety dates back to 1885.	
	Carbon	Burgundy	90	Heirloom	10–14 oz	Beefsteak	Indeterminate	Regular Leaf	Salad Slicing Canning		Complex flavor.	
	Campari	Red	69–80	Hybrid	Small	Cocktail	Indeterminate	Regular Leaf		T	Noted for its juiciness, high sugar level, low acidity, and lack of mealiness	
	Canario (tomato)	Red			Medium	Round					Fruits on show & edible to birds. Magnesium deficiency on lower leaves and very common – not a major problem. Remove infected leaves.	
	Celebrity	Red	70	Hybrid	10 oz.	Flattened Globe	Semi-Determinate	Regular Leaf		A V FF N T	1998 AAS (All-American Selection) winner. Known for good flavor	
	Cherokee Purple	Brown/ Purple	70–80	Heirloom	8–12 oz	Beefsteak	Indeterminate	Regular Leaf	Slicing Salad	F	Developed by Craig LeHoullier of Raleigh, North Carolina after receiving a packet of seeds from John Green of Sevierville, Tennessee. Passed down for over 100 years before Green's acquisition, it is said that they were originally given to the family by the Cherokee Nation.	
	Cherry Bambelo	Orange									A variety of Orange baby plum tomato	
	Cherry Nebula	Red									Alternative names: England: Sweet Rosso – Belgium: BelRosso	
	Chocolate Pear	Burgundy/Green	65–80	Open-Pollinated Hybrid	1 oz	Pear	Indeterminate	Regular Leaf	Canning Saucing Salad		Developed by Terrior Seeds. Rich, balanced flavor.	
	Dad's Sunset	Orange	75–80	Heirloom	10–14 oz	Pear	Indeterminate	Regular Leaf			Sweet and slightly tart flavor.	
	Dester	Pink	75	Heirloom	16–24 oz	Beefsteak	Indeterminate	Regular Leaf			Brought to the Indiana by Dr. Dester and his family in the 1970s, this German variety was shared with their Amish house cleaner Anna, who then introduced the seeds to others. Sweet flavor.	
	Dr. Wyche's Yellow	Yellow/Orange	80	Heirloom	16 oz	Beefsteak	Indeterminate	Regular Leaf			Developed by Dr. John Wyche. Named "Hot Yellow" in 1985, it was renamed in honor of Dr. Wyche when sold to the public. Tropical, sweet flavor. Low acid.	
	Early Girl	Red	63	Hybrid	Medium	Standard	Indeterminate	Regular Leaf		F V	Named "Early Girl" to complement the existing Better Boy variety	
	Ed's Millennium	Red	85	Heirloom	Large	Beefsteak	Indeterminate	Regular			Saved by University of California Master Gardener Edgar Lo of Cupertino, California	
	Emerald Evergreen	Green	70–80	Heirloom	6–10 oz	Slicing	Indeterminate	Regular Leaf			Developed by Glecklers Seedsmen c.1950 Sweet flavor. Low Acid.	
	Enchantment	Red	70–80	Hybrid	Small	Standard	Indeterminate	Regular leaf		F V N		
	Ferris Wheel	Pink	90	Heirloom	Large	Beefsteak	Indeterminate	Wispy Regular Leaf			Developed by John A. Salzer Seed Company in 1894. Craig Lehoullier has regrown them (old seeds) and are purchasable once again. Intense flavor.	
	Flamenco	Red	58–74	Hybrid	Medium	Round	Semi-determinate	Regular Leaf			Open-pollinated tomato for the Southwest. A cross between Silvery Fir Tree and Floridade. Continues to produce in hot weather.	
	Fourth of July	Red	49	Hybrid	Medium	Standard	Indeterminate	Regular leaf			Named as such since it is expected to ripen early, likely before U.S. Independence Day	
	Gardener's Delight	Red	65	Heirloom	Small	Standard	Indeterminate	Regular leaf			Popular for high yields of bite-sized fruit	
	Garden Peach	Yellow	75	Heirloom	Large	Round	Indeterminate	Regular leaf			Has a fuzzy skin similar to peaches, hence the name.	
	German Johnson	Pink/Red	76	Heirloom	Large	Standard	Indeterminate	Regular leaf			Low relative yield per plant but very large fruit	
	German Lunchbox	Pink	70–80	Heirloom	Small	Plum	Indeterminate	Regular Leaf			Brought to Missouri by a German immigrant family, these tomatoes were shared with Baker Creek Heirloom Seeds and now the seeds are commercially distributed. Sugary sweet flavor.	
	German Pink	Pink	85–90	Heirloom	16–32 oz	Beefsteak	Indeterminate	Regular Leaf			One of two tomato varieties that inspired the creation of the Seed Savers Exchange. Brought to the US from Bavaria in 1883 by Michael Ott.	
	Giulietta F1	Red	70–80	Hybrid	Large	Plum	Standard	Regular Leaf		A V F N T	A large fruited ‘Italian’ plum variety, which set well, even under cool conditions. They are known for being extremely juicy and delicious with a high yield. They are ideal for greenhouses and sunny sheltered spots outdoors.	
	Granadero	Red	75	Hybrid	Medium	Roma	Indeterminate	Regular leaf		A V F N T	Very high yielding Roma tomato. Greenhouse or outdoors	
	Great White	Yellow		Heirloom	Large	Standard	Indeterminate	Regular leaf			Low yield of large pale yellow beefsteak tomatoes. Average flavor.	
	Green Doctors	Green	75–85	Open Pollinated Hybrid	~1 oz	Cherry	Indeterminate	Regular Leaf			A variation of the Dr. Carolyn variety discovered by Dr. Amy Goldman in New York c. 2002. Sweet and tart in flavor	
	Green Giant	Green	85	Hybrid	12–32 oz	Beefsteak	Indeterminate	Potato Leaf			German variety cultivated by Reinhard Kraft c. early 2000s. Sweet, complex flavor.	
	Green Zebra	Variegated Green/Yellow	70–80	Open Pollinated	~3 oz	Standard	Indeterminate	Regular leaf			Developed in Everett, WA by Tom Wagner c.1983. Sweet and tangy flavor	
	Hanover tomato				large							
	Henderson's Pink Ponderosa	Pink	85	Heirloom	16–32 oz	Standard	Indeterminate	Regular Leaf			Developed around the 1870s by Anne Ponderosa and Wallace Hoss-Tentinger. Introduced to the public in 1891 by Peter Henderson. Rich flavor.	
	Hillbilly	Red/ Orange	85	Heirloom	Large	Standard	Indeterminate	Potato Leaf				
	Hungarian Heart	Pink	80	Heirloom	Up to 16 oz	Oxheart	Indeterminate	Regular Leaf			Brought to the United States in 1901 from a village near Budapest. It was introduced to the SSE in 1991 by Jerry Muller of Alabama. Muller received the seeds from Ed Simon of Pennsylvania in 1988 Rich flavor.	
	Japanese Black Trifele	Burgundy/ Black/ Green	70–80	Heirloom	Medium	Pear	Indeterminate	Potato leaf			Also known as Black Russian Trifele	
	Jersey Boy	Red	70–75	Hybrid	Large	Standard	Indeterminate	Regular leaf			A hybrid of the Rutgers tomato and the Brandywine by the Burpee Seed Company, it made its first appearance in commercial seed circa 2015. Burpee dubs it the “Supertomato.” 8 oz. to 10 oz. fruits combine the Brandywine's sweet-sour with the Rutgers classic rich color, thicker skin. It has the Rutgers' yield and harvesting characteristics as well.	
	Jubilee	Yellow	72	Heirloom	Medium	Standard	Indeterminate	Regular leaf			Released by Burpee Seed in 1943, and AAS winner same year	
	Juliet	Red	55–68	Hybrid	Small	Plum	Indeterminate	Regular leaf			Resistant to cracking on the vine, long shelf life, 1999 AAS winner	
	Kellogg's Breakfast	Orange	70–80	Heirloom	15–32 oz	Beefsteak	Indeterminate	Regular Leaf			Developed by a friend of Darrell Kellogg in West Virginia. Sweet, tangy flavor.	
	Kentucky Beefsteak	Orange	80	Heirloom	14–32 oz	Beefsteak	Indeterminate	Regular Leaf			Fruity, sweet flavor.	
	Kumato	Brown/ Red	70–80	Hybrid	Small/ Medium	Standard	Indeterminate	Regular leaf			High fructose content tomato. A trade name for the variety Olmeca.	
	Lillian's Yellow	Yellow	90	Heirloom	Medium	Standard		Potato Leaf			Originally collected by Lillian Bruce of Tennessee	
	Malakhitovaya Shkatulka	Green/Yellow	70–80	Heirloom	6–19 oz	Standard	Indeterminate	Regular Leaf			Named after Malachite jewelry boxes. Low acid flavor. Similar to Brandywine. Developed at Svetlana Farm in Siberia.	
	McDreamy	Red	70	Hybrid	Small	Grape	Indeterminate	Regular leaf		F T	Sunstream type grape tomato	
	Matt's Wild Cherry	Red	65	Heirloom	Tiny	Current tomato	Indeterminate	Regular leaf			Ostensibly from the original wild tomato from Mexico. They are smaller than most cherry tomato types.	
	Micro Tom	Red	50–60		1 oz	Cherry	Micro Determinate	Regular Leaf			Considered world's smallest tomato, Micro Tom is a cultivar used mainly in laboratory experiments	
	Millionaire	Pink	80–85	Heirloom	Large	Beefsteak	Indeterminate	Regular Leaf			Ozark homesteader variety from the 1950s. Re-introduced to the public by Baker Creek Heirloom Seeds after being preserved by Ed Henson of Missouri for 45 years.	
	Moneymaker	Red	80	Heirloom	Medium	Standard	Indeterminate	Regular leaf			Popular with grow-your-owners as seed is inexpensive compared to modern, often better, F1s. Blight prone.	
	Monterosa	Pink									A hybrid of two tomatoes from the Mediterranean: the pear of Girona and the Costoluto genoveso, a typical Italian variety.	
	Montserrat	Red										
	Mortgage Lifter	Pink	70–85	Heirloom	16–32+ oz	Beefsteak	Indeterminate	Regular leaf			There are several cultivars of similar tomatoes with this name. The two most famous varieties were developed in 1922 and 1930s by William Estler and M.C. Byles respectively, both of West Virginia. They were most popular during the Great Depression due to high sale-ability. Rich, sweet taste.	
	Mr. Stripey	Red/ Yellow	80+	Heirloom	Medium/ Large	Beefsteak	Indeterminate	Regular Leaf				
	Mushroom Basket	Pink	75	Open Pollinated Hybrid	4–16 oz	Ribbed	Determinate	Regular Leaf		F	Russian variety brought to the United States in the 2000s. Introduced to the public by Baker Creek Heirloom Seeds in 2010. Sweet, mild flavor.	
	Napa Rose’ Blush	Pink	65–70	Open Pollinated Hybrid		Cherry	Indeterminate	Regular Leaf			Developed by Brad Gates at Wild Boar Farms, Napa, California. Sweet, rich flavor.	
	Orange Hat	Orange		Open Pollinated Hybrid	Tiny	Cherry	Micro Determinate	Regular Leaf			Balanced flavor.	
	Orange Icicle	Orange	70–75	Open Pollinated Hybrid	Medium	Elongated	Indeterminate	Wispy Regular Leaf			Sweet, rich, citrus flavor.	
	Pantano Romanesco	Red	70–80	Heirloom	Medium/ Large	Round	Indeterminate	Regular leaf			Rich, complex flavor. Heavy yield. Excellent all round tomato.	
	Paul Robeson	Burgundy	90	Heirloom	6–12 oz	Beefsteak	Indeterminate	Regular leaf			This Russian heirloom was made available by Marina Danilenko. Named after opera singer and rights activist Paul Robeson. Sweet, smoky flavor.	
	Pink Boar	Variegated Pink/Green	70–80	Open Pollinated Hybrid	2–4 oz	Round	Indeterminate	Regular Leaf			Developed by Brad Gates at Wild Boar Farms. Rich, sweet flavor.	
	Plum tomato	Red									Looks almost identical with Roma tomato	
	Raf tomato	Red										
	Raspberry Lyanna	Pink		Open Pollinated Hybrid	6–10 oz	Oblate	Semi-Determinate	Regular Leaf	Canning Slicing		Sweet, rich flavor.	
	Rebekah Allen	Pink	65–70	Heirloom		Round	Indeterminate	Regular Leaf			Some disease resistance. Complex, balanced flavor.	
	Rebellion	Red										
	Red Currant	Red	65–70	Heirloom	Tiny	Round	Indeterminate	Regular leaf				
	Roma	Red	70–80	Hybrid	Medium	Plum	Determinate	Regular leaf		F V	Mainly used for making sauces or canning	
	Rosa de Barbastro	Pink										
	Rosella	Pink/Purple	70–78	Open-Pollinated Hybrid	1–2 oz	Cherry	Indeterminate	Regular Leaf	Fresh		Bred by Gourmet Genetics. Sweet, rich flavor.	
	Rutgers	Red	73	Heirloom	Medium 5.8(originally) now-7oz	Handsome flattened globe shape	Determinate	Vigorous foliage		V F A	Selected from cross between Marglobe and J.T.D. at Rutgers, NJ	
	San Marzano	Red	85	Heirloom	Medium	Plum	Indeterminate	Regular leaf				
	Santorini	Red		Heirloom	Small	Pear					Developed in Santorini (Greece), known for its flavour and body	
	Sasha Altai	Red	57	Heirloom	4–6 oz.	Round		Regular leaf			Seeds given to Bill McDorman when in Irkutsk, Siberia in 1989, by a gentleman named Sasha. Selected by Organic Garden Magazine as one of the 10 best early producing tomatoes in the world.	
Scorpio tomato	Scorpio (Skorpion)	Red	70–80 days	hybrid, true to Type	6–8 cm diameter, 400-800g	Round, oblate, beefsteak	Indeterminate	Regular	Sandwiches Salads Saucing Stews Curries Casseroles	F & bacterial wilts	An Australian open-pollinated tomato variety bred in Queensland, Australia to tolerate humid subtropical growing conditions by Alister Inch while working for the Queensland Department of Primary Industries; 7–13 days germination, grows best in full sun,	
	Stupice	Red	62 days	Heirloom	Medium	Standard	Indeterminate	Potato leaf				
	Super Sweet 100	Red	55–68	Hybrid	Small	Round	Indeterminate	Regular Leaf		V F		
	Thorburn's Terra-cotta	Golden/Brown	75	Heirloom	Medium	Beefsteak	Indeterminate	Regular Leaf	Saucing Slicing		Introduced in 1893 by J.M. Thorburn & Company of New York, but lost when the company went bankrupt in 1921. Re-introduced by William Woys Weaver in 1993.	
	Tigerella	Red/Yellow	59	Heirloom	2 - 4 oz	Round	Indeterminate	Regular Leaf				
	Tiny Tim	Red	45–60	Hybrid	Small	Round	Determinate				A dwarf variety cross bred from Window Box and Red Currant varieties. Developed by the University of New Hampshire and first sold in 1945.	
	Tomkin	Red	45–50	Hybrid	Medium/Small	Standard	Indeterminate	Regular leaf			Sweet flavor.	
	Traveller / Arkansas Traveler	Pink	85	Heirloom	Small	Round	Indeterminate	Regular leaf				
	True Black Brandywine	Purple/Burgundy	80–90	Heirloom	6–14 oz	Beefsteak	Indeterminate	Potato Leaf	Fresh Salsa Saucing		Developed by Dr. Harold E. Martin in the 1920s, it was kept private until William Woys Weaver introduced it to the public.	
	Tomaccio	Red		Heirloom	Small	Round					Developed in Israel as the result of a 12-year breeding program	
	Violet Jasper (Tzi Bi U)	Variegated Purple/Green		Heirloom	1 3 oz				Fresh Dried		Rich, tangy, sweet flavor.	
	Yellow Brandywine	Golden	90	Heirloom	Up to 32 oz	Beefsteak	Indeterminate	Potato Leaf			There are two strains of the Yellow Brandywine. The original variety came from Charles Knoy of Indiana. It was further developed by Craig LeHoullier in 1991 and commercialized. The Platfoot variety, developed by Gary Platfood of Ohio produces higher yields of better-looking fruit. Sweet, acidic flavor.	
	Wagner Blue Green	Green/Purple	95	Open Pollinated Hybrid	~3.5 oz	Standard	Conflicting Information	Regular Leaf			Developed by tomato breeder Tom Wagner.	
	White Queen	Creamy white	70–75	Heirloom				Regular Leaf				
	Yellow Pear	Yellow	70–80	Heirloom	Small	Pear	Indeterminate	Regular Leaf		V F	Smaller seed cavities, lower acidity and firmer flesh make this otherwise cherry-like cultivar a less squirty option for sandwich, salad or out-of-hand eating	
Image	Common name	Color	Maturity (days)	Genetic type	Fruit size	Shape	Growth	Leaf type	Primary use	Disease resistance code^{[exp.]}	Additional information	Refs

== See also ==
- Lists of cultivars
- List of tomato dishes

== Notes ==
1. ^Explanation of tomato disease resistance codes

Some tomato cultivars will be marked with disease resistance codes, signifying that the plant is immune to a certain disease shown below:
- A — Alternaria stem canker
- F — Fusarium wilt
- FF — Fusarium races 1 and 2
- FFF — Fusarium races 1, 2 and 3
- N — Nematodes
- T — Tobacco mosaic virus
- St — Stemphylium gray leaf spot
- V — Verticillium wilt
