= San Marzano tomato =

Tomato cultivar

San Marzano
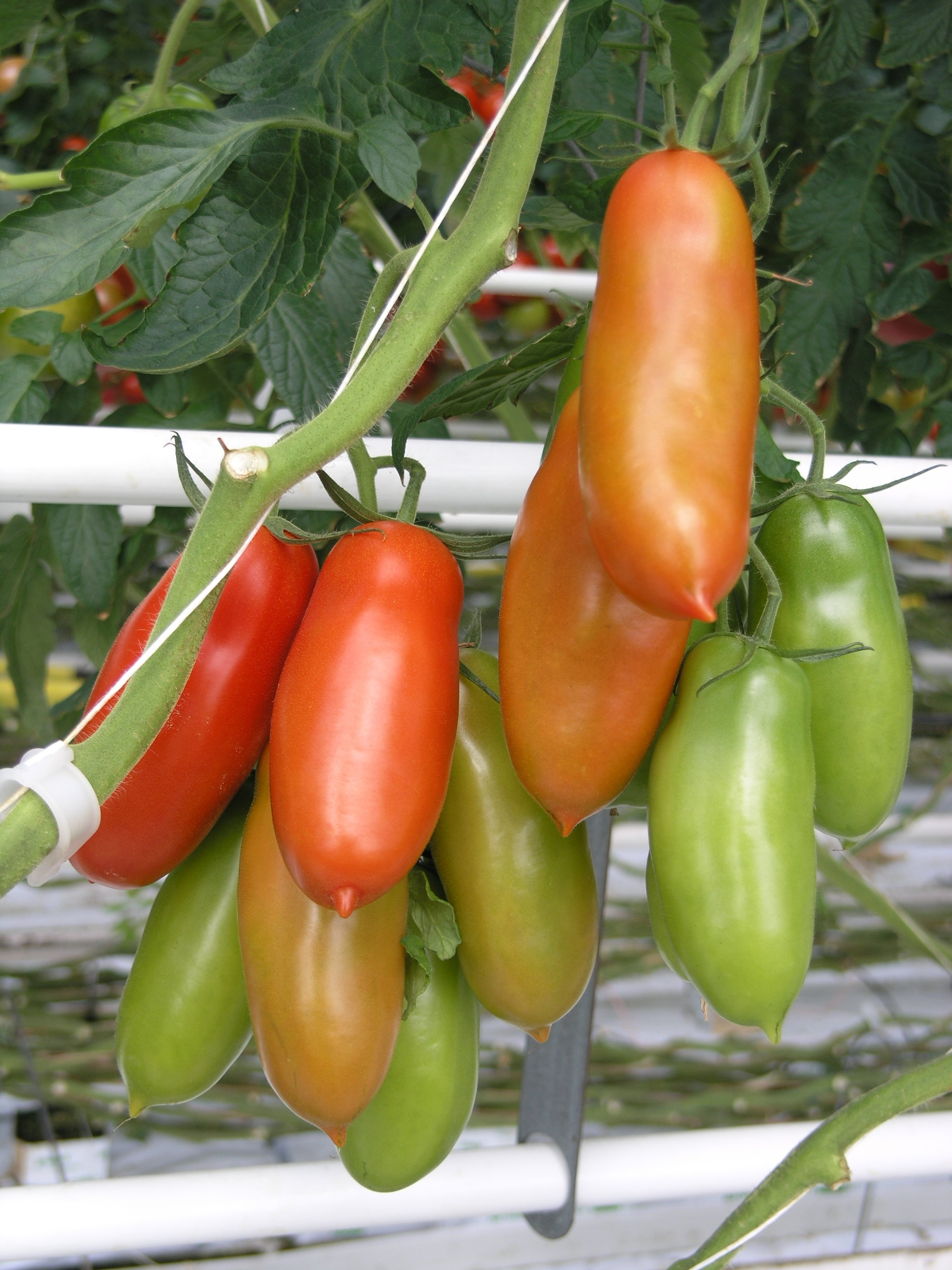
- San Marzano tomatoes

Tomato (Solanum lycopersicum)
- Maturity: 85 days
- Type: Heirloom
- Vine: Indeterminate
- Plant height: 1.8 metres (5 ft 11 in)
- Fruit weight: 110 grams (3.9 oz)
- Leaf: Regular leaf
- Color: Red (pink)
- Shape: Plum

The San Marzano tomato is a variety of plum tomato originating in Campania, Italy. It is known for its flavour and quality as a canning tomato. San Marzano production is protected by a European protected designation of origin (PDO) certification.

== Description ==
Compared to the Roma tomato, San Marzano tomatoes are thinner and more pointed. The flesh is much thicker with fewer seeds, and the taste is stronger, sweeter, and less acidic.

The San Marzano vines are an indeterminate type and have a somewhat longer season than other paste tomato varieties, making them particularly suitable for warmer climates. As is typical of heirloom plants, San Marzano is an open-pollinated variety that breeds true from generation to generation, making seed saving practical for the home gardener or farmer.

== Commercial production and use ==
Heirloom plant conservationist Amy Goldman Fowler calls the San Marzano "the most important industrial tomato of the 20th century"; its commercial introduction in 1926 provided canneries with a "sturdy, flawless subject, and breeders with genes they'd be raiding for decades". Although commercial production of the San Marzano variety is most closely associated with Italy, seeds for the variety are available worldwide. It is an heirloom variety. Canned San Marzanos, when grown in the Valle del Sarno ('Sarno Valley') in Italy in compliance with Italian law, can be classified as pomodoro di San Marzano dell'agro sarnese-nocerino and have the European Union PDO emblem on the label.

Most San Marzano tomatoes sold commercially are grown in Italy, although they are produced commercially in smaller quantities in other countries. Because of San Marzano's premium pricing, there is an ongoing battle against fraudulent product. On November 22, 2010, the Italian Carabinieri confiscated 1,470 tonnes (1,450 long tons; 1,620 short tons) of improperly labelled canned tomatoes worth €1.2 million.

San Marzano tomatoes, along with pomodorino del Piennolo del Vesuvio, have been designated as the only tomatoes that can be used for vera pizza napoletana ('true Neapolitan pizza').

== Origins ==
San Marzano tomatoes originated in the small town of San Marzano sul Sarno, in the province of Salerno, near Naples, Italy, and were first grown in volcanic soil in the shadow of Mount Vesuvius. One story goes that the first seed of this tomato came to Campania in 1770, as a gift from the Viceroyalty of Peru to the Kingdom of Naples, and that it was planted in the area of San Marzano sul Sarno.

In the United States, San Marzano tomatoes are the genetic base for another popular paste tomato, the Roma tomato. The Roma is a cross between a San Marzano and two other varieties (one of which was also a San Marzano hybrid), and was introduced by the USDA's Agricultural Research Service in 1955.

== See also ==
- List of tomato cultivars
- San Marzano sul Sarno
