= Azoychka =

Tomato cultivar

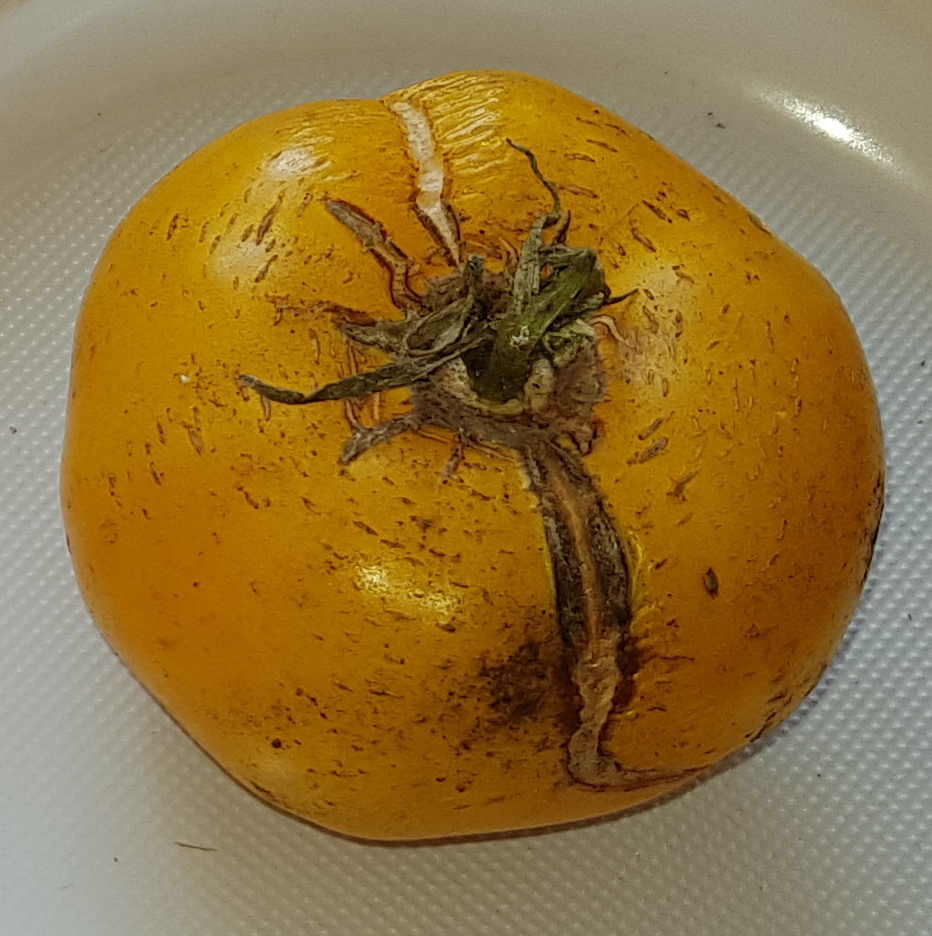

Tomato (Solanum lycopersicum)
- Leaf: Regular leaf
- Color: Yellow

Azoychka is a yellow Russian beefsteak heirloom tomato. The regular multi-locular structure distinguishes it from brandywine types.

== See also ==
- List of tomato cultivars
