= Campari tomato =

Hybrid type of tomato

Campari
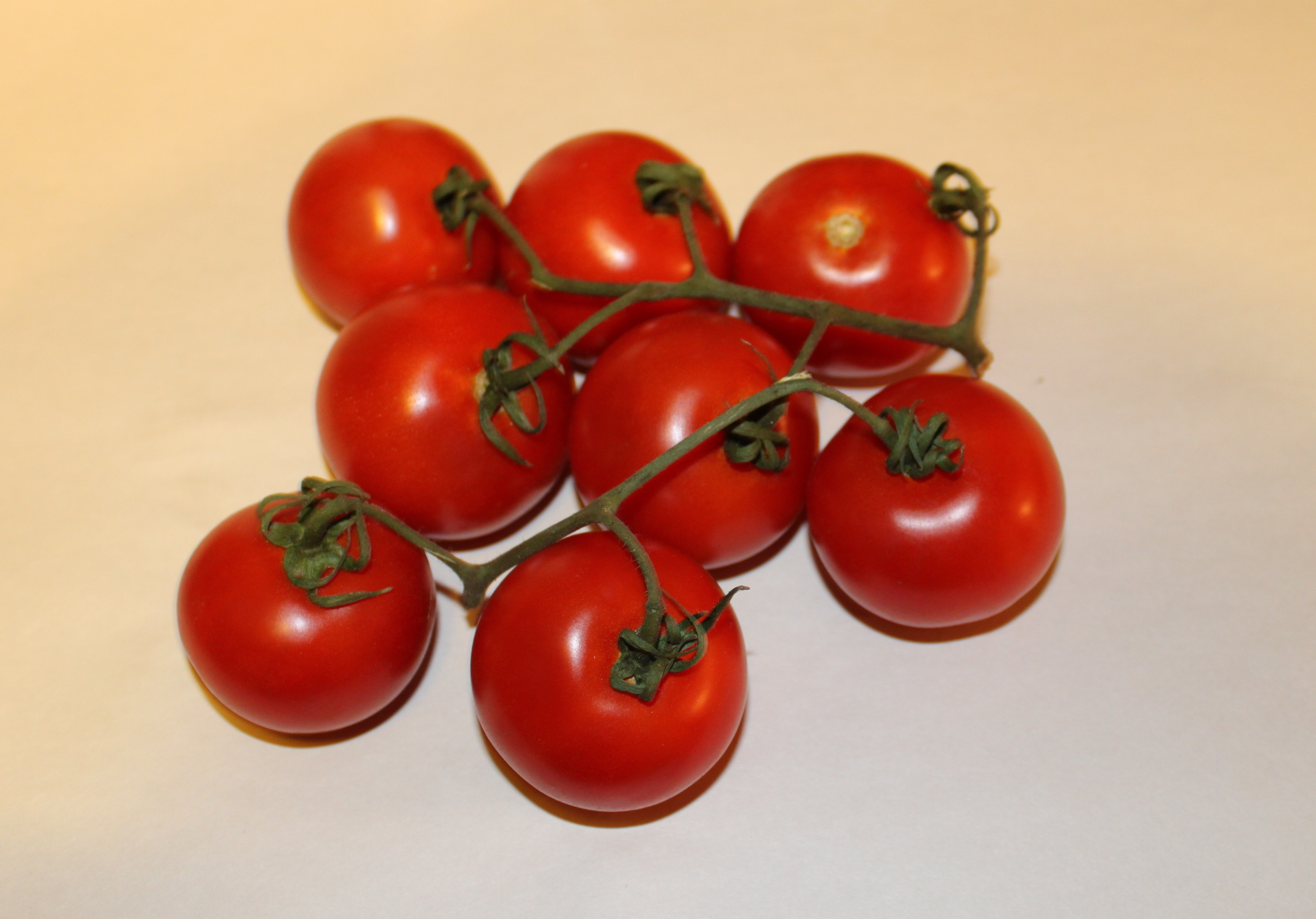
- Campari tomatoes on the vine

Tomato (Solanum lycopersicum)
- Maturity: 80 days
- Type: Hybrid
- Vine: Indeterminate
- Plant height: 6-8 feet
- Fruit weight: Medium (about 50g)
- Leaf: Regular leaf
- Resist.: T
- Color: Bicolor: Red
- Shape: Globe

Campari is a type of hybrid tomato noted for its juiciness, high sugar level, low acidity, and lack of mealiness. Camparis are deep red and larger than a pear or cherry tomato, but smaller and rounder than common plum tomatoes. They are often sold as "tomato-on-the-vine" (TOV) in supermarkets, a category of tomato that has become increasingly popular over the years. Campari tomatoes can be produced from different varieties with similar characteristics, the standard being Mountain Magic. As a hybrid, the seeds cost around $150,000 per pound.

The company Mastronardi Produce registered the term "Campari" as a United States trademark for its tomatoes in 2003; however, the trademark was challenged in 2006 based on claims that "Campari" is actually the general name for the tomato variety bred in the 1990s by the Dutch company Enza Zaden.

== Characteristics ==
A typical Campari cultivar is a globe-shaped hybrid with regular leaves, and exhibits resistance to the tobacco mosaic virus. The plant grows 6–8 feet (1.8–2.4 m), and matures in 70–80 days.

== See also ==
- List of tomato cultivars
