= Roma tomato =

Plum tomato commonly found in supermarkets

Roma
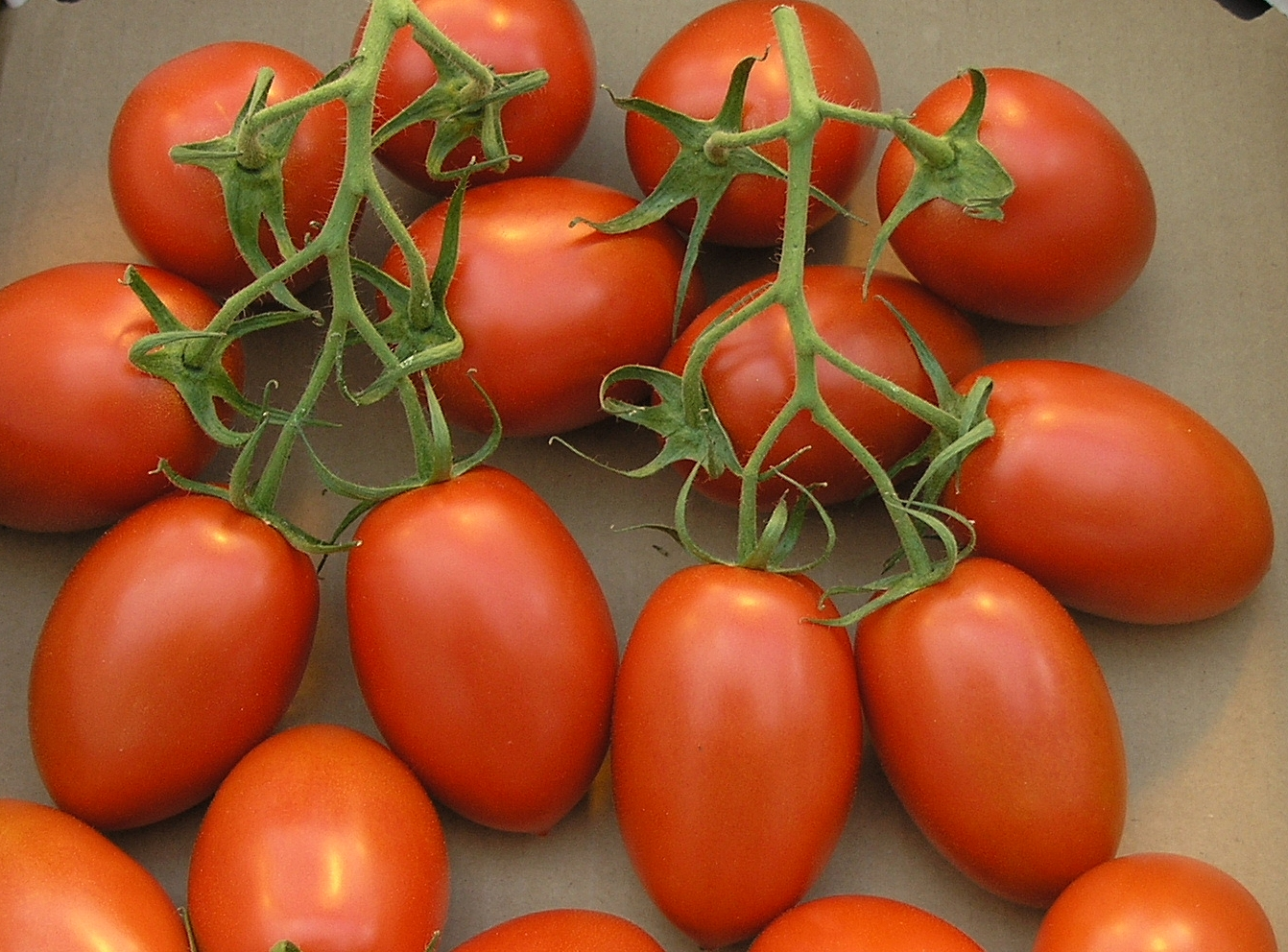
- Roma tomatoes

Tomato (Solanum lycopersicum)
- Maturity: 75 days
- Type: Open pollinated
- Vine: Determinate
- Plant height: 1 metre (3.3 feet)
- Fruit weight: 60 g (2.1 oz)
- Leaf: Regular leaf
- Resist.: V, F
- Color: Red (pink)
- Shape: Plum

The Roma tomato or Roma is a plum tomato popularly used both for canning and producing tomato paste because of its slender and firm nature. It is commonly found in supermarkets in several countries.

Roma tomatoes are grown in the United States, Mexico, Australia, and Great Britain.

== Types ==
The "Roma VF" variant was most common in seed catalogs as of 2007. It was developed by the USDA's Agricultural Research Service (ARS) scientists in Beltsville, Maryland, in the 1950s as a fusarium wilt-resistant cultivar.

While the Roma is an open-pollinated variety rather than a hybrid, it has been steadily improved to the point that most Roma tomato vines are verticillium- and fusarium wilt-resistant (thus the VF in the name).

Most commercial plum tomatoes sold in markets in the Western Hemisphere are Romas or related types. Smaller plum tomatoes about the size of cherry tomatoes are sometimes sold as "baby Romas". A smaller relative known as "Windowbox Roma" is sold as a tomato suitable for window gardens and hanging containers.

== Description ==
Roma tomatoes are egg- or pear-shaped and red when fully ripe. They have few seeds and are a good canning and sauce tomato. While Roma is an open-pollinated variety, in general it is not considered an heirloom tomato. Maturing in under three months, the plant itself grows to 1 metre (39 inches) in height and the single fruit weighs about 60 grams (2.1 ounces). Roma tomatoes are one of the best varieties for canning due to their lower water content.

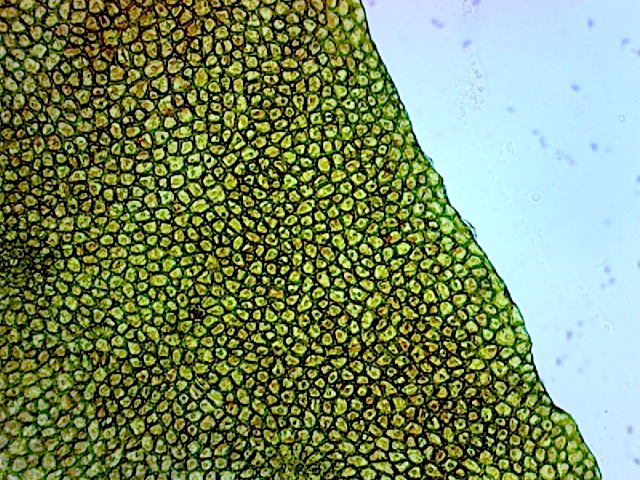
Roma tomato skin cells at 60x magnification

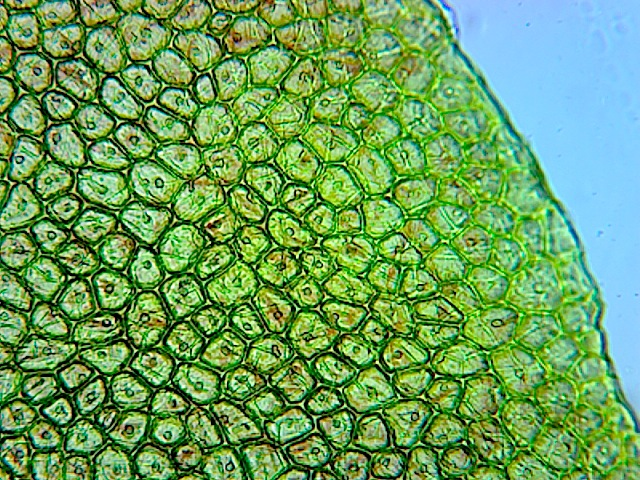
Roma tomato skin cells at 150x magnification

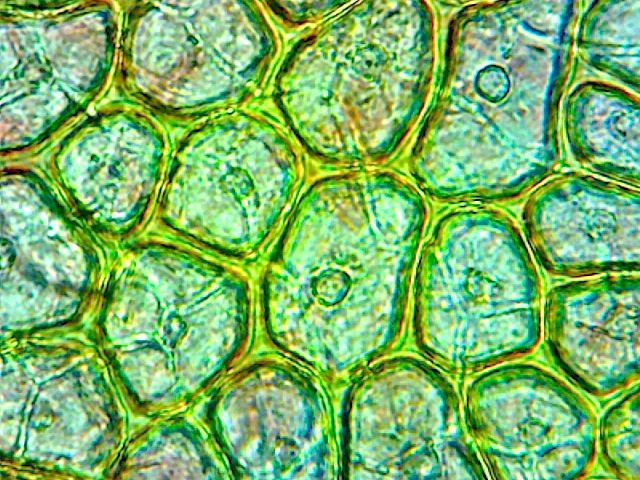
Roma tomato skin cells at 600x magnification

== See also ==
- San Marzano tomato
- List of tomato cultivars
