= Garden Peach =

Tomato cultivar

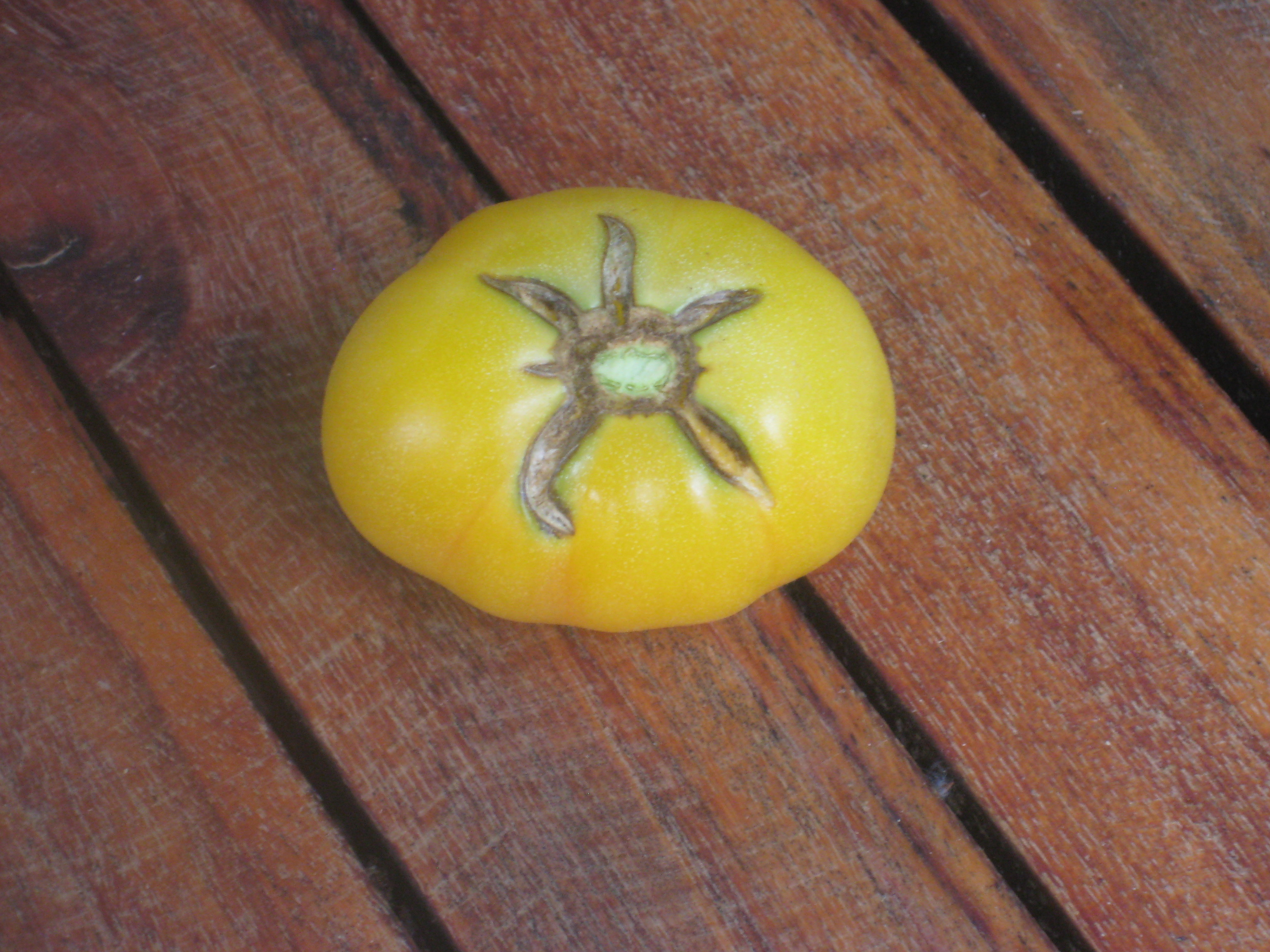
- A single Garden Peach

Tomato (Solanum lycopersicum)
- Maturity: 80 days
- Type: Heirloom
- Vine: Indeterminate
- Plant height: 9 feet
- Fruit weight: 4 oz
- Leaf: Regular leaf
- Color: Yellow, blushes faint, mottled pink when ripe
- Shape: Globe

Garden Peach tomatoes are a cultivar of tomato, native South American fruit mainly from Peru. Its small, bright yellow fruit is the standard globe shape of tomato. With its yellow coloring, blushing vaguely pink mottling when very ripe, and fuzzy skin, it resembles a peach. This cultivar is also extremely prolific. It is rich in iron and vitamin B_{5}. The plant grows naturally between 200 and 1,000 metres from Colombia to Ecuador and Perú.

Studies have shown they may lower cholesterol when eaten, or their juice drunk, regularly, similar to oranges or orange juice, but with a greater effect.

This heirloom is colored exactly like a peach and has a sweet mild flavor. Fruits are 2-4 oz. and perfect for salads. The vines are prolific and very easy to grow in poor soil. Garden Peaches have soft fuzzy skins and mature in 65 days on average. They are suited to containers.

== See also ==
- List of tomato cultivars
