= Jersey Boy tomato =

Tomato cultivar

The Jersey Boy tomato (Lycopersicon lycopersicum) is a type of beefsteak tomato in the family Solanaceae, a hybrid cultivar of the Rutgers and the Brandywine tomatoes by Burpee Seeds. It made its first appearance as commercial seed registered 2014 and released circa 2015.

Burpee dubs it the “Supertomato” because it draws the best attributes of another hybrid and the heirloom Brandywine. The 8 oz. to 10 oz. fruits combine the Brandywine's sweet-sour with the Rutgers classic rich color, thicker skin, and yield. The plant does not seed. Its flowers are sterile.

== Notables ==
Days to Maturity: 70-75 Fruit size: 8" to 10" Plant height: 36-48" 90-120 cm. Recommended spacing: 18-24" 45-60 cm. Sun: Full Sun Hazard: Parts of plant are poisonous if ingested Fruit Bearing: Indeterminate. Fruit shape: Flattened globe
