= Fourth of July tomato =

Tomato variety

4th of July

Tomato (Solanum lycopersicum)
- Maturity: 49 days
- Type: Hybrid
- Vine: Indeterminate
- Plant height: 36-40 inches (91.44-101.60 cm)
- Fruit weight: 4 oz (113.40 g)
- Leaf: Regular leaf
- Color: Red (pink)
- Shape: Globe

The Fourth of July tomato variety is a common cultivar of tomato plants. This is one of the earliest variety of non-cherry type tomatoes which might be ripe by the Fourth of July, in a typical climate.

== The plant ==
Fourth of July tomatoes grow on indeterminate plants with regular-type leaves that are between 2 and 5 inches long and up to 3 inches wide.

== The tomato ==
The Fourth of July tomato plant produce 4-ounce tomatoes that are bright red. This variety of tomato is usually ripe 49 days after transplanting in the ground. While Fourth of July tomato plants are one of the earliest varieties of non-cherry tomatoes, they will continue to produce tomatoes until late summer to early fall, and in some ideal weather conditions they will produce up to the first frost.

== See also ==
- List of tomato cultivars
