= Early Girl =

Hybrid tomato

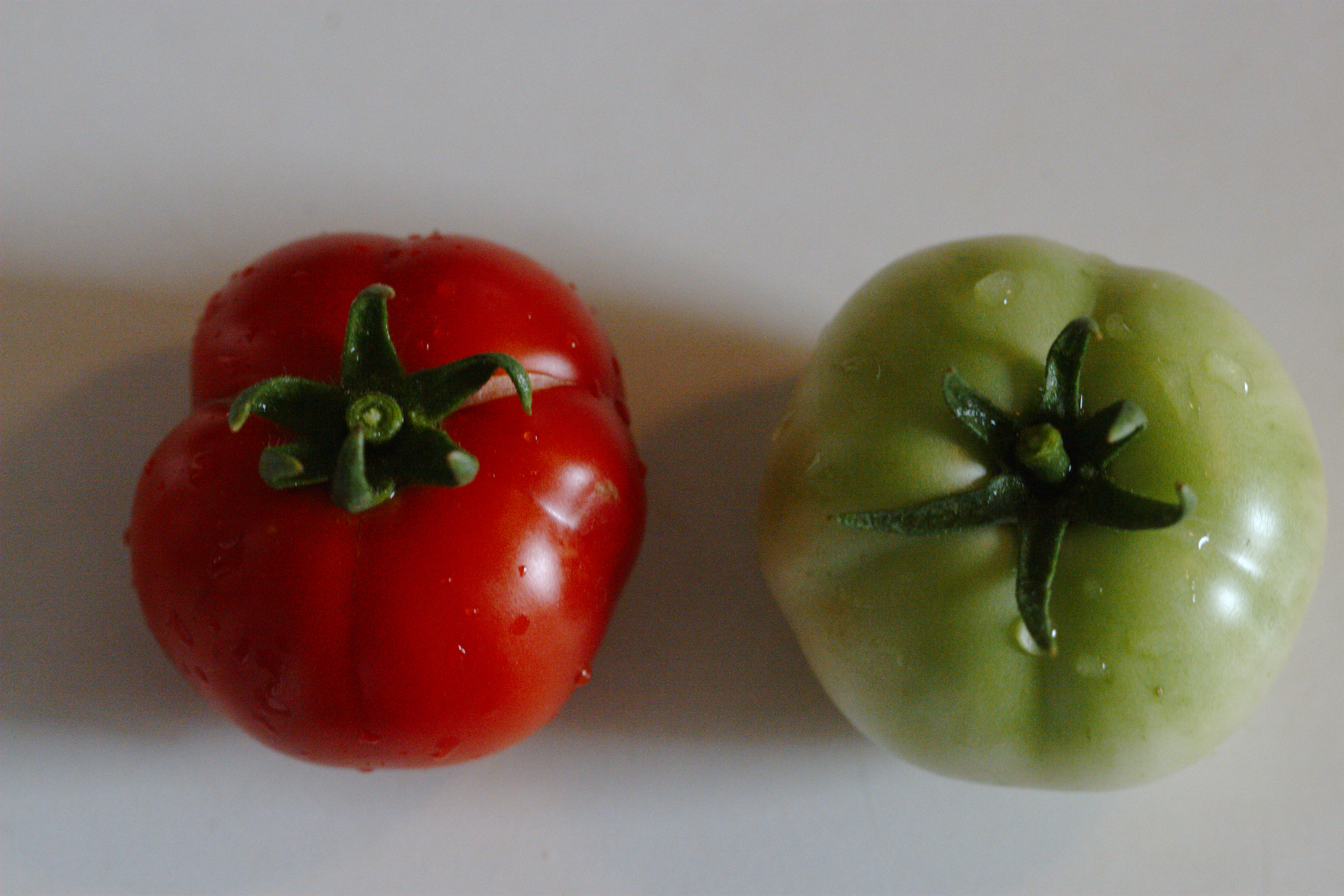
- Ripe and unripe Early Girl fruits

Tomato (Solanum lycopersicum)
- Maturity: 50 days
- Type: Hybrid
- Vine: Indeterminate
- Plant height: 9 feet
- Fruit weight: 8 oz
- Leaf: Regular leaf
- Color: Red
- Shape: Globe

The Early Girl tomato is a medium-sized globe-type F1 hybrid popular with home gardeners because of its early ripening fruit. Early Girl is a cultivar of tomato with indeterminate growth, which means it produces flowers and fruit until it is killed by frost or another external factor (contrast with a determinate cultivar, which would grow to a limited, predefined shape and be most productive for one large harvest before dying or tapering off with minimal new growth or fruit). It grows tall, therefore it needs support as the plant grows. Fruit maturity ranges from 50 to 62 days (1.6 to 2.0 mo) after transplanting, depending on the source, which appeals to growers in climates with shorter growing seasons. Early Girl can tolerate temperatures as low as 40 °F (4 °C) and is well-suited to hot, dry climates. Early girl is reliable and prolific.

The ripe fruit is extremely standard for a tomato, about the size and shape of a tennis ball and weighing 4 to 8 ounces (110 to 230 g). The tomatoes have a bright color and good flavor.

== History ==
Based on a short-season hybrid tomato developed in France, Early Girl was originally distributed in the United States in the early '70s by PetoSeed Company, a major agricultural seed supplier. The variety was named by boardmember Joe Howland to complement PetoSeed's popular Better Boy tomato. Seed catalog Burpee Seeds obtained an exclusive three-year deal for the new variety and featured it on the cover of its 1975 spring catalog.

Since 2005, Monsanto Company is the primary producer of Early Girl seeds after acquiring Seminis corporation and its patent on the hybrid. Though the plant is a hybrid, Early Girl is no longer under plant variety protection.

The Early Girl VF hybrid is verticillium and fusarium wilt (strain I) resistant. The VFF hybrid is resistant to fusarium wilt, strains I and II.

Seeking a way to grow Early Girl tomatoes without relying on Monsanto (a company which many farmers consider unethical), two farmers from the San Francisco Bay Area have worked to stabilize a true-breeding, non-hybridized, open-pollinated Early Girl called the Dirty Girl, but as of 2014 it is not yet fully stable or widely available.

== Dry farming ==
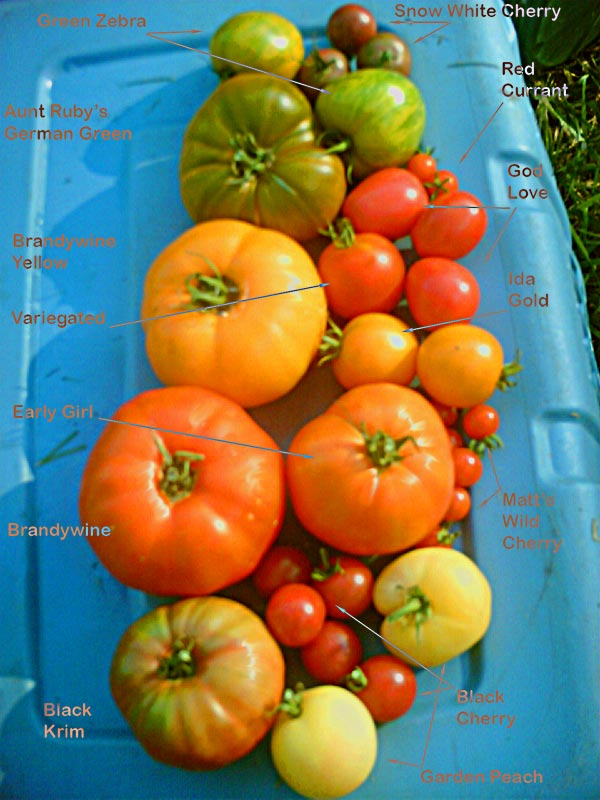
Early Girl hybrid tomato (large, light red on the right), alongside a selection of heirloom tomatoes

Early Girl is well-suited to dry farming. Researchers at the Center for Agroecology and Sustainable Food Systems at the University of California, Santa Cruz, are among those who have described the technique of not watering after transplanting, forcing the roots to grow deeper to seek out moisture, producing more "concentrated flavor" in the fruits, and saving water.

Dry-farmed Early Girl tomatoes have a cult following, and aficionados claim the taste of dry-farmed Early Girl tomatoes rival those of the best-regarded heirloom tomatoes. Dry-farmed Early Girl tomatoes are popular at farmers' markets in the San Francisco Bay Area. Early Girl is also popular with home gardeners in that region, where it thrives, unlike many tomato varieties, despite the area's cool and often overcast summers.

Chez Panisse founder Alice Waters is a fan of the Early Girl tomato, telling an interviewer at Seasonal Chef, "one of the best tomatoes [she'd] ever had was an Early Girl that was dry-farmed up in Napa at a friend's house."

== See also ==
List of tomato cultivars
