= Mortgage Lifter =

Tomato cultivar

Tomato (Solanum lycopersicum)
- Maturity: 85 days
- Type: Heirloom
- Vine: Indeterminate
- Plant height: 9 feet (2.7 m)
- Fruit weight: 1 1/2–4 pounds (0.7–1.8 kg)
- Leaf: Regular leaf
- Color: Red (pink)
- Shape: Beefsteak

Mortgage Lifter is the name given to a cultivar of tomato developed by Willam Estler of Barboursville, West Virginia, in 1922. He registered the name in 1932, several years before "Radiator Charlie" and his "Radiator Charlie's Mortgage Lifter".

According to many sources on the Internet, the Mortgage Lifter was not developed by Willam Estler. Instead, it is said to have been developed by M.C. "Radiator Charlie" Byles in Logan, West Virginia. Byles is said to have developed it in the early 1930s. However, as mentioned above, Byles' and Estler's breeds are distinct cultivars.

The original Mortgage Lifter is known for its mild sweet flavor, and can weigh as much as two pounds (900 g). Byles' and Estler's cultivars are the best known of a number of Great Depression-era tomato breeds named "Mortgage Lifter". These were developed for the nursery plant market, and named for their presumably high saleability, which allowed small-scale plant nurseries and farmers to recover from debt.

== See also ==
- List of tomato cultivars
