= Arkansas Traveler tomato =

Variety of tomato

Solanum lycopersicum 'Arkansas Traveler'
- Species: Solanum lycopersicum
- Cultivar: 'Arkansas Traveler'
- Breeder: University of Arkansas
- Origin: United States

The Arkansas Traveler is an open-pollinated heirloom variety of tomato that was bred by the University of Arkansas in 1968. The plant is indeterminate with round red fruits weighing approximately 6 ounces.

== See also ==
- List of tomato cultivars
- Arkansas Traveler (folklore)
