= Aunt Ruby's German Green =

Tomato cultivar

Solanum esculentum 'Aunt Ruby's German Green'
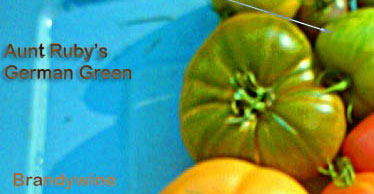
- A home-grown Aunt Ruby's German Green tomato, sitting among other heirloom cultivars
- Species: Solanum esculentum
- Cultivar: Aunt Ruby's German Green
- Breeder: Ruby Arnold
- Origin: Greeneville, Tennessee

Aunt Ruby's German Green heirloom tomatoes are a cultivar originating with Ruby Arnold (d 1997), of Greeneville, Tennessee, but achieving great Seed Savers popularity. They have a greenish yellow appearance when fully ripe.

This tomato cultivar is an indeterminate plant that produces large (8–18-ounce or 230–510-gram) beefsteak fruit of especially irregular shapes, in somewhere between 69 and 80 days. This fruit won the Heirloom Garden Show's taste test, in 2003.

== See also ==
- List of tomato cultivars
