= Paul Robeson tomato =

Tomato cultivar

The Paul Robeson tomato is a Russian heirloom tomato cultivar that was named after Paul Robeson, the American bass-baritone singer, actor, athlete and political activist.

== History ==
Paul Robeson, the tomato's namesake

The tomato was developed sometime in 20th century Soviet Siberia. The person who developed and denominated this tomato is unknown, but according to Atlas Obscura, it can be assumed that its black colour achieved once matured is why it was named "Paul Robeson", as he was one of the few famous African Americans known in the Soviet Union. According to the University of Massachusetts Amherst, the tomato was most likely state-developed or endorsed as it was able to grow in harsh Siberian climates, and that Robeson was honoured by denominating it in his name, as Robeson won the Stalin Peace Prize in December 1952.

== Characteristics ==
The Paul Robeson tomato is an heirloom beefsteak tomato. The plant sets fruits at lower temperatures, allowing it to grow in cooler climates and growing regions. Its taste is described as very flavorful, earthy, good acid and sweet balance. The tomato was named number one for taste in the Carmel, California Tomato Fest, in both 2001 and 2002.

== See also ==
- List of tomato cultivars
