= Super Sweet 100 =

Hybrid species of tomatoes

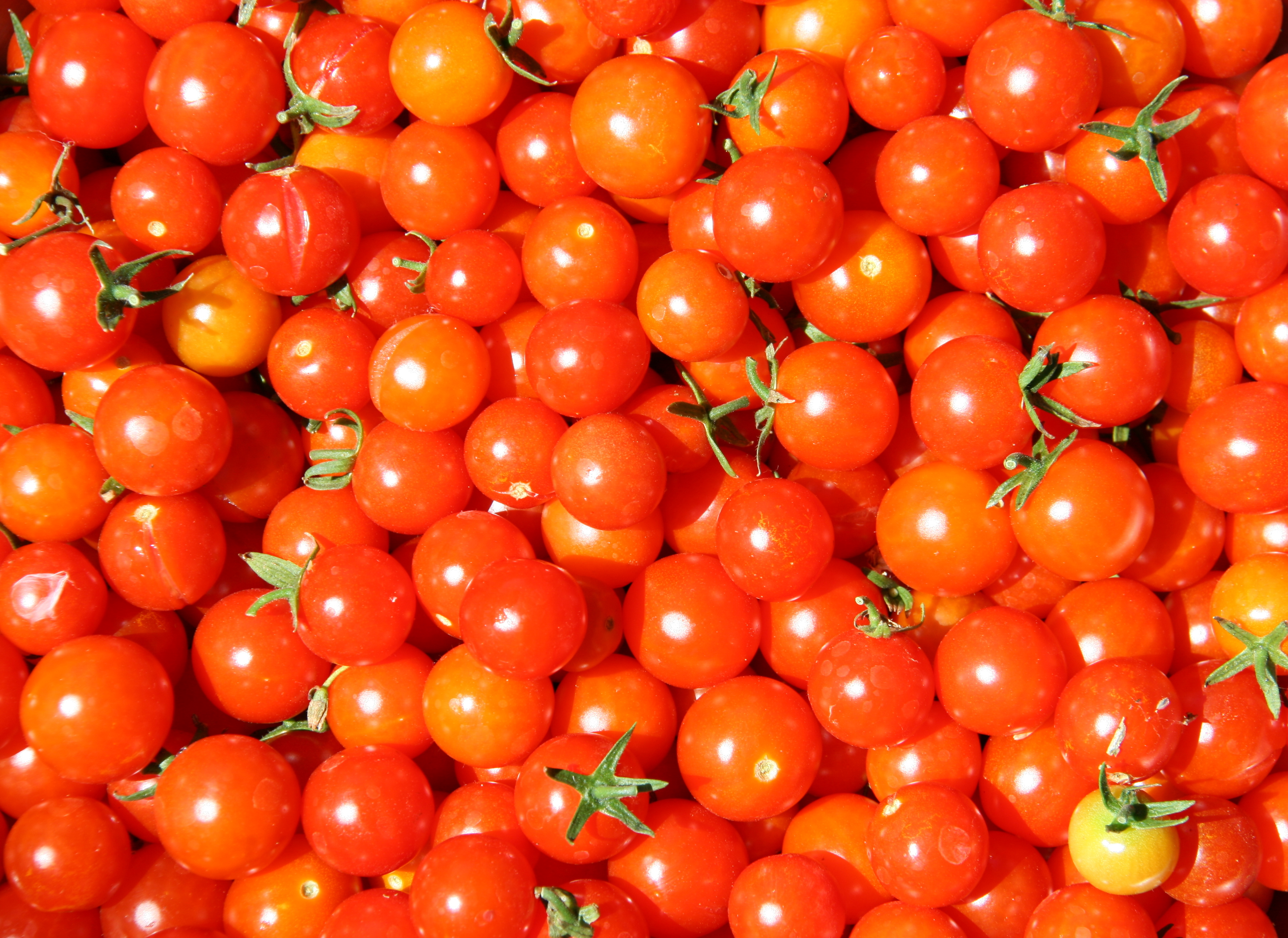
Cherry tomato cultivar "Super Sweet 100"

The Super Sweet 100 Cherry Tomato is an indeterminate hybrid tomato that has long fruit-bearing stems and can produce 100 or more super sweet (extremely sweet) cherry tomatoes. Fruits weigh approximately 1 oz., and are 1 inch across. Plants need caging or staking and produce fruit throughout the growing season.

== See also ==
- List of tomato cultivars
- Cherry tomato
