= Jubilee tomato =

Cultivar of tomato

The Jubilee cultivar of tomato is heavy yielding, low acid, with golden fruit that grow on indeterminate vines. It was released by Burpee Seeds in 1943.

== See also ==
- List of tomato cultivars
- NatureSweet

== Sources ==
"Heirloom Seeds: Burpee's Jubilee Tomato". burpee.com. Archived from the original on December 25, 2015.
