= Tomkin tomato =

Variety of tomato

Tomkin
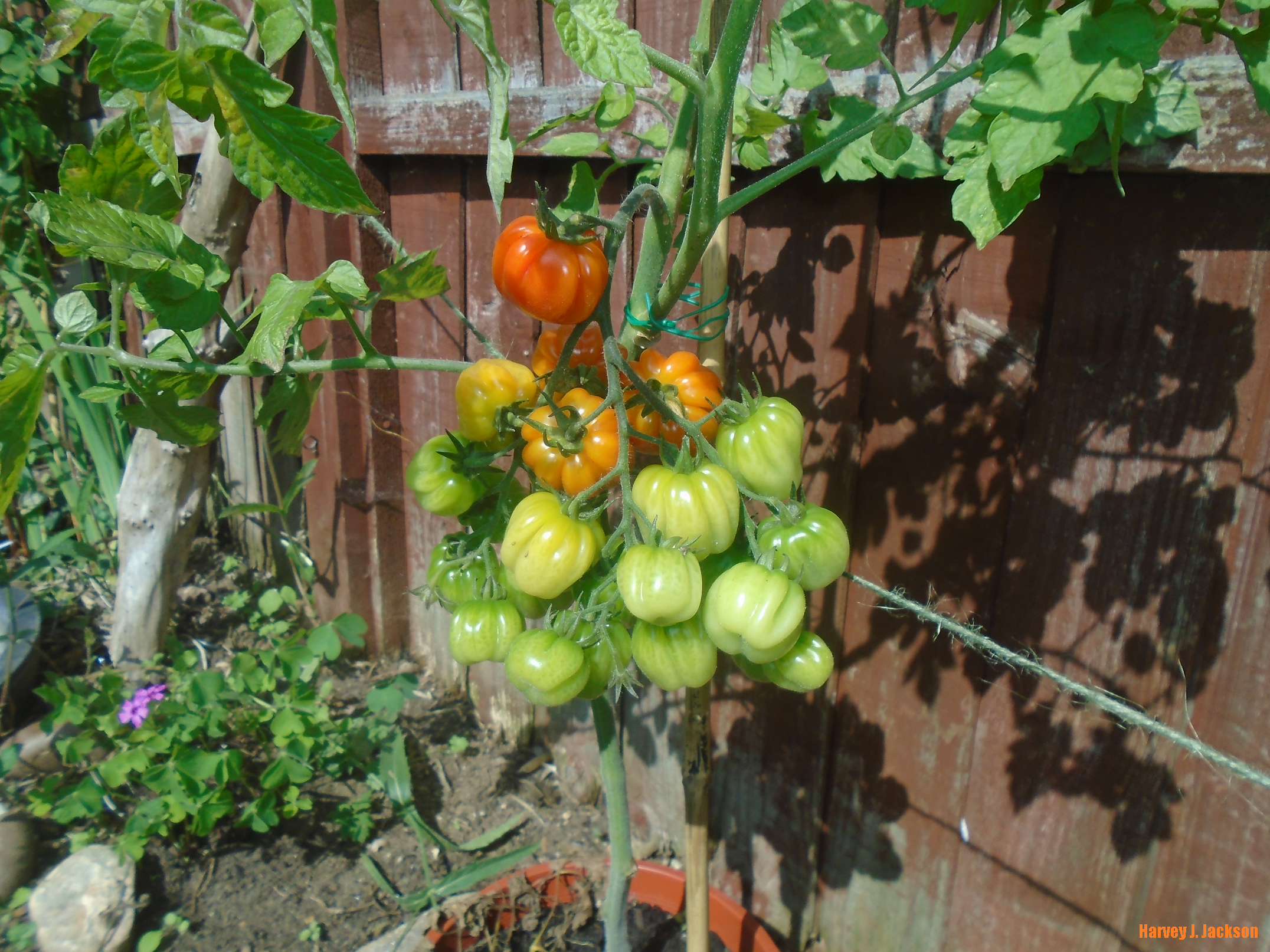

Tomato (Solanum lycopersicum)
- Maturity: 45-50 days

The Tomkin tomato is a small, pumpkin shaped variety of tomato (Solanum lycopersicum) first grown in the United Kingdom by a British farmer in Lancaster.

== Characteristics ==
The shape of this variety is like a pumpkin, hence the name Tomkin. It is similar to the Early Girl tomato in shape, but the size is the same as a cherry tomato. It has a very sweet taste.

== See also ==
- List of tomato cultivars
