= Amish Paste =

Plum tomato of Amish origins

'Amish Paste'
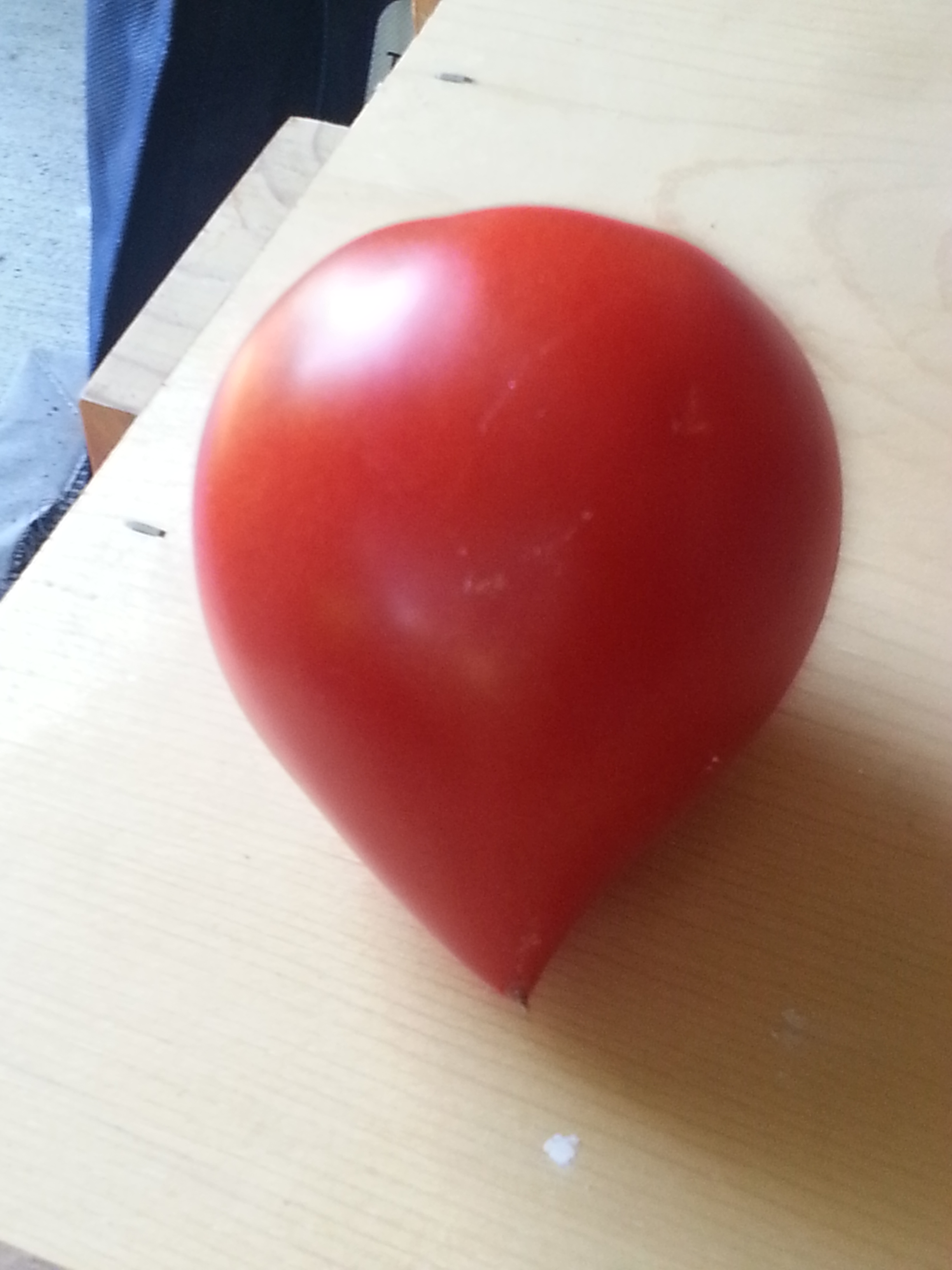
- A ripe Amish Paste tomato
- Species: Solanum lycopersicum
- Origin: Wisconsin Amish communities

The Amish Paste heirloom tomato is a plum tomato of Amish origins, that is used for cooking, although it can be eaten raw.

== History ==
The Amish Paste tomato is said to have originated in the 1870s in Medford, Wisconsin, with the oldest Amish community in the state.

It rose to fame once acquired by Tom Hauch, of the Heirloom Seeds organization, from the Amish of Lancaster County, Pennsylvania. It was first distributed nationally in the 1987 edition of Seed Savers Magazine, by Thane Earle of Whitewater, WI.

== The plant ==
This is one of the larger "paste" varieties of tomato, with fruit reaching 6 to 12 ounces (170 to 340 g). It varies widely in shape, from "oxheart" to plum. Although coreless, it is somewhat seedier and sweeter than normal paste cultivars. They ripen ca. 80 to 85 days after planting.

The plant is an indeterminate variety, growing continually until it dies. (Like all tomato plants, it is a tender perennial, which would not die if growing in the warm climate to which tomatoes are native.) Because it has relatively sparse foliage, the fruit is more exposed to sunlight than a normal plant, making sunscald an issue.
