= Alicante tomato =

Tomato variety

Alicante

Tomato (Solanum lycopersicum)
- Maturity: 55-70 days
- Type: Heirloom
- Vine: Indeterminate
- Plant height: 1-2 meters
- Fruit weight: 2 to 6 oz
- Leaf: Regular leaf
- Color: Red

Alicante is a medium-sized red cultivar of tomato. It is resistant to "greenback", a condition in which the fruit fails to ripen evenly, and produces a reliable, heavy and early crop.
