= Jersey Tomato =

Jersey tomato most often refers to:

- Rutgers tomato, a.k.a. "Jersey" tomato, the iconic tomato hybrid that held 60% of the commercial tomato market in the United States from the 1930s to the 1960s;
- Jersey Tomato, a live album by progressive rock band Echolyn.
