= Matt's Wild Cherry =

Tomato cultivar

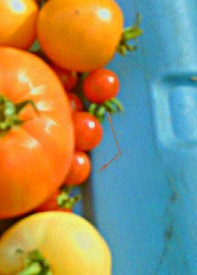
Contrast the size of Matt's Wild Cherry to the Early Girl on the left

Matt's Wild Cherry is a cultivar of tomato ostensibly based on the original wild tomato plants, acquired by a friend of Doctor Matt Liebman in Hidalgo, Mexico. Liebman raised this cultivar in Maine, eventually releasing it under his own name. It is species Lycopersicon esculentum var. cerasiforme.

== See also ==
- List of tomato cultivars
