= Lillian's Yellow =

Tomato cultivar

Lillian's Yellow tomato is a late season heirloom tomato collected by Lillian Bruce of Tennessee. She gave seeds to Robert Richardson, after which it found its way into the Seed Savers Exchange yearbook. One of the few bright yellow varieties, Lillian's Yellow Tomato is a potato leaved plant that requires a long growing season. The fruit is meaty, full flavored and contains few seeds.

== See also ==
- List of tomato cultivars
