= Kumato =

Patented tomato cultivar

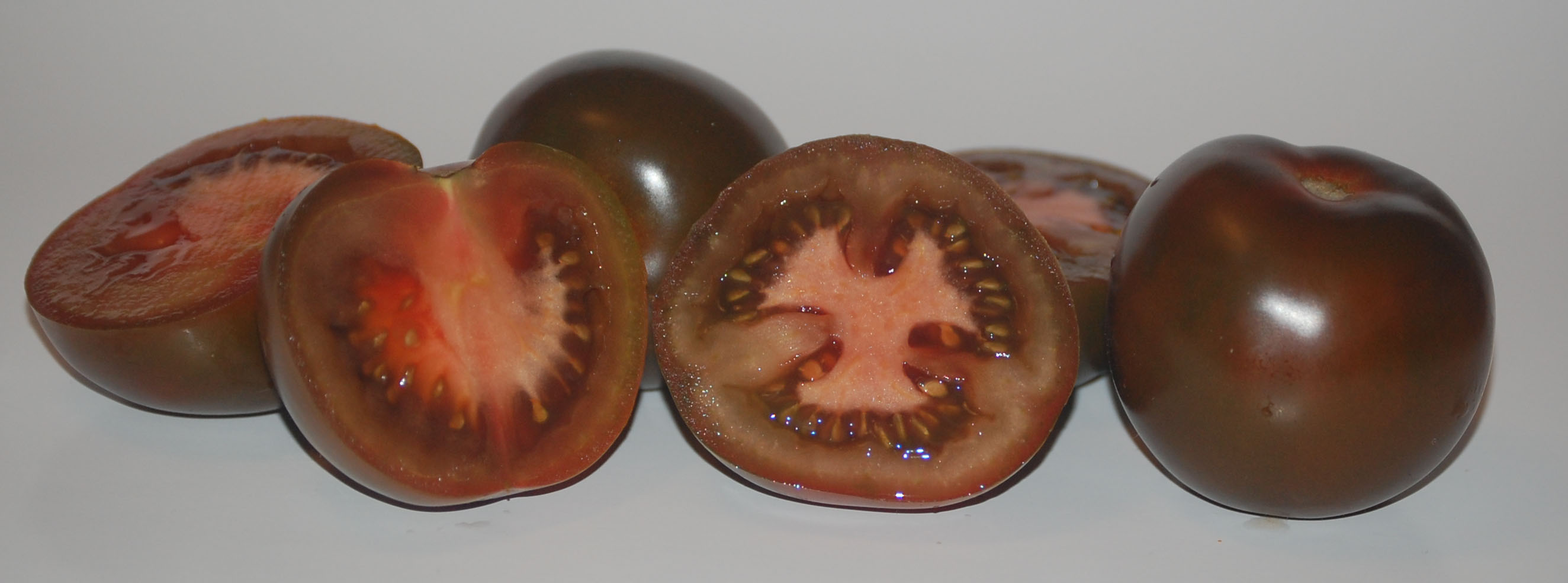
Kumatoes

Kumato is a trade name given to a patented cultivar of tomato developed in Spain called Olmeca, which went by experimental number SX 387. Kumato is a standard-size tomato cultivar weighing between 80 and 120 grams (2.8 and 4.2 ounces). It is firm, with a color ranging from a green to reddish brown or purple, varying in flavor from almost no flavor to sweeter than typical tomatoes due to a higher fructose content. As the Kumato is a hybrid, planted seeds will not necessarily grow plants identical to the parent.

== Cultivation ==
Kumato is grown by specially selected growers in Australia, Belgium, Canada, France, Greece, the Netherlands, Spain, Portugal, Switzerland, Turkey, Mexico, Southern Lebanon, and on the Isle of Wight in the United Kingdom. Unlike the seeds of other tomato cultivars, Kumato seeds cannot be purchased by the general public. The patent holder, the Swiss agribusiness Syngenta, has stated that it will never make Kumato seeds available to the general public as the Kumato tomato is grown as what is known as a "club variety," whereby Syngenta sells seeds only to licensed growers that go through a rigorous selection process, and participation is by invitation only. Syngenta maintains ownership of the cultivar throughout the entire value chain from breeding to marketing; selected growers must agree to follow specified cultivation protocols and pay fees for licenses per acre of greenhouse, costs of the seeds, and royalties based on the volume of tomatoes produced. Typically, Syngenta licenses only one large vertically integrated greenhouse winter producer per country that has well established relationships with grocery chains.

== See also ==
- List of tomato cultivars
