= Big Beef =

Tomato cultivar

Tomato (Solanum lycopersicum)
- Maturity: 70-75 days
- Type: Hybrid
- Plant height: 6 to 8 feet
- Color: Red

The Big Beef tomato is a large-sized red cultivar that is disease resistant. This hybrid variety of beefsteak tomato produces fruits that typically weigh between 10 and 12 ounces on vigorous, tall vines. It combines the heavy yields and plant health of a modern hybrid with the rich flavor profile of an old-fashioned heirloom. It won an All-America Selections award in 1994 and is a popular cultivar in the United States.
