= NatureSweet =

American vegetable company

- Formerly: Desert Glory, LTD
- Company type: Private
- Founded: 1990; 36 years ago in Devine, Texas, United States
- Headquarters: San Antonio, United States
- Key people: Rodolfo Spielmann CEO Frederic Steunou CFO
- Number of employees: 8,000 (2016)
- Website: naturesweet.com

NatureSweet LTD is a San Antonio-based produce grower, packager and seller. The company grows its tomatoes in greenhouses in Willcox, Arizona, and six factories in three states of Central Mexico: Jalisco, Nayarit and Colima.

== History ==
NatureSweet was founded in Devine, Texas, in 1990 under the name Desert Glory LTD. The company began selling tomatoes nationwide in 2012. In 2013, NatureSweet purchased the assets of the greenhouse grower, EuroFresh Farms. To increase production in 2016, the company partnered with Ganfer, a greenhouse vegetable growing company in North America. In 2017, it was reported that the company's Cherubs tomatoes were the number one small tomato in the United States.

The company is vertically integrated. and grows a variety of tomatoes that includes Glorys, Cherubs, SunBursts, Jubilees and Eclipses.

== Certifications ==
NatureSweet's tomatoes are verified as a non-GMO product by The Non-GMO Project and all of its facilities are Level 3 SQF certified.
