= Hanover tomato =

Variety of tomato

The Hanover Tomato is a mostly large variety of cultivated tomato grown in Hanover County, Virginia. While most Hanover Tomatoes that come to market are large fruits, they are not necessarily defined by their size but rather by the geographic setting—normally in coastal soil rich in sand—in which they are grown. The water retention in this type of soil is thought to influence the nature of the mature plant.

== History ==
The first reference to Hanover tomatoes appeared in The Richmond Times-Dispatch, in 1878: "Some fine sweet-potatoes, the first of the season … were displayed yesterday. There were not as great a curiosity as the Hanover Trophy tomatoes."

== Popularity ==
Today the Hanover Tomato is one of the most popular tomatoes in the Greater Richmond Region and in parts of Northern Virginia—a popularity underscored by the annual Hanover Tomato Festival held in Mechanicsville, Virginia.

== See also ==
- List of tomato cultivars
