= Better Boy =

Variety of tomato

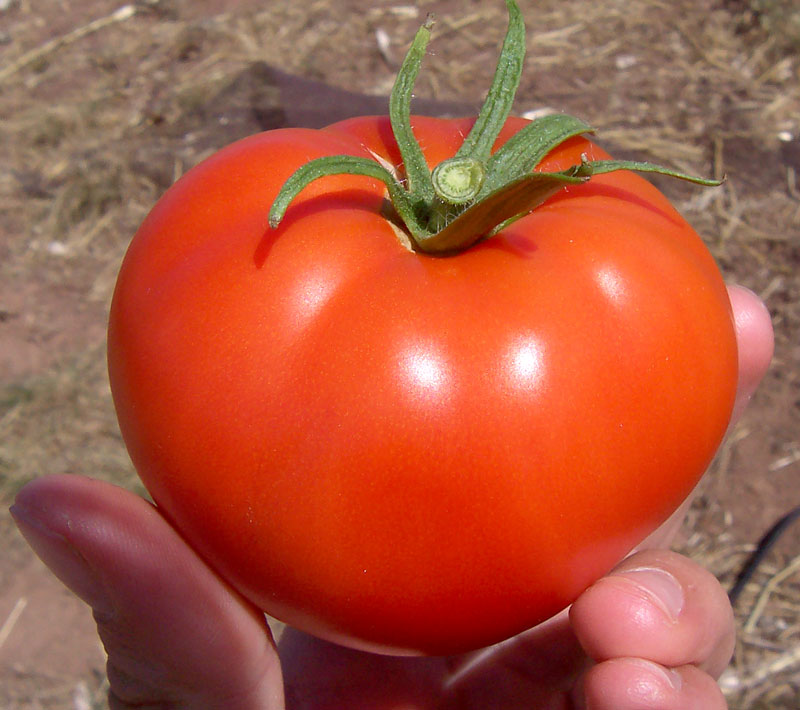
Ripened better boy tomato

The "Better Boy" tomato variety is a hybrid between the Teddy Jones heirloom tomato variety and an unknown red variety developed by plant breeder John Peto. Better Boy fruit grows from an indeterminate plant, growing to about 340 grams (12 oz) in weight, and typically ripens in around 72 days, growing to about 150 centimetres (5 ft) high. Better Boy tomatoes are resistant to both verticillium and fusarium wilt. Due to the relatively high amount of fruit it yields, it is recommended that the Better Boy varieties should be sturdily staked when planted in a garden.

== See also ==
- List of tomato cultivars
