= Raf tomato =

Variety of tomato

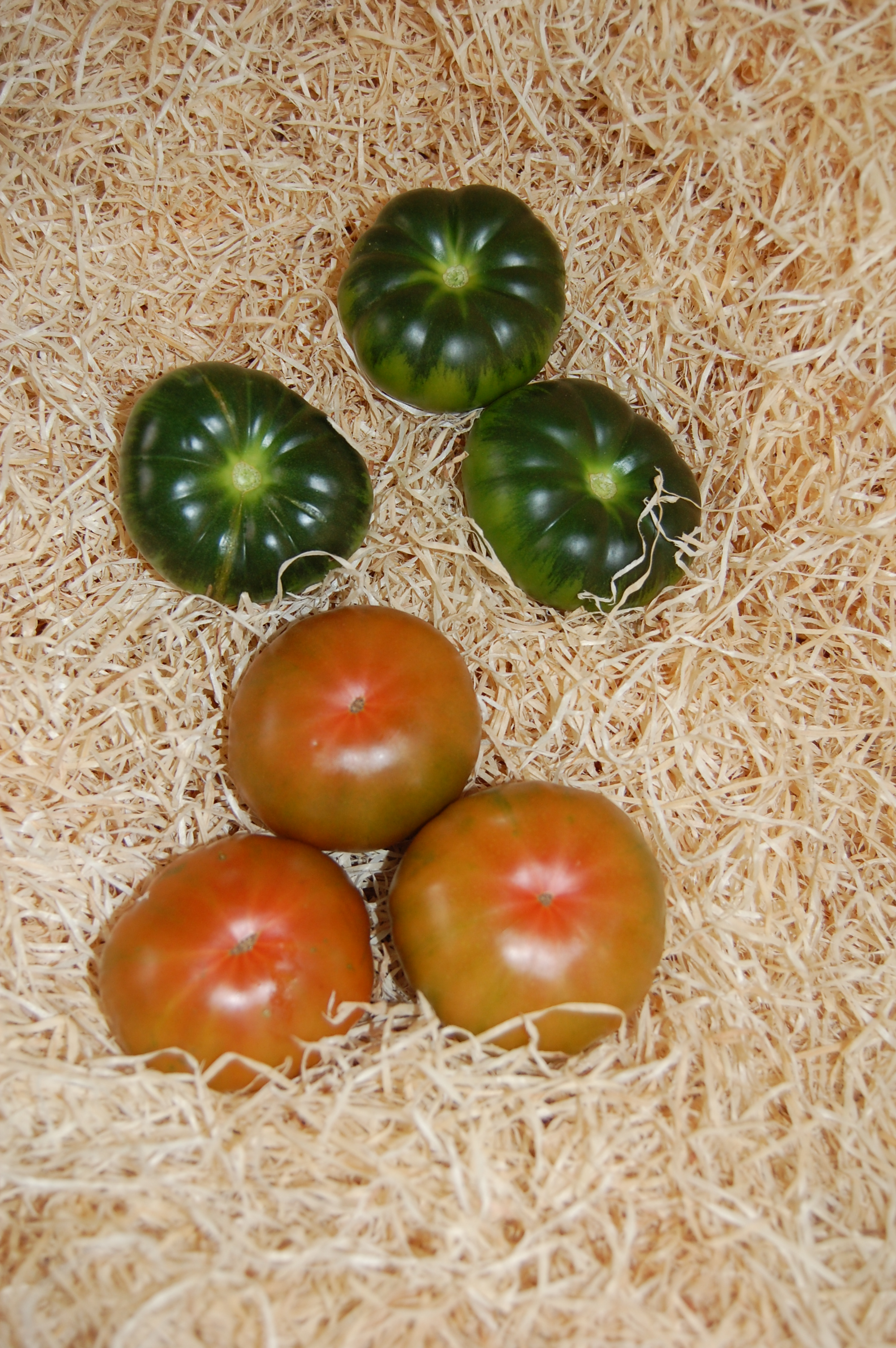
Raf Tomatoes of Cabo de Gata-Nijar Natural Park

The Raf tomato is a tomato (Solanum lycopersicum, Solanaceae) obtained from artificial selection practiced on traditional tomatoes are planted outdoors since 1961. It is originally from Spain. The Raf tomato Marmande is a variety which stands out for its flavor and texture, as well as its resistance to water with high salt content.

The name Raf derives from the fact that it is resistant to a fungus called Fusarium oxysporum lycopersici (in Spanish, "resistente al Fusarium"). This was one of the causes of its popularization in greenhouse cultivation. Raf is the product of a selection of traditional tomatoes so it is not a hybrid tomato.

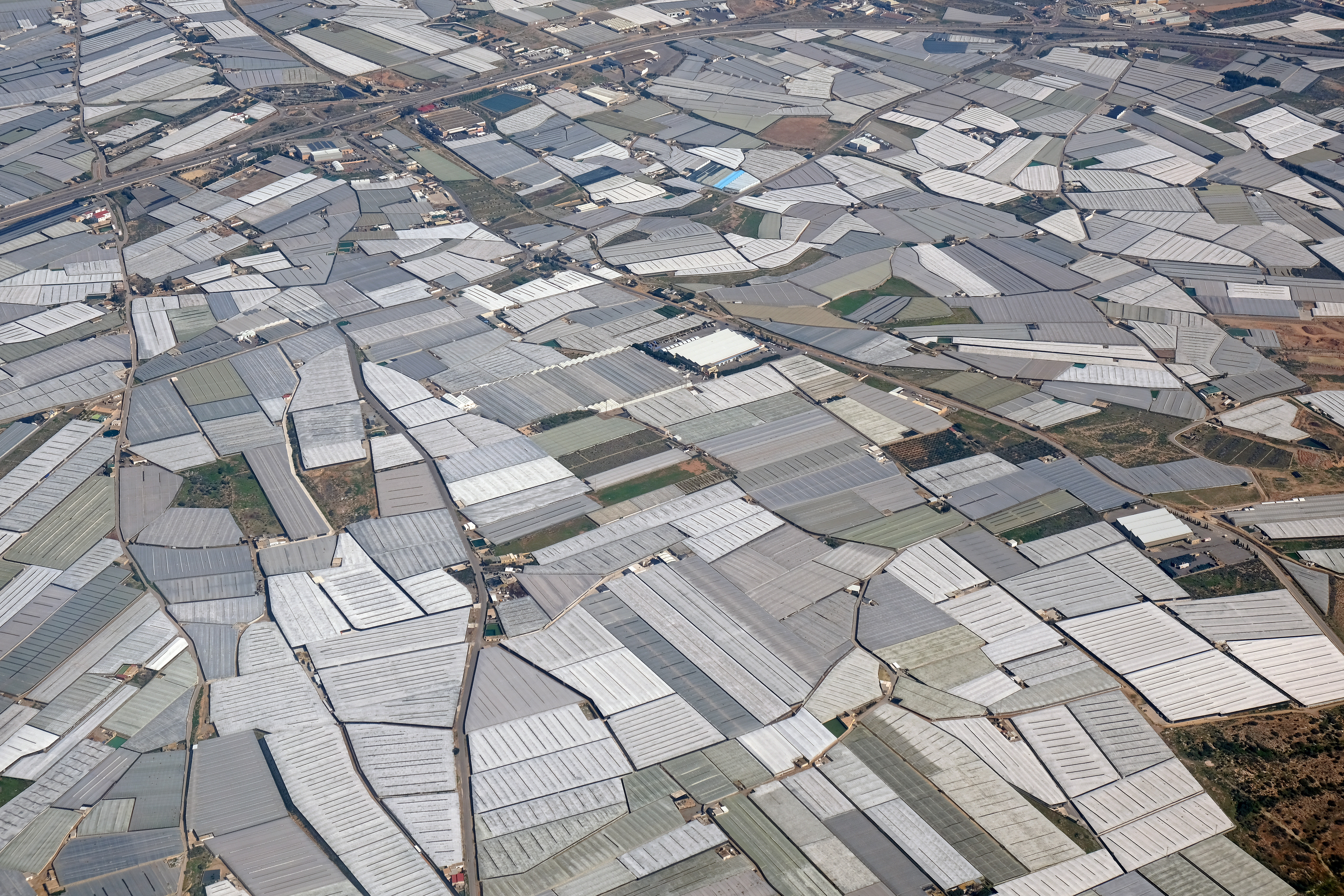
Greenhouses near El Ejido

In Spain, the production areas most relevant to this type of tomato are the neighborhood of Cabo de Gata and the municipality of Nijar, both in Almeria (Spain)- Cabo de Gata-Nijar Natural Park.

== Features ==
Their morphology is special and very characteristic. It is oval and flattened at the ends with deep furrows that end in the center. These grooves make it very recognizable and attest to the fruit's quality. Its color is deep green with touches approaching the black on top.

Inside, the pulp is pinkish, compact, very firm, juicy, and meaty with small seeds. It usually has a sweet taste (9 degrees brix) due to the balance between the sugar and citric and malic acids. Maturation occurs from the inside out.

The Raf tomato is a large plant, but current production tries to reduce the original size on account of transportation barriers. Its natural size can reach 4 meters.

The Raf tomato's unique growing conditions make it a rare fruit. The plants need a certain water salinity to counteract the fruit's sugars. It has been cultivated for decades but has recently been overtaken by more intensive crops. Originally, it was cultivated in the open but is now grown on farms under plastic mesh.

Production is usually limited to about 2,000 acres. The yield of a plant is usually between 4–6 kilograms. The yield of a tomato plant of another variety can range from 20-22 kilograms of product.

== See also ==
- List of tomato cultivars
