= Blaby Special =

Tomato cultivar

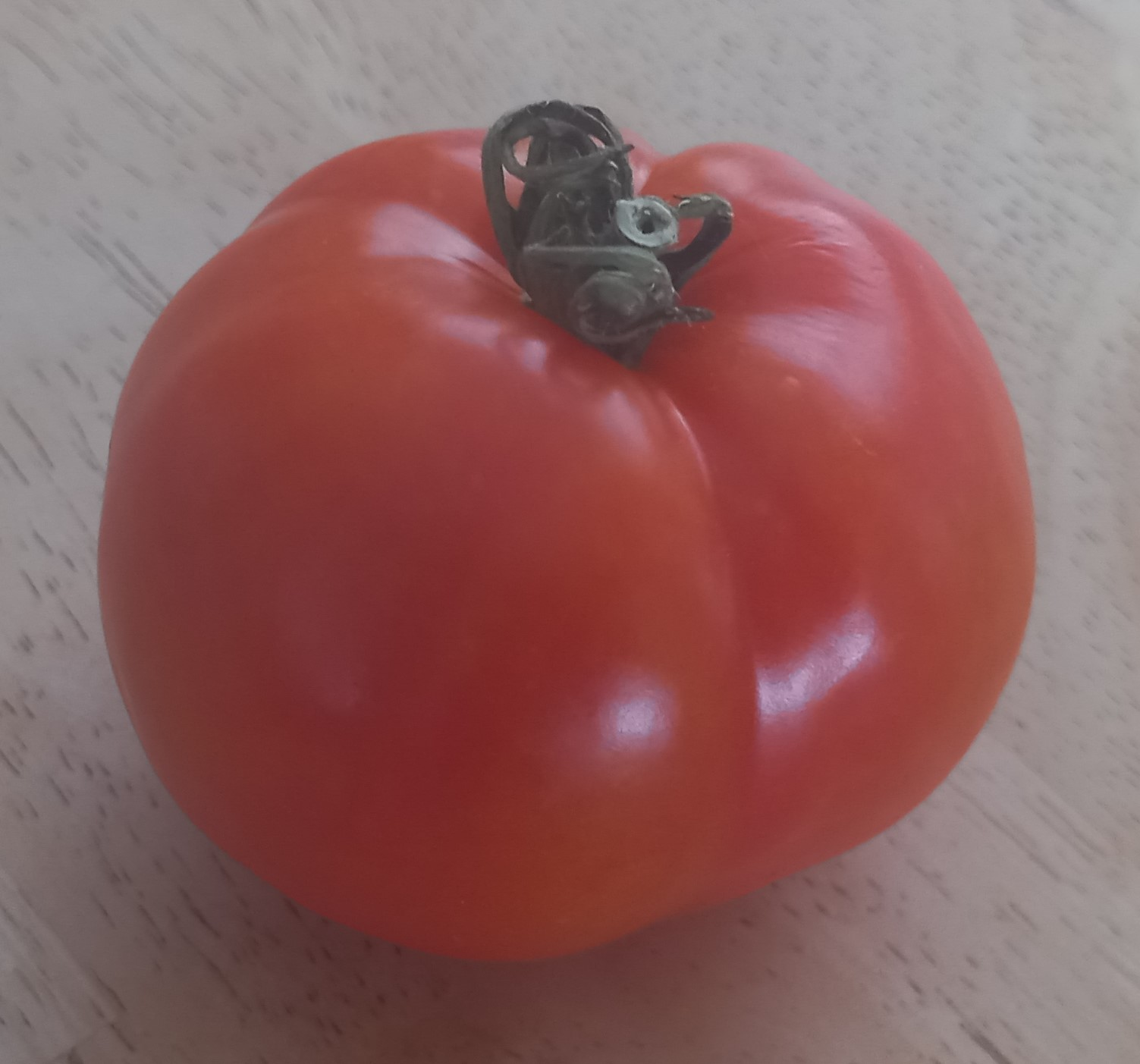
Ripened Blaby Special tomato

The Blaby Special is a variety of red-fruited tomato (Solanum lycopersicum) that was grown in the village of Blaby in Leicestershire, England, until just after World War II. It was the main tomato cultivar available in England during the war. The cultivar ceased to be cultivated when Shoults' Tomato Farm was closed after the war. The variety was brought back into cultivation in 2006 as a result of a campaign by Dr Russell Sharp of Lancaster University. It may have resulted from either a mutation or a cross pollination involving an older cultivar known as Anwell.

== See also ==
- List of tomato cultivars
