= Brandywine (tomato) =

Tomato cultivar

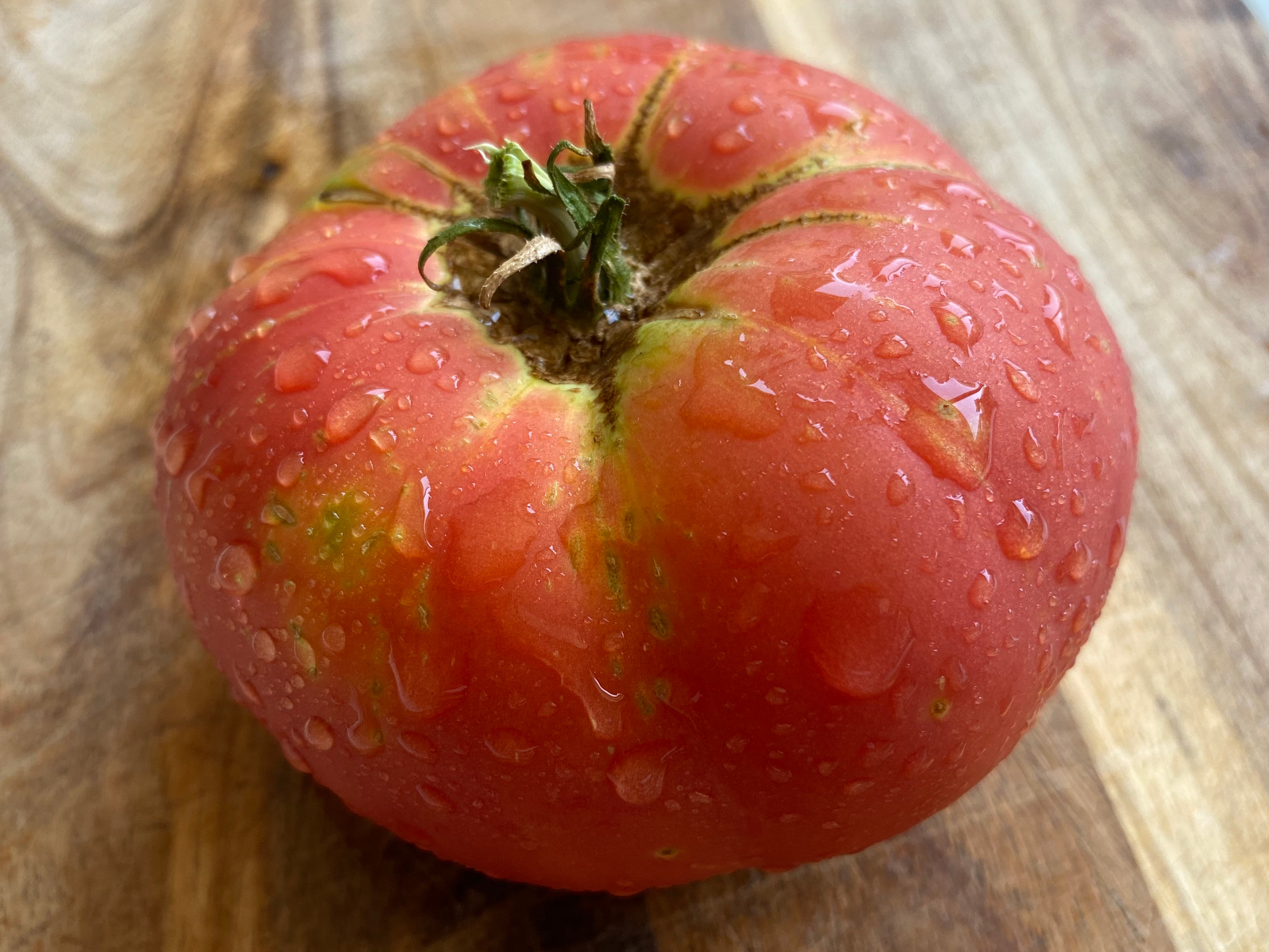
- Brandywine fruit

Tomato (Solanum lycopersicum)
- Maturity: 90 days
- Type: Heirloom
- Vine: Indeterminate
- Plant height: 9 feet
- Fruit weight: 24 oz
- Leaf: Potato leaf
- Color: Pink
- Shape: Beefsteak

The Brandywine tomato is an heirloom cultivar of tomato, with large potato-leaved foliage and large pink beefsteak-shaped fruit. It is popularly considered among the best tasting available.

== Description ==
The Brandywine tomato plant has unusual potato leaf-shaped foliage, with smooth, oval, pointy tipped leaves. Its sandwich-sized fruit can grow up to 1.5 lbs (0.7 kg) and has been described as having a "great tomatoey flavor", offset by an appealing acidity. It has a beefsteak tomato shape, mixed red and deep purple flesh, and can have green shoulders near the stem even when fully ripe.

The plant is heavily cultivated in spite of the fruit requiring 80 to 100 days to reach maturity, making it among the slowest maturing varieties of common tomato, and the cultivar's relatively low yield.

Due to the proliferation of many misidentified varieties the Brandywine is sometimes labeled Brandywine (Sudduth's).

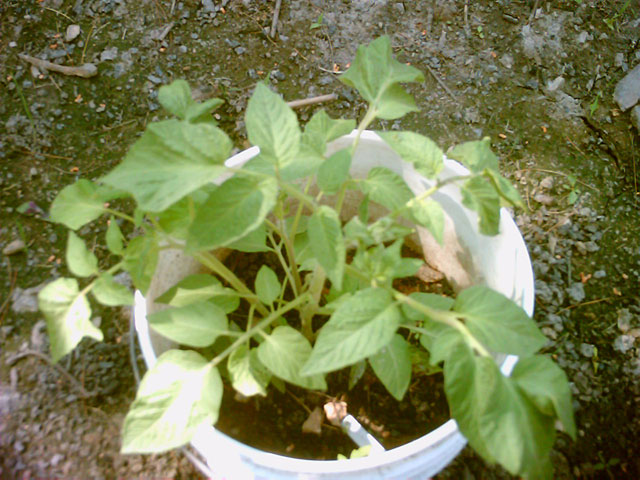
The Brandywine tomato has potato leaf-shaped foliage, rather than the jagged lobed leaf of most tomatoes.

== History ==
Brandywine tomato ad from The Ohio Farmer, January 12, 1889, referring to it as a "new tomato" variety

The origins of the Brandywine cultivar remain unclear. The Burpee Seed company reports carrying it in their catalogue as early as 1886, and there are references to it older than that. Though it is often said to be of Amish origins, there is no evidence supporting this.

== See also ==
- List of tomato cultivars
