= Rutgers tomato =

Variety of tomato

The Rutgers tomato (Lycopersicon lycopersicum), also known as the Jersey tomato or the Rutgers Select, was the most popular tomato variety in the world before the era of mechanized farming began a change in breeding for durability over flavor. It is an open pollinated beefsteak from the family Solanaceae with an excellent balance of acidity to sweetness and much flavor. A true New Jersey tomato has both high acids and high sugars, and a thin skin. It lasts days at full ripeness, not weeks as modern, commercially bred tomatoes for automatic harvest and long-haul shipment, do.

== History ==
It was developed in 1934 by Rutgers University's New Jersey Agricultural Experiment Station and the Campbell Soup Company's Riverton, New Jersey research facility. A hugely flavorful tomato that also was more resistant to rot than its predecessors, the Rutgers tomato became a staple ingredient of not only Campbell’s Soup, but other large companies including Hunt's and Heinz. It was popular on American dinner tables as the seed was grown by farmers nationally.

It was the most popular variety of tomato in the world, according to Thomas J. Orton, a professor in the department of plant biology and pathology at Rutgers University. The Rutgers tomato, at its peak, made up more than 60% of all commercial tomato sales. The Rutgers tomato plummeted in popularity with commercial farmers in the 1960s. Too thin skinned for automated picking, they fell out of favor with both farmers and commercial producers looking for hardier tomatoes that would store longer and travel farther with less spoilage. The seeds were not patented, so farmers and other companies "evolved" the Rutgers tomatoes into more refined hybrids that suited their needs better.

== A second generation ==
In 2006, there was not enough commercial interest to revive the hybrids that were so popular from New Jersey. By 2009, though, Rutgers scientists at the New Jersey Agricultural Experiment Station (NJAES) launched the Jersey Tomato Project to revive the coveted Rutgers (Jersey) Tomato. Scientists had learned that Campbell Soup still had some seed from the parent plants of the original Rutgers tomato. From 2009 to 2014, scientists and plant breeders worked to revive the cultivar through inbreeding, and discovered a change in soil amendment that had removed sodium from the fertilizers used on the soil. Joseph Heckman, a researcher in soil fertility at NJAES, examined other key mineral deficiences in the soil that affect taste, including potassium and boron.

In 2016, after many experimental plantings, tastings, and adjustments in genetics, they debuted the Rutgers 250 tomato, named to celebrate the 250th anniversary of the founding of Rutgers' forerunner in 1766.
