= Determinate cultivar =

Type of tomato or potato cultivar

Tomato and potato cultivars are commonly classified as determinate or indeterminate according to the amount of time that they produce new leaves and flowers. Varieties that produce few leaves and flowers over a shorter period are classed as determinate and those that produce new leaves and flowers for longer are classed as indeterminate.

== Tomatoes ==
Determinate, or bush, types bear a full crop all at once and top off at a specific height; they are often good choices for container growing. Determinate types are preferred by commercial growers who wish to harvest a whole field at one time, or home growers interested in canning. Indeterminate cultivars develop into vines that never top off and continue producing until killed by frost. They are preferred by home growers who wish ripe fruit throughout the season. As an intermediate form, there are plants sometimes known as "vigorous determinate" or "semi-determinate"; these top off like determinates but produce a second crop after the initial crop. Many, if not all, heirloom tomatoes are indeterminate.

== See also ==
- Indeterminate growth
