= Plum tomato =

Type of tomato for sauce and packing

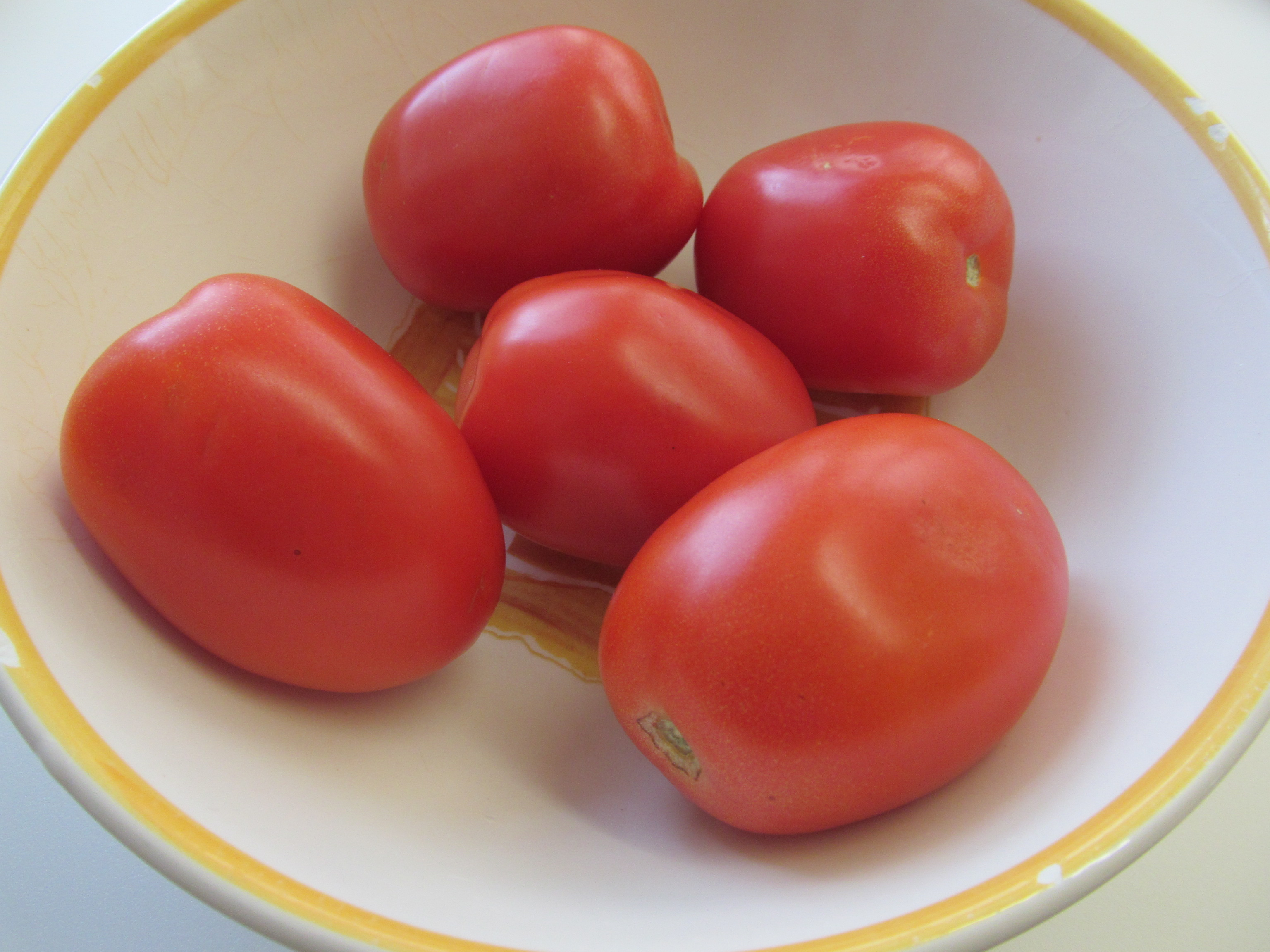
- Plum tomatoes
- Species: Solanum lycopersicum

A plum tomato, also known in the United States as a processing tomato or paste tomato, is a type of tomato bred for sauce and packing purposes. Plum tomatoes are generally oval or cylindrical in shape, with significantly fewer locules (seed compartments, usually only two or three) than standard round tomatoes and a generally higher solid content, making them more suitable for processing into paste. Plum tomatoes are also sometimes favored by cooks for use during the tomato off-season, as they are generally considered more amenable to handling and are therefore available in a state closer to ripe than other supermarket tomatoes.

== Varieties ==
Varieties commonly available in United States markets include Roma VF and San Marzano (semi-determinate; a signature tomato of Italian cuisine), though there are many other varieties, such as the short-season Ropreco Paste and the larger Amish Paste and Big Mama. Five hybrid cultivars grown in California constitute over 60% of total production of processing tomatoes.

Small plum tomatoes (similar in size to cherry tomatoes) are known as grape tomatoes.

== See also ==
- Canned tomato
- List of tomato cultivars
