= Open pollination =

Pollination by natural agents, or true-breeding in plant varieties

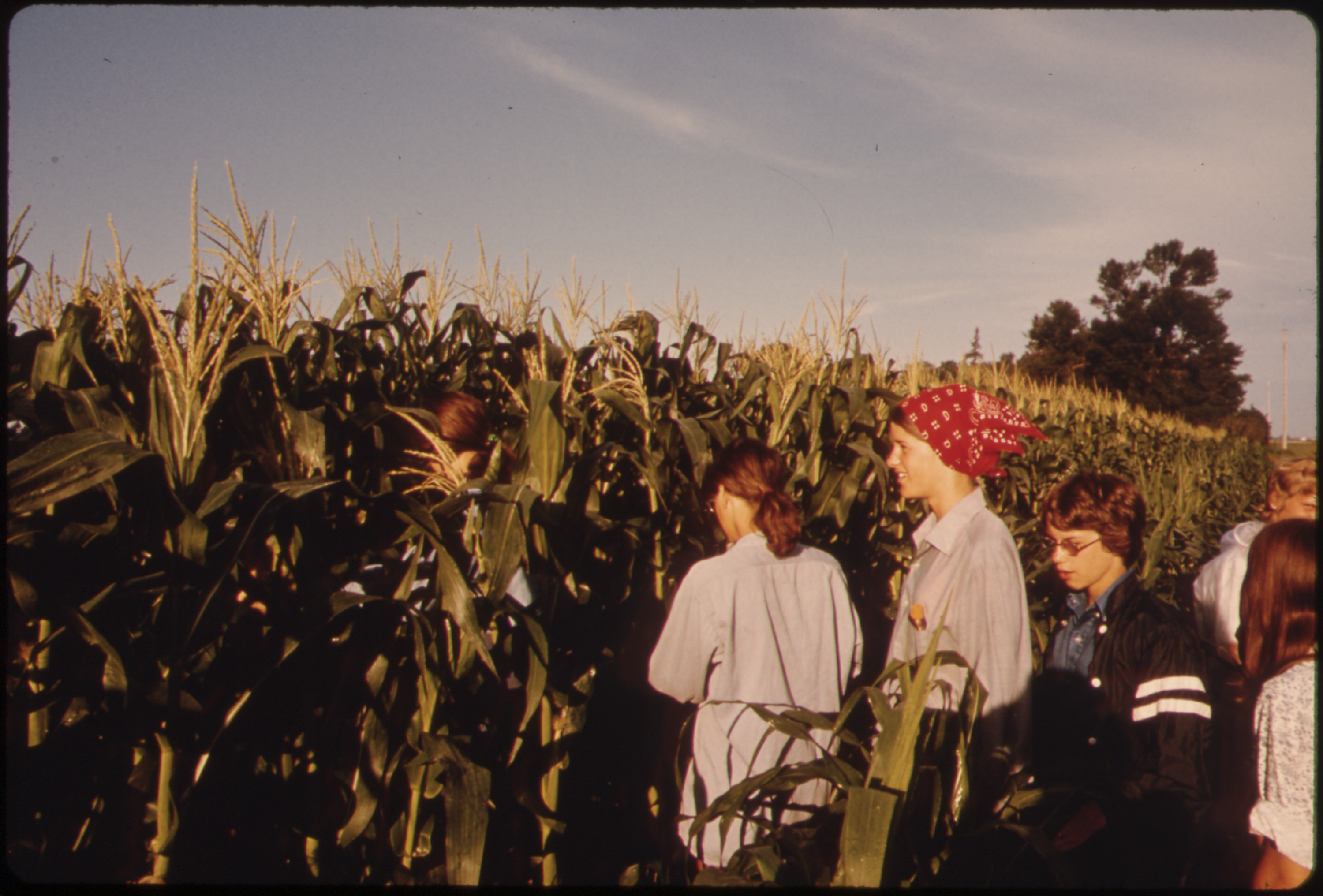
Detasseling corn (maize) plants from one variety in a field where two varieties are planted. The male flowers are removed so that all seeds are hybrids sired from the second variety.

"Open pollination" and "open pollinated" refer to a variety of concepts in the context of the sexual reproduction of plants. Generally speaking, the term refers to plants pollinated naturally by birds, insects, wind, or human hands.

Controlled pollination is the process of collecting the pollen variety from live flowers during the bloom season and processing them, and re-introducing the pollen back into the orchard via a backpack blower or dusting into the beehives. Increased yields can be accomplished and vary from 15% to 25% depending on application methods, timing, and weather conditions. A large variety of stone fruits are receptive to this process, i.e. almonds, avocados, cherries, olives, plums, etc. Controlled pollination is beneficial in times when bee flight either is hampered by bad weather or the lack of bees to pollinate enough orchards during the blooming season. Some growers do the application via aircraft and/or drones.

== True-breeding definition ==
"Open pollinated" generally refers to seeds that will "breed true". When the plants of an open-pollinated variety self-pollinate, or are pollinated by another representative of the same variety, the resulting seeds will produce plants roughly identical to their parents. This is in contrast to the seeds produced by plants that are the result of a recent cross (such as, but not confined to, an F1 hybrid), which are likely to show a wide variety of differing characteristics. Open-pollinated varieties are also often referred to as standard varieties or, when the seeds have been saved across generations or across several decades, heirloom varieties. While heirlooms are usually open-pollinated, open-pollinated seeds are not necessarily heirlooms; open-pollinated varieties are still being developed.

One of the challenges in maintaining an open-pollinated variety is avoiding introduction of pollen from other strains. Based on how broadly the pollen for the plant tends to disperse, it can be controlled to varying degrees by greenhouses, tall wall enclosures, field isolation, or other techniques.

Because they breed true, the seeds of open-pollinated plants are often saved by home gardeners and farmers. Popular examples of open-pollinated plants include heirloom tomatoes, beans, peas, and many other garden vegetables.

== Uncontrolled pollination definition ==
A second use of the term "open pollination" refers to pollination by insects, birds, wind, or other natural mechanisms. This can be contrasted with cleistogamy, closed pollination, which is one of the many types of self pollination.

When used in this sense, open pollination may contrast with controlled pollination, a procedure used to ensure that all seeds of a crop are descended from parents with known traits, and are therefore more likely to have the desired traits.

The seeds of open-pollinated plants will produce new generations of those plants; however, because breeding is uncontrolled and the pollen (male parent) source is unknown, open pollination may result in plants that vary widely in genetic traits. Open pollination may increase biodiversity.

Some plants (such as many crops) are primarily self pollenizing and also breed true, so that even under open pollination conditions the next generation will be (almost) the same. Even among true breeding organisms, some variation due to genetic recombination or to mutation can produce a few "off types".

== Relationship to hybridization ==
Hybrid pollination, a type of controlled pollination in which the pollen comes from a different strain (or species), can be used to increase crop suitability, especially through heterosis. The resulting hybrid strain can sometimes be inbred and selected for desired traits until a strain that breeds true by open pollination is achieved. The result is referred to as an inbred hybrid strain.

To add some confusion, the term hybrid inbred applies to hybrids that are made from selected inbred lines that have certain desired characteristics (see inbreeding). The latter type of hybrid is sometimes designated F1 hybrid, i.e. the first hybrid (filial) generation whose parents were (different) inbred lines.
