= Beefsteak tomato =

Variety of tomato

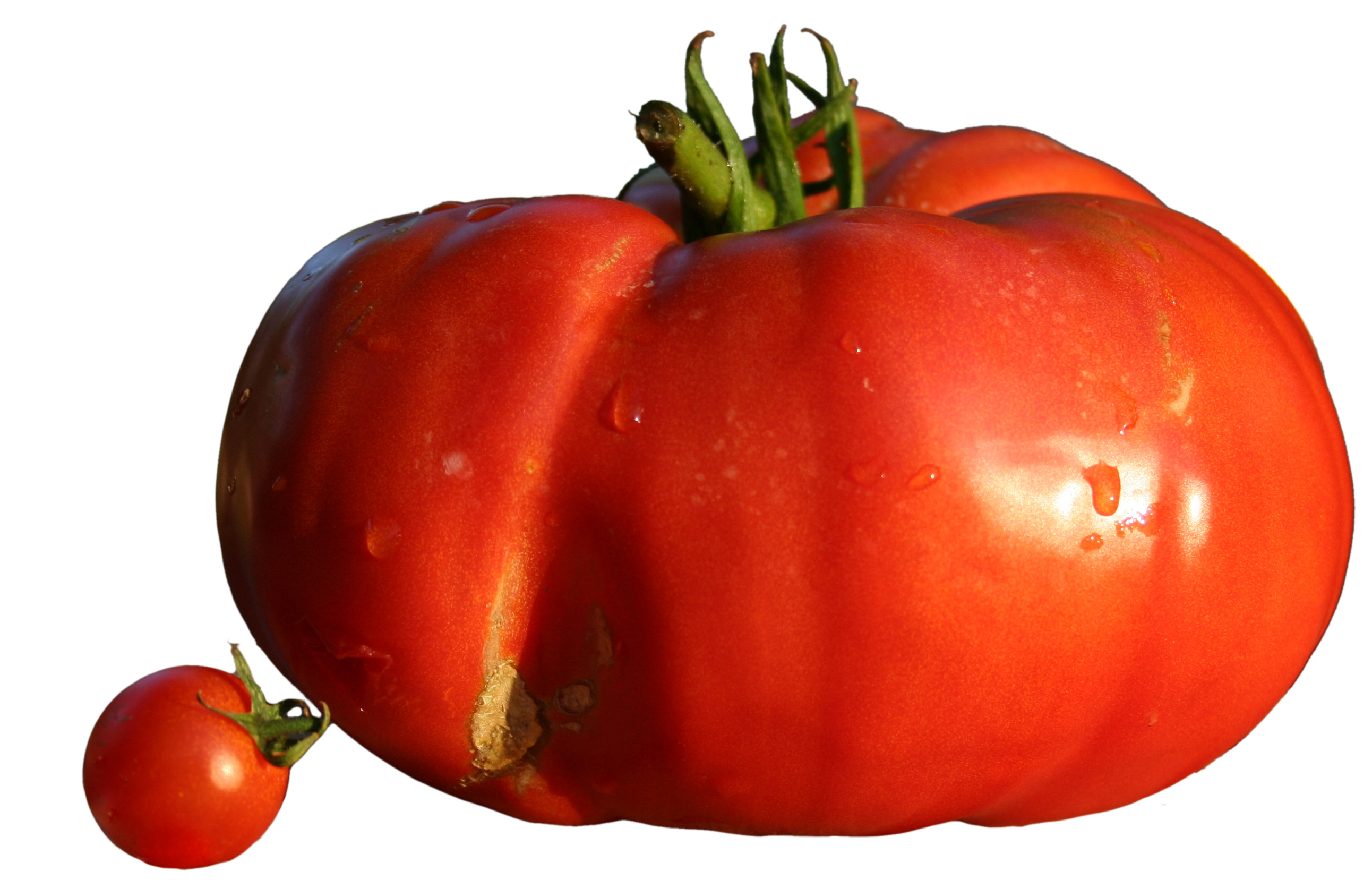
A cherry tomato (left) and a beefsteak tomato (right)

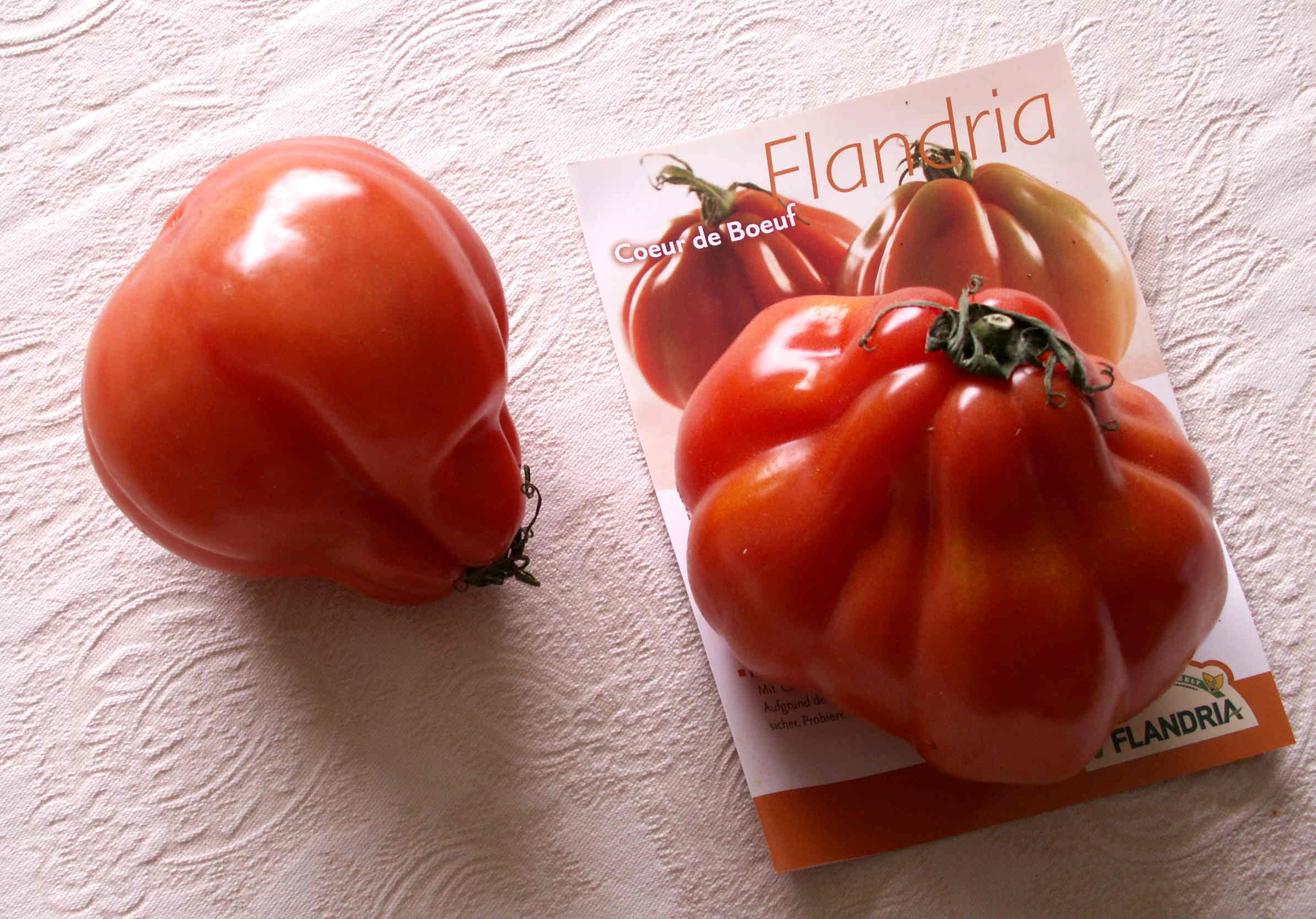
A coeur de boeuf-cultivar tomato

A beef tomato (British English) or beefsteak tomato (American English) is a large tomato. Grown on the plant Solanum lycopersicum, it is one of the largest varieties of cultivated tomatoes, regularly at 20 cm (7.9 in) in diameter with some weighing 450 g (1 lb) or more. Most are pink or red with numerous small seed compartments (locules) distributed throughout the fruit, sometimes displaying pronounced ribbing similar to ancient pre-Columbian tomato cultivars. While popular among home growers for beef sandwich toppings and other applications requiring a large tomato such as toppings on large steaks, beefsteaks are not grown commercially as often as other types, since they are not considered as suitable for mechanization as smaller slicing tomatoes. Non-commercially, however, they are the most popularly grown tomato in North America.

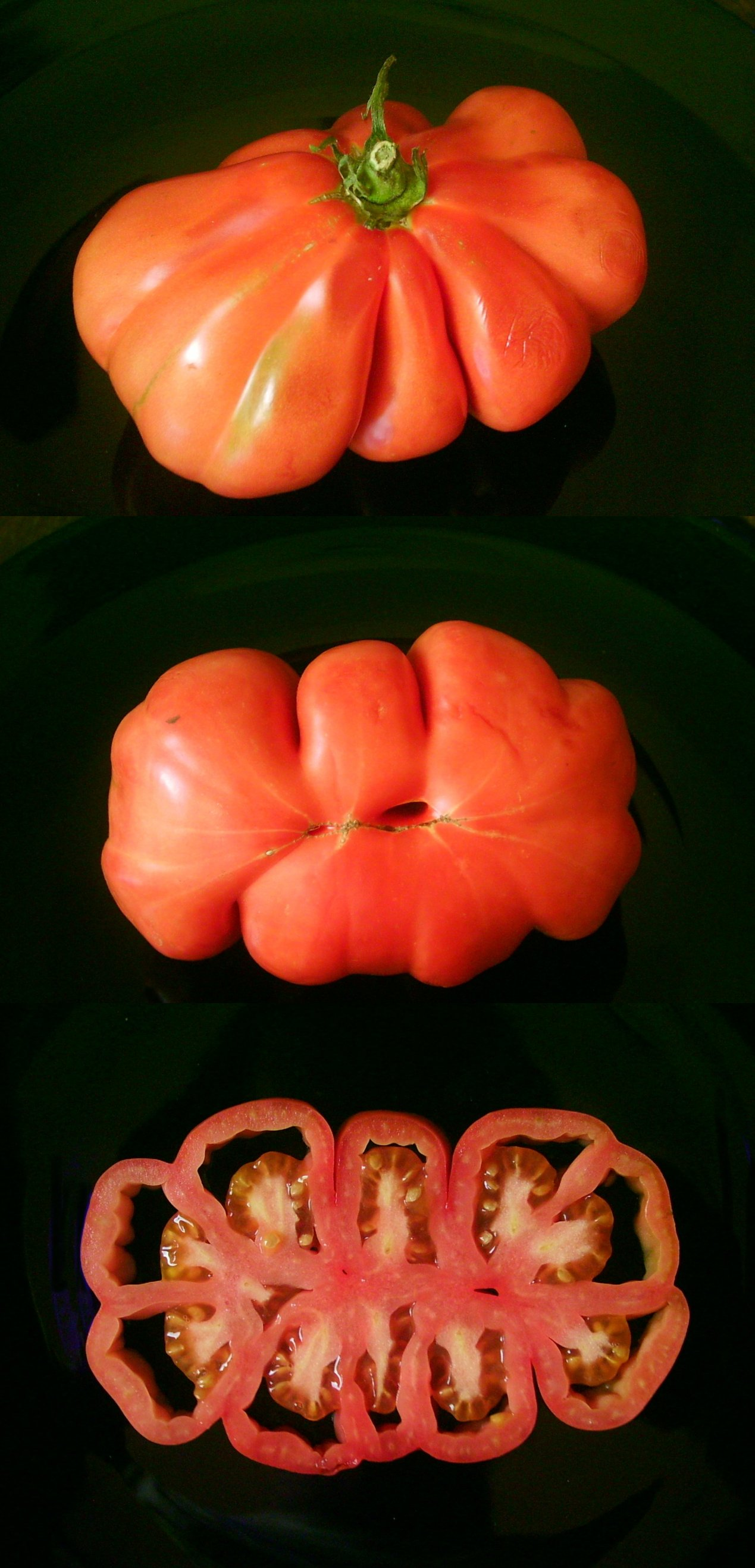
Beefsteak tomato top view, bottom view, and a slice

== Common varieties ==
- Beefmaster VFN, a popular hybrid beefsteak
- Beefsteak VFN
- Big Beef
- Brandywine, (a pink heirloom variety)
- Bucking Bronco
- Cherokee Purple, a dusky red/purple beefsteak, said to have exceptional flavour
- Marmande
- Mortgage Lifter, another popular heirloom variety
- Pink Beefsteak

== In Italy and France ==
Both in Italy and France, a variety of beefsteak tomato known as cuore di bue (Italian) or cœur de bœuf (French) is produced, so-named as it resembles an ox's heart pointing downwards.

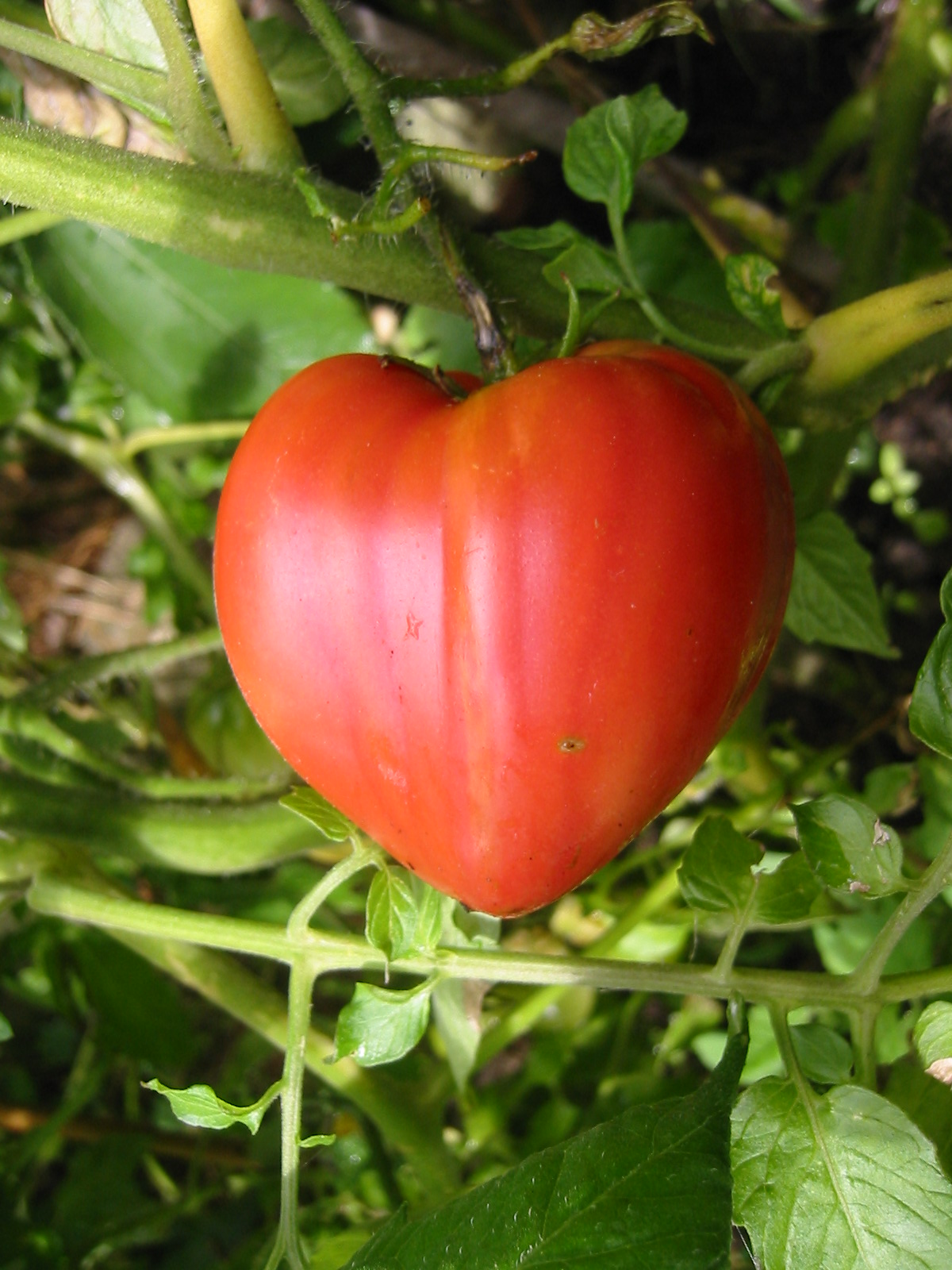
Cuor di boeuf tomato

In Italy, the cuore di bue has been given prodotto agroalimentare tradizionale certification, but no similar strict recognition has been granted in France. Despite a French rule that forbid to sold beefsteak tomato under the name cœur de bœuf (French)some companies continue naming other beefsteak tomatoes with different qualities cœur de bœuf.

== See also ==
- List of tomato cultivars
