= Potato leaf =

Type of leaves in tomato plants

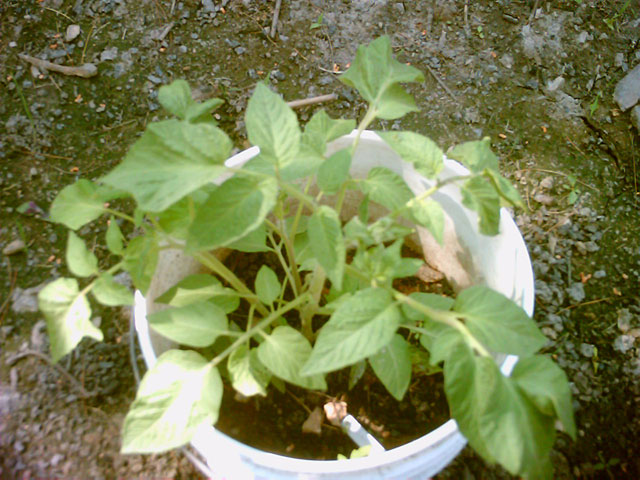
Image of a Brandywine tomato plant, showing the smooth potato-leaves

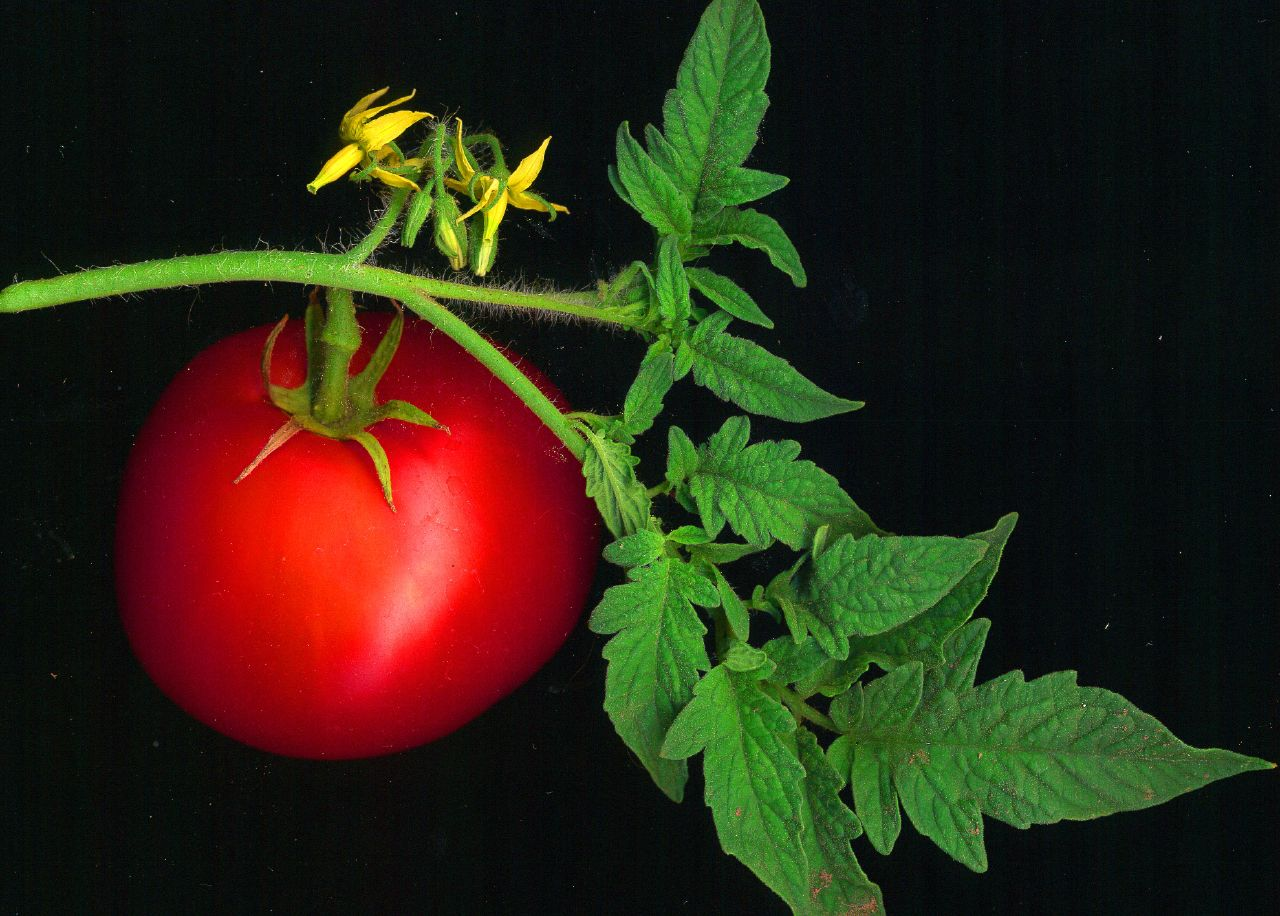
Normal tomato leaves, not potato-style.

Potato leaf (PL) is one of two major types of leaves which tomato plants exhibit. The other type is referred to as "regular leaf" (RL). Simply stated, potato leaf tomato plants have a smooth leaf edge when compared with the serrated edge of the regular leaf. The shape is oval and may feature notches separating large lobes. Its color is dark green.

Examples of potato leaf tomatoes include the Brandywine, Prudens Purple, Brandy Boy, Lillian's Yellow Heirloom, Stupice, Japanese Black Trifele, and others. The potato leaf trait is recessive.
