= Indeterminate growth =

In biology and botany, never-terminated growth

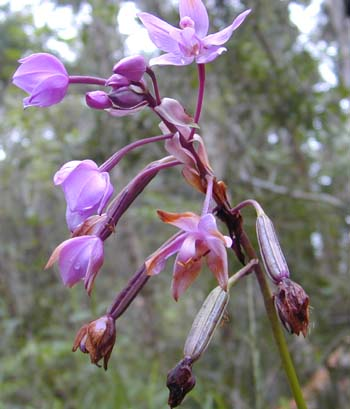
This inflorescence of the terrestrial orchid Spathoglottis plicata shows indeterminate growth; note that the opening of flowers and production of fruits is proceeding upwards on the shoot.

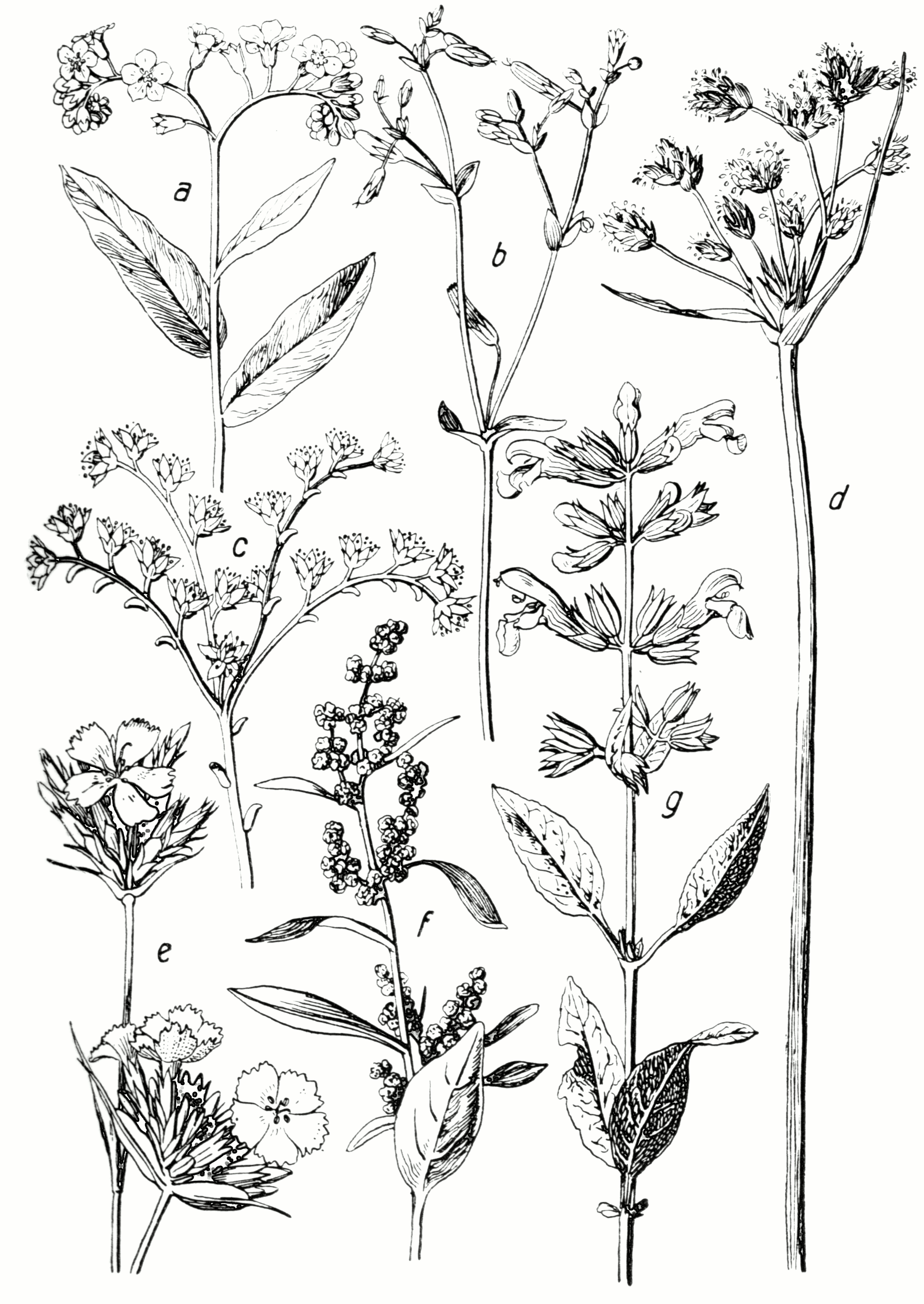
Cymose determinate inflorescences a. Myosotis b. Cerastium (dichasium) c. Sedum (scorpioid cyme) d. Scirpus lacustris (compound cyme) e. Dianthus (fascicle) f. Chenopodium album (sessile flowers in cymes) g. Salvia officinalis (cymule)

In biology and botany, indeterminate growth is growth that is not terminated, in contrast to determinate growth that stops once a genetically predetermined structure has completely formed. Thus, a plant that grows and produces flowers and fruit until killed by frost or some other external factor is called indeterminate. For example, the term is applied to tomato varieties that grow in a rather gangly fashion, producing fruit throughout the growing season. In contrast, a determinate tomato plant grows in a more bushy shape and is most productive for a single, larger harvest, then either tapers off with minimal new growth of fruit or dies.

== Inflorescences ==
In reference to an inflorescence (a shoot specialised for bearing flowers, and bearing no leaves other than bracts), an indeterminate type (such as a raceme) is one in which the first flowers to develop and open are from the buds at the base, followed progressively by buds nearer to the growing tip. The growth of the shoot is not impeded by the opening of the early flowers or development of fruits and its appearance is of growing, producing, and maturing flowers and fruit indefinitely. In practice the continued growth of the terminal end necessarily peters out sooner or later, though without producing any definite terminal flower, and in some species it may stop growing before any of the buds have opened.

Not all plants produce indeterminate inflorescences however; some produce a definite terminal flower that terminates the development of new buds towards the tip of that inflorescence. In most species that produce a determinate inflorescence in this way, all of the flower buds are formed before the first ones begin to open, and all open more or less at the same time. In some species with determinate inflorescences however, the terminal flower blooms first, which stops the elongation of the main axis, but side buds develop lower down. One type of example is Dianthus; another type is exemplified by Allium; and yet others, by Daucus.

== Animals ==
In zoology, indeterminate growth refers to the condition where animals grow rapidly when young, and continue to grow after reaching adulthood although at a slower pace. It is common in fish, amphibians, reptiles, and many molluscs. The term also refers to the pattern of hair growth sometimes seen in humans and a few domestic breeds, where hair continues to grow in length until it is cut.

== Mushrooms ==
Some mushrooms – notably Cantharellus californicus – also exhibit indeterminate growth.

== See also ==
- Determinate cultivar
