= Pomodoro =

Pomodoro (Italian for "tomato") may refer to:

- Arnaldo Pomodoro (1926–2025), Italian sculptor
- Giò Pomodoro (1930–2002), Italian sculptor, printmaker, and stage designer, brother of Arnaldo
- Pappa al pomodoro, an Italian soup dish
- Pasta al pomodoro, an Italian pasta dish
- Pasta Pomodoro (restaurant), American restaurant chain
- Passata di pomodoro, tomato purée
- The Pomodoro Technique, a time management method
