= Tomato soup =

Soup made with tomatoes

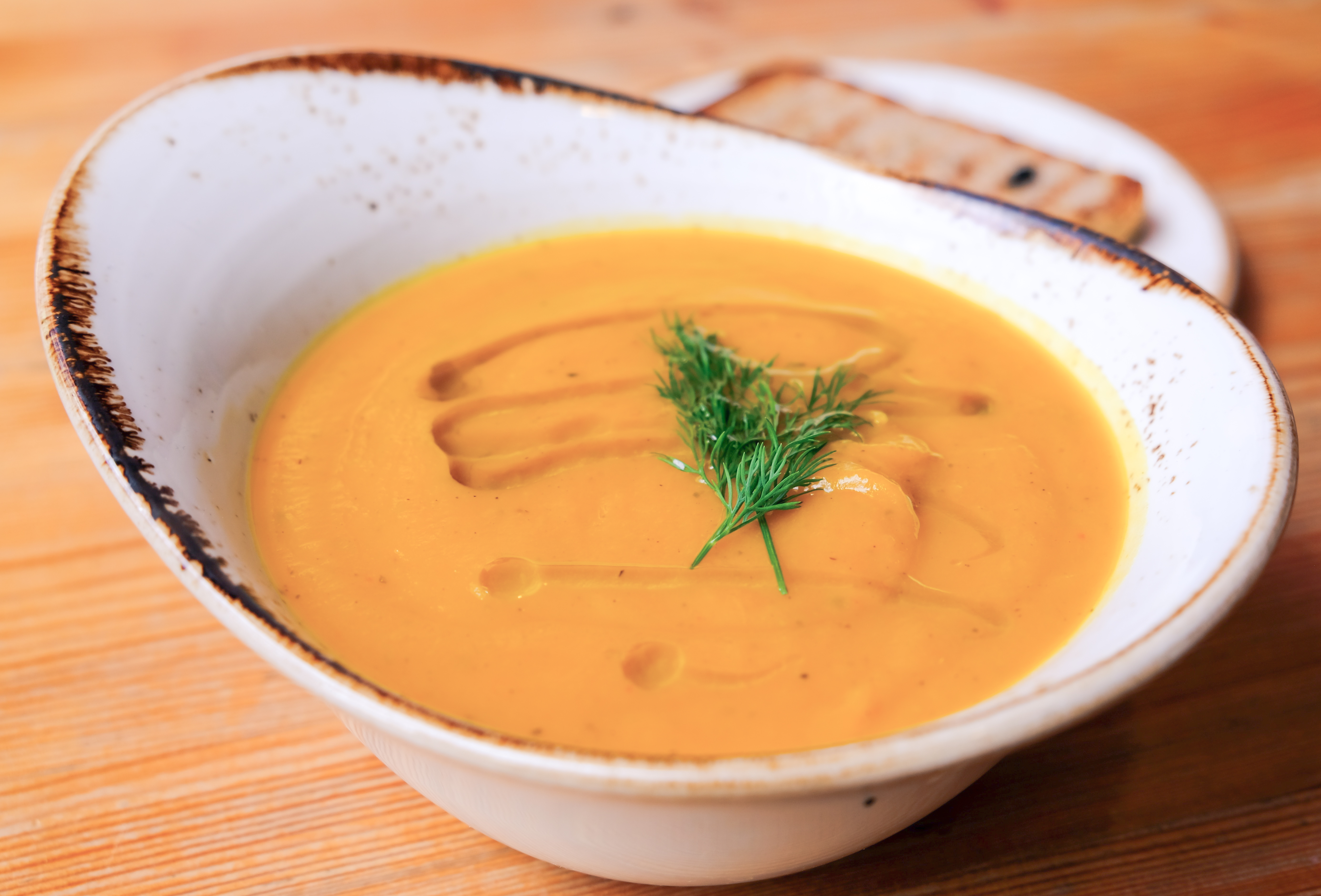
- Tomato soup
- Type: Soup
- Serving temperature: Hot or cold
- Main ingredients: Tomatoes
- Variations: Gazpacho
- Food energy (per 100 g serving): 30 kcal (130 kJ)
Nutritional value
(per 100 g serving)
- Protein: 0.8 g
- Fat: 0.3 g
- Carbohydrate: 7 g

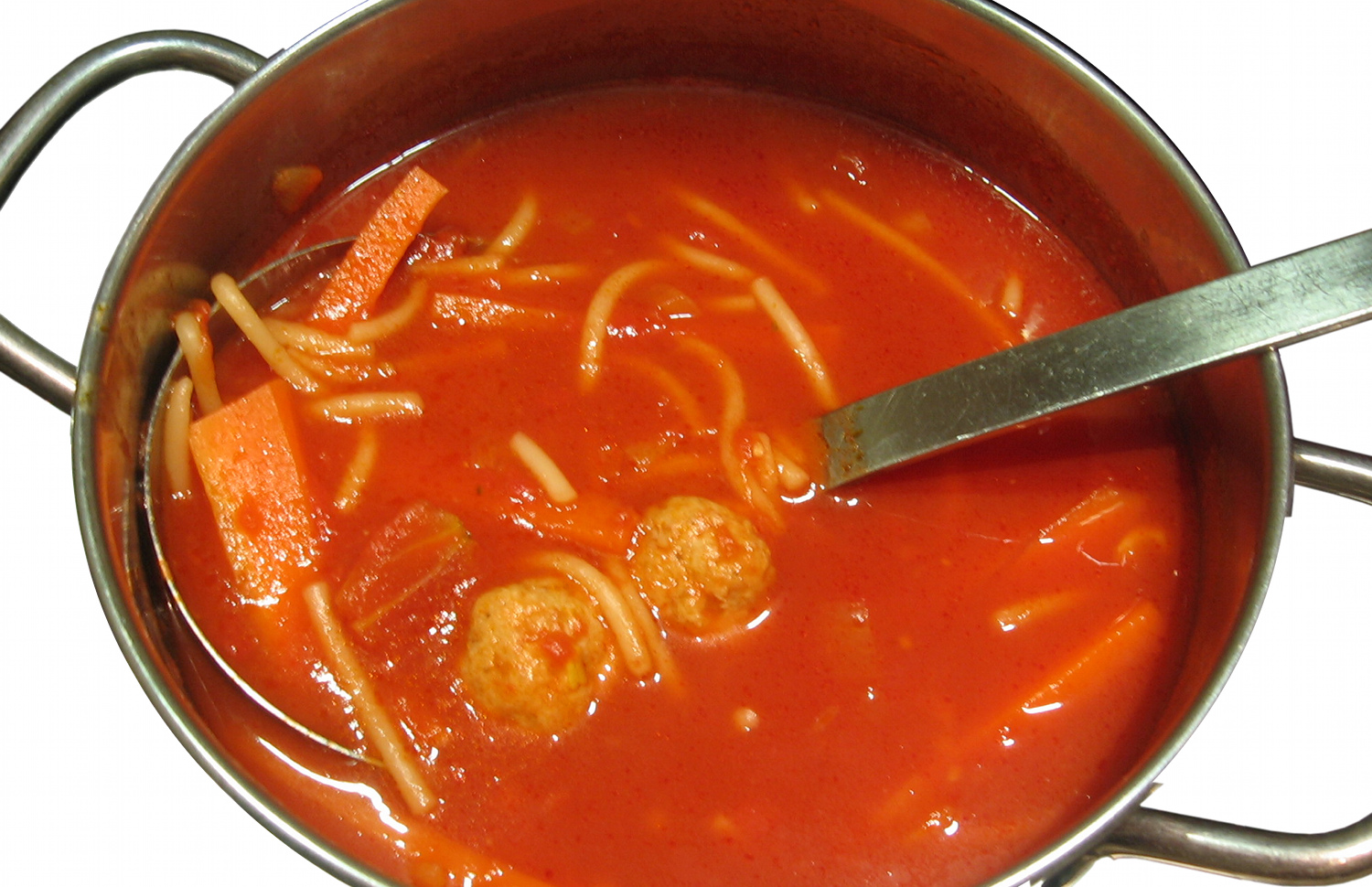
Tomato soup with meatballs, vermicelli and carrot slices

Tomato soup is a soup with tomatoes as the primary ingredient. It can be served hot or cold, and may be made in a variety of ways. It may be smooth in texture, and there are also recipes that include chunks of tomato, cream, chicken or vegetable stock, vermicelli, chunks of other vegetables and meatballs. Many countries have their own versions of tomato soup which all vary in taste, portions and ingredients.

== History ==
The first published recipe for tomato soup appeared in N. K. M. Lee's The Cook's Own Book in 1832. Eliza Leslie's tomato soup recipe featured in New Cookery Book in 1857 popularized the dish. The Campbell Soup Company later helped popularize the dish with the introduction of condensed tomato soup in 1897. In America, tomato soup was generally not consumed throughout the pre-civil war era due to a widespread belief that tomatoes were poisonous.

== Nutrition ==
Depending on the recipe, tomato soup is generally low in calories and high in potassium and vitamins C, K, and A. It is also rich in lycopene, a carotenoid pigment with many reputed health effects related to its antioxidant properties. The European Food Safety Authority concluded in 2011 that there was insufficient evidence for lycopene having antioxidant effects in humans, particularly in skin, heart function, or vision protection from ultraviolet light. The US Food and Drug Administration has similarly found that there is little scientific evidence that lycopene has an effect on specific forms of cancer, and prohibits manufacturers from making unqualified claims linking lycopene and cancer risk.

== Traditional tomato soup ==
A simple tomato soup can be prepared simply with ingredients such as canned tomatoes/tomatoes, onion, garlic, olive oil, vegetable broth or chicken broth and for the flavouring butter, salt and pepper or if required sugar can be used. It can also be made fresh by blanching tomatoes, removing the skins, then blending them into a puree. Fresh tomatoes are recommended to use only when they are very ripe, because the ripeness plays a crucial role in the depth of the flavour. In Poland, it is commonly prepared with tomato paste, chicken broth and sour cream. The soup is not "creamed" and contains pieces of vegetables such as carrots, parsley root, celery root, etc. It might be served with pasta or rice. The soup is often based on rosół that was cooked a few days earlier and has not been eaten. This way of cooking tomato soup and its popularity became an inside joke amongst Poles. In India, the soup is enhanced and usually spicy due to the availability of numerous spices. Indians usually substitute cumin, cardamom pods, ground cumin, grated ginger, turmeric, cayenne, coriander, garam masala, black pepper and topped with cilantro. The variation in the recipe differs from place to place.

== Gazpacho ==
Gazpacho is a tomato soup of Spanish origin, served cold. It originates in the region of Andalucía in southern Spain. Gazpacho is widely consumed in Spanish cuisine, as well as in neighbouring Portugal, where it is known as gaspacho. Gazpacho is mostly consumed during the summer months, due to its refreshing qualities and cold serving temperature. Many variations of gazpacho exist. The key difference between a traditional tomato soup and gazpacho is that gazpacho is never heated in the first place and is just a puree of raw vegetables. The other major difference is the main ingredient. Gazpacho is not just a tomato-rich soup, but contains numerous different vegetables in considerable quantities, such as cucumber and bell peppers.

In much of Andalusia and Extremadura where gazpacho is traditional, sopa de tomate, the literal translation of tomato soup, when not referring to modern industrial versions or foreign versions, refers to a particular local traditional hot soup that has stale bread as its main ingredient apart from tomato, usually with bell peppers, onion and garlic and often also poached eggs. This soup is cooked and eaten hot, and more bread is used than in gazpacho, so it absorbs much of the water and tomato juices. This soup is rather a hot bread soup with tomato, related to other bread-based Spanish hot soups, such as sopa de ajo, or to some versions of Southern Portuguese açorda, and somewhat similar to Italian pappa al pomodoro. So, in Spain, and especially in Andalusia where gazpacho is most traditional, gazpacho is considered something quite different from sopa de tomate (literally tomato soup).

== Tomato borscht ==
Some kinds of borscht are made with tomatoes since the nineteenth century; tomatoes are tart enough to resemble beet sour or hogweed sour, found in ancient types of borscht.

== Industrial tomato soup ==
Commercially prepared tomato soup is available in a variety of forms including preserved, condensed and in dehydrated powder form. Industrial tomato soup may be canned or come in a large drink carton or bag. "Tomato" ranks among the top three flavors of soup produced by the Campbell Soup Company.

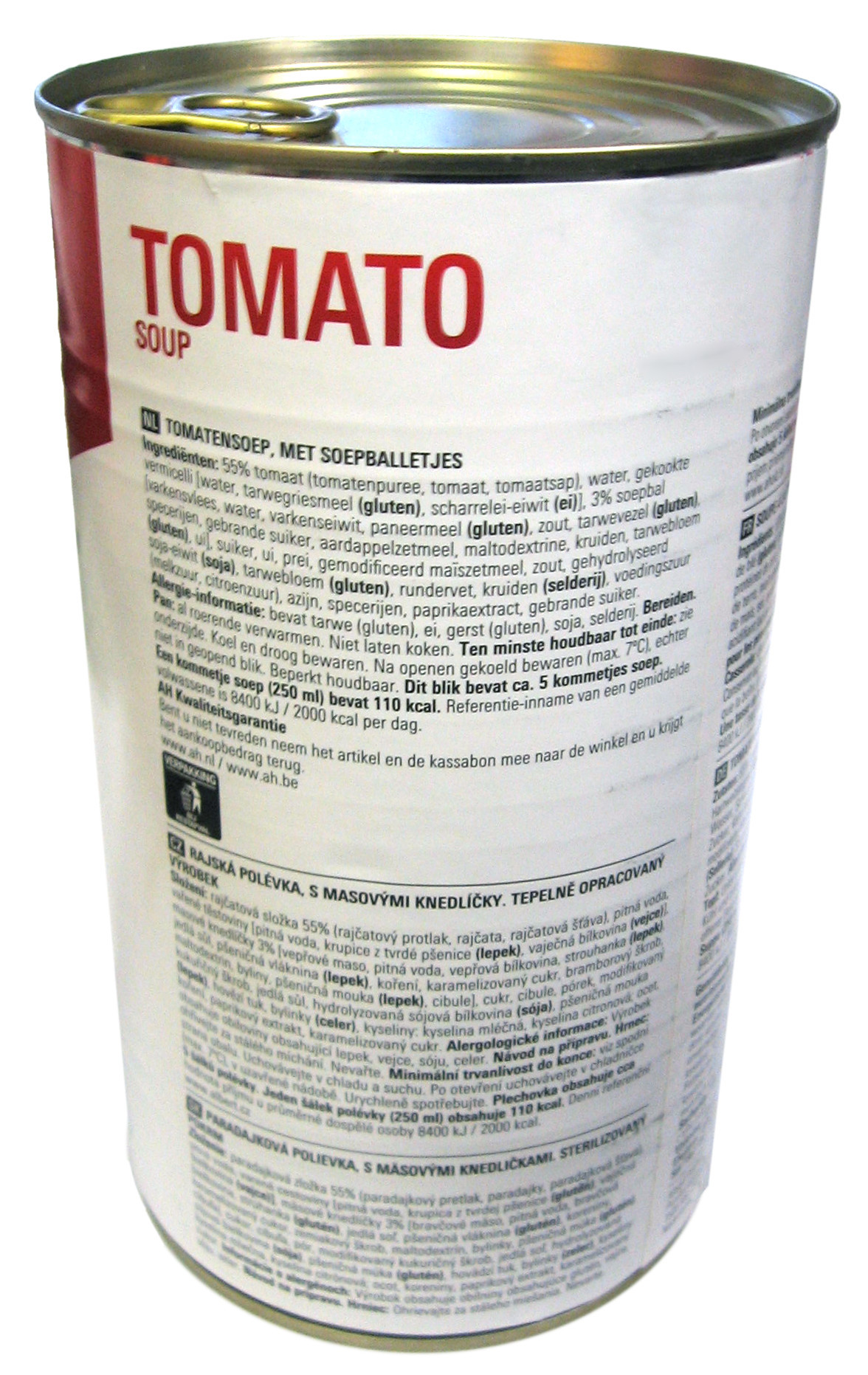
Industrial tomato soup

Industrial tomato soup is primarily tomato puree: that is, tomato paste and water with a few other ingredients added to enhance flavor and physical properties of the food.

The tomato is a high acid food therefore, "the tomato is not considered a high-risk food, as the pH of the fruit generally ranges from pH 4.2–4.9 with an average of about 4.5. At this point pathogens are unlikely to grow". However, there are still some food-borne pathogens that can pose as a major problem when it comes to the safety of the food and its shelf life stability. The main concern when canning is anaerobic microorganisms that produce toxins like Clostridium botulinum. Even though the tomato is a high acid food it still falls in the range where this organism can grow and produce toxin pH 4.6–8.5 with an optimum growing temperature between 30 and 40 °C and a maximum temperature of 50 °C. Even if the bacteria are killed they release heat-resistant spores that if they start to multiply become a threat.

The cell wall structural importance for the plant's growth and stability in the ripening process is equally important to the quality of the tomato products it can produce. The pectin and cellulose are what determine the apparent viscosity of the tomato product. If they are broken at higher temperatures more enzymes are deactivated than if they are broken at lower temperatures.

== See also ==
- List of cream soups
- List of soups
- List of tomato dishes
