= Tomato sandwich =

Tomato and mayonnaise sandwich

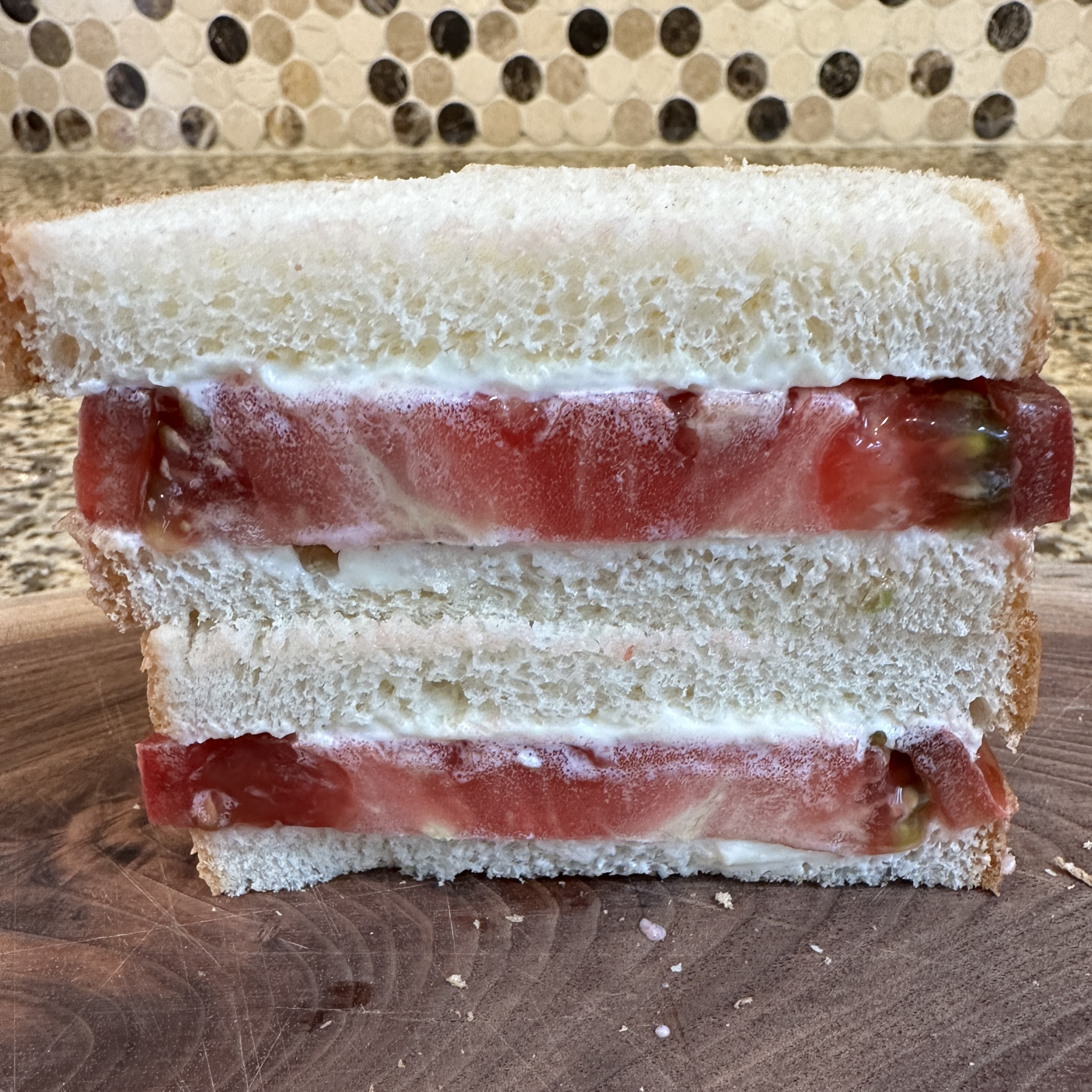
- Southern-style tomato sandwich
- Region or state: Southern United States
- Main ingredients: Tomato, sandwich bread, mayonnaise
- Ingredients generally used: salt, pepper

A tomato sandwich is a dish closely associated with the cuisine of the Southern United States. Recipes typically call for ripe-to-overripe non-commercially grown tomatoes, mayonnaise, salt, and pepper on soft commercial white bread. It is generally expected to be messy to eat.

== Cuisine and origins ==
According to Tasting Table, the Virginia Chronicle is widely credited with the first mention of the sandwich in 1911. According to Gwinnett Magazine, the Chronicle reported a man describing his lunch as "a tomato sandwich, a slice of watermelon, iced tea, and a slice of coconut cream pie".

The tomato sandwich is associated with Southern cuisine and according to Yahoo News is considered an important part of that cuisine. According to Chuck Reece, editor of Georgia Public Radio's Salvation South, the tomato sandwich is "one thing—one perfect thing—about which every Southerner can agree". The New York Times called it "the sandwich southerners wait for all year". Jenn Rice, writing in Garden & Gun, says "The taste of tomato slathered in mayo is such a part of our summer memories that it’s practically part of our DNA."

Outside of the South the tomato sandwich is not well-known and is sometimes mocked; Seattle food writer Geraldine DeRuiter caused a stir when she opined that "a 'tomato sandwich' is not a sandwich. You just don't have the ingredients to make a BLT". North Carolina YouTuber SouthernASMR posted a video of herself making and eating a tomato sandwich and was widely mocked by "plenty of ... non-southerners", some calling the sandwich "gross", according to the New York Times. Southern Living writer Rick Bragg said a common reaction from those outside the south when hearing of the sandwich was "yuck".

== Ingredients ==
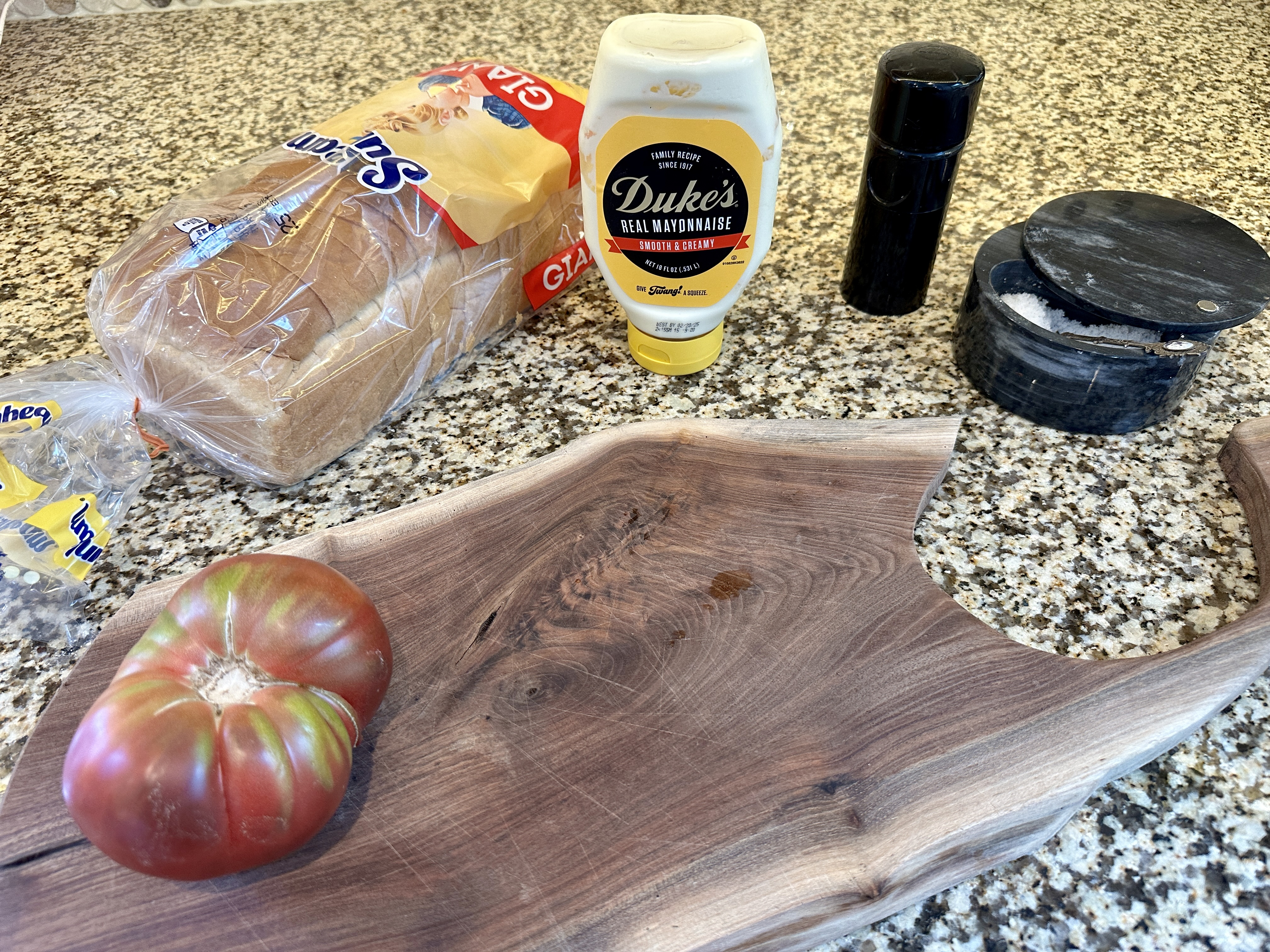
Ingredients of a tomato sandwich

The Southern-style sandwich is made with soft white bread, mayonnaise, salt, and pepper. According to Southern Living, this "basic formula ... produces a Southern ideal" and a "true taste of summer in the South". According to The Southern Belle Primer, "If you feel like being creative, you might add a pinch of garlic, or, if you’re very daring, even a little curry powder."

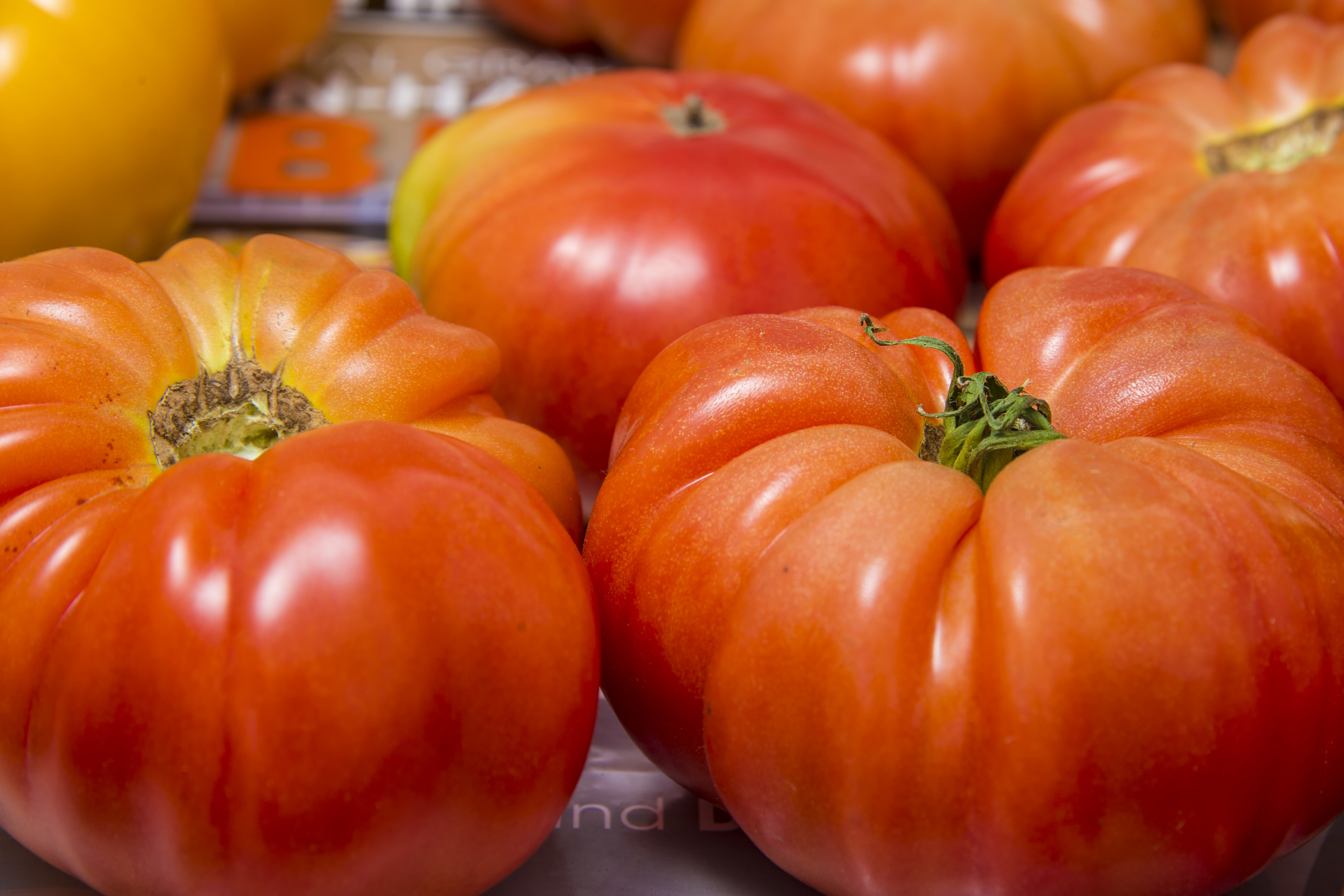
Heirloom tomatoes

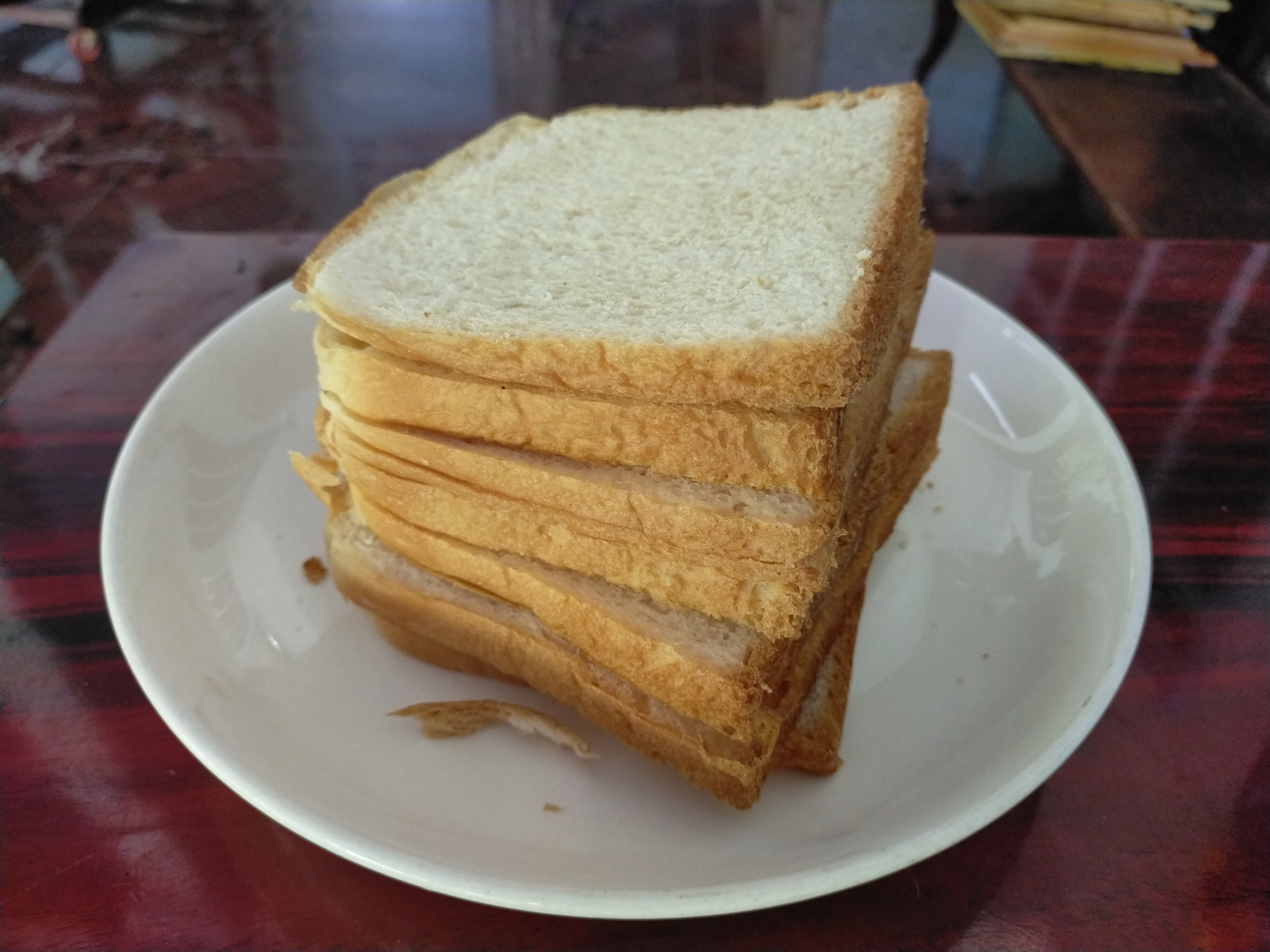
Sliced commercial white bread

The sandwich is ideally made with a fresh ripe-to-overripe tomato from a home garden or farmers' market; according to Southern Living, Serious Eats, and Bitter Southerner, a commercially grown supermarket tomato, which may have been picked unripe and stored refrigerated, "typically lacks the same level of juiciness, sweetness, and flavor complexity". Heirloom tomatoes such as Beefsteak are commonly recommended. A single slice of tomato the same size as the bread and at least as thick provides a sufficient filling while preventing thinner slices of tomato from slipping out of the sandwich.

The bread most commonly called-for is an untoasted soft commercial white sandwich bread such as Sunbeam, Sara Lee or Wonder Bread. Some recipes call for other soft white breads such as challah, brioche or Japanese milk bread, but Bill Smith, former chef at Crook's Corner, says "Use the cheapest store-brand white bread you can find ... Never, ever use any kind of fancy, artisanal loaf." Heirloom tomato expert John Coykendall, speaking to HuffPost, said "you have to have that old, cheap, white bread. The kind you wouldn’t ordinarily touch in your daily life. It’s the one thing that it was created for, tomato sandwiches". Some southern sandwich makers toast the bread, but more typically untoasted is specified. Mike Barnhardt of the Davie County Enterprise Record wrote "BLTs on toasted bread, yes; tomato sandwiches on toasted bread, no."

Friendly tongue-in-cheek arguments over the exact choices of mayonnaise or bread are common among southerners. According to Reece, among southerners who prefer Duke's or Blue Plate mayonnaise, the preference has been likened to "a battle". Some sandwich makers prefer Hellmann's, but Reece says, "Under no circumstances should you use Hellmann’s. It originated in New York City." Kewpie mayonnaise is sometimes specified.

A Georgia magazine instructed sandwich makers that "The Official Recipe" called for 'two slices of white bread ("Not toasted. Fresh, so it sticks to the back of your teeth"); a homegrown vine-ripe tomato ("Not peeled. Juicy so you have to hold it over the sink"); black pepper and salt; and "a sizable portion" of mayonnaise ("Not Miracle Whip")'. The Washington Post agreed there were rules: "Choose a very soft bread; now is not the time for artisanal multigrain crusty anything. Pick a tomato big enough to fill each sandwich with one thick (1/2-inch) slice. Use a Southern mayonnaise, such as Duke’s or Blue Plate. Season with just a little salt and pepper. Resist the urge to embellish – the idea is to focus on the taste of the tomato. And roll up your sleeves, with plenty of napkins at hand, or eat over the sink."

Because of the seasonal nature of home-grown and locally grown tomatoes, the sandwich is commonly associated with summer.

=== Variation ===
Variations from the classic combination commonly appear in media as tomato season approaches; such tomato sandwich recipes, which typically come from outside the south, may call for additional ingredients such as onion, basil, parsley, anchovies, cheese or other ingredients; for a whole-grain bread or artisan roll or biscuit, sometimes toasted; to be served open-faced; or for the use of sun-dried tomatoes or other flavoring ingredients in the mayonnaise.

Lisa Curran Matte of Tasting Table argues that "Some summer foods are so perfect in their simplest form, it would be bordering on travesty to even think about adding a touch of this or a pinch of that in the name of elevating a classic." Joe Yonan, writing in the Washington Post, says "Go ahead and add your cheese, your basil, your bacon, your ricotta, your avocado — all those are nice, but they are not a Southern tomato sandwich." Cookbook author Virginia Willis told the Washington Post, "I love artisan bread, but not when I want a tomato sandwich." Bettina Makalintal, writing for Vice Media, said additional ingredients "would make it a sandwich, but not a tomato one". Chef Jamie Simpson argues the classic version needs no embellishment, saying. "There are few things we choose not to take creative liberties with, [a]nd one of those is the tomato sandwich."

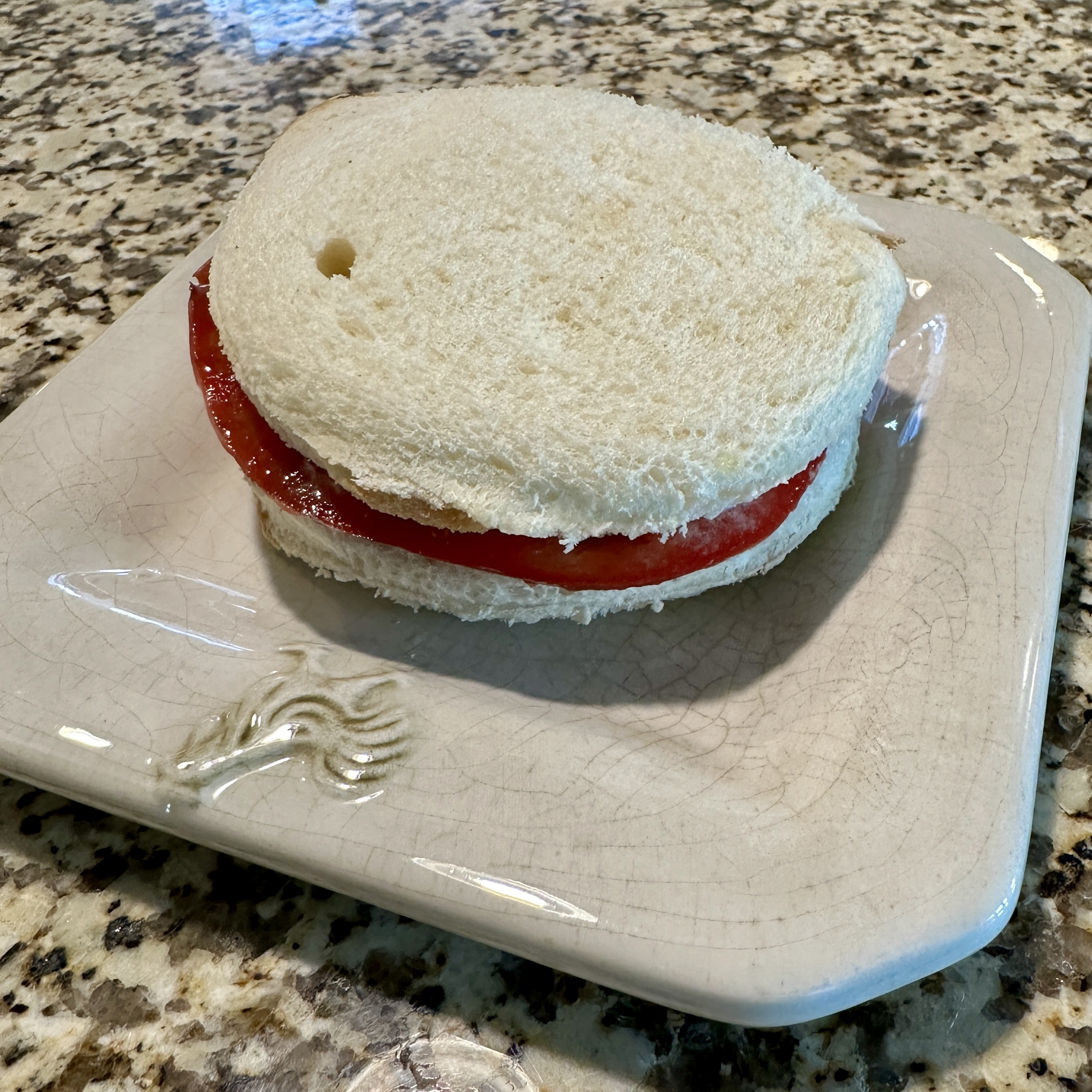
Vicksburg tomato sandwich

==== Vicksburg tomato sandwich ====
The Vicksburg tomato sandwich is a type of tea sandwich; it is prepared from the same ingredients as a tomato sandwich but the bread is cut into circles and the tomato is thinly sliced into rounds the same size as the bread and drained to avoid the messiness of a typical southern tomato sandwich. Such sandwiches are commonly served as hors d'oeuvres at cocktail parties and other entertainments. According to the 1991 A Southern Belle Primer, it is considered a necessary offering at such events.

== Preparation and serving ==
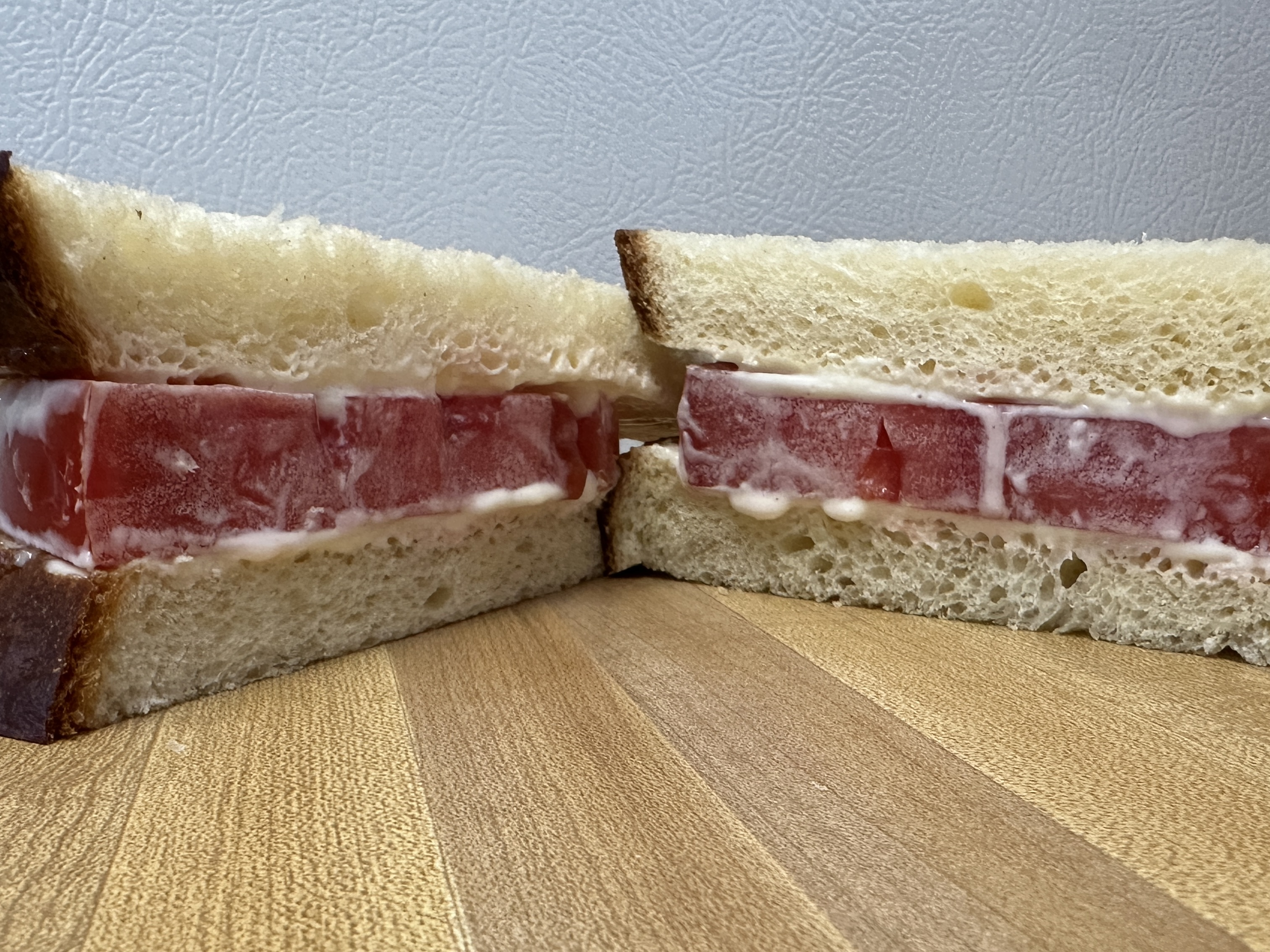
Tomato sandwich halves

Some recipes call for selecting tomatoes that are large enough to cover a slice of bread and slicing them at least as thickly as the bread is sliced to avoid slippage of more thinly sliced or smaller tomatoes. The sandwich is assembled and, according to some recipes, allowed to sit for several minutes to allow the salt to release some of the juices into the mayonnaise and bread; others call for serving immediately to avoid the risk of sogginess. Enthusiasts often recommend eating the sandwich over the kitchen sink due to its messiness and even call out that level of messiness as the hallmark of an excellent tomato sandwich. Ernest Matthew Mickler's White Trash Cooking even names the recipe 'Kitchen Sink Tomato Sandwich'.

== Events ==
Alabama has held an annual Tomato Sandwich Lunch since the early 2000s. The University of North Georgia has awarded scholarships at an annual Tomato Sandwich Supper since the late 2010s.

== See also ==
- List of sandwiches
- List of tomato dishes
