= Sun-dried tomato =

Tomatoes which have been dried in the sun

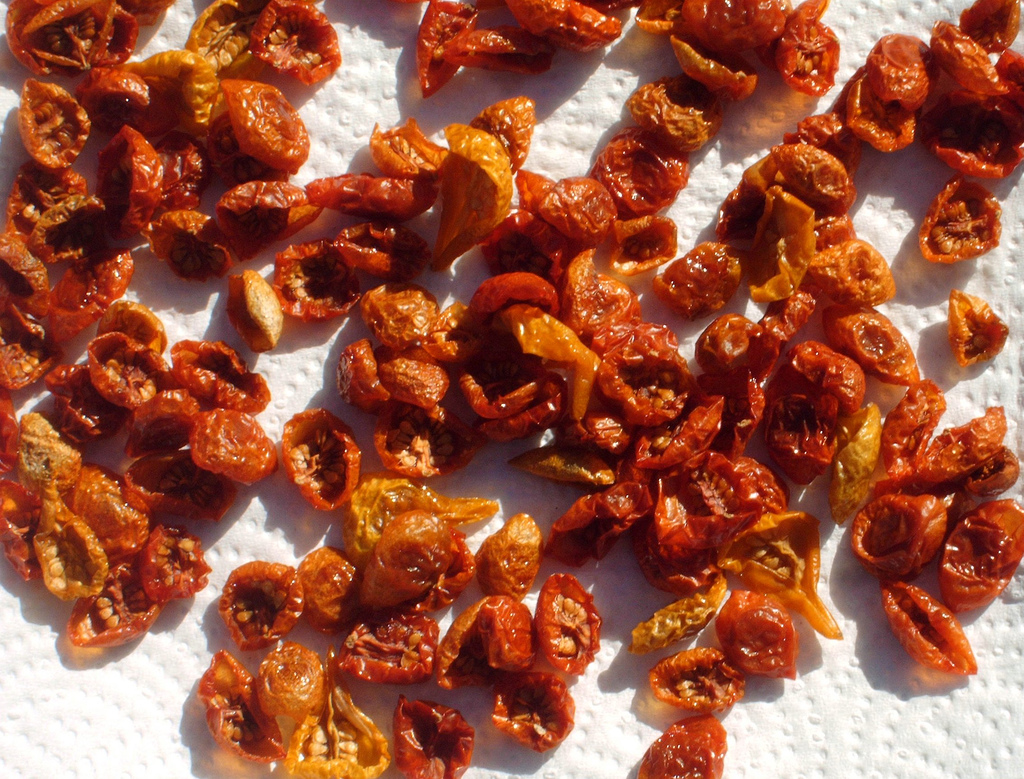
Sun-dried tomatoes

Sun-dried tomatoes are ripe tomatoes that lose most of their water content after spending a majority of their drying time in the sun. These tomatoes are usually pre-treated with sulfur dioxide or salt before being placed in the sun in order to improve color and appearance. Typically, tomatoes spend 4–11 days in the sun in order for the sun-drying process to be complete. Cherry tomatoes will lose 88% of their initial (fresh) weight, while larger tomatoes can lose up to 98% during the process. As a result, it takes anywhere from 8 to 14 kilograms of fresh tomatoes to make a single kilogram of sun-dried tomatoes.

After the procedure, the tomato fruits will keep their nutritional value. The tomatoes are high in lycopene, antioxidants, and vitamin C. The final products may contain up to 2–6% of salt and could provide a significant contribution to the day's intake. Sun-dried tomatoes can be used in a wide variety of recipes and come in a variety of shapes, colors, and types of tomato. Traditionally, they were made from dried red plum tomatoes, but they can be purchased in yellow varieties. Sun-dried tomatoes are also available in the form of pastes or purées.

Sun-dried tomatoes are often preserved in sunflower or olive oil, sometimes along with other ingredients such as capers and garlic or with a variety of herbs.

== History ==
Tomatoes were originally salted and dried to preserve the fruit. Salting and evaporating the moisture from foodstuffs significantly delays the process of decomposition. By drying ripe tomatoes, these foods could be enjoyed and provide valuable nutrition in the winter when it is difficult or impossible to grow fresh produce. The true origin of sun-dried tomatoes is unclear. Italians originally dried their tomatoes on their ceramic roof-tops in the summer sun. Sun-dried tomatoes surged in popularity in the United States in the late 1980s to early 1990s, where they were often found in antipasto, tapas, pasta dishes and salads, becoming a trend before losing popularity from overuse by the end of the 1990s.

== See also ==
- List of tomato dishes
