= Tomato jam =

Fruit jam

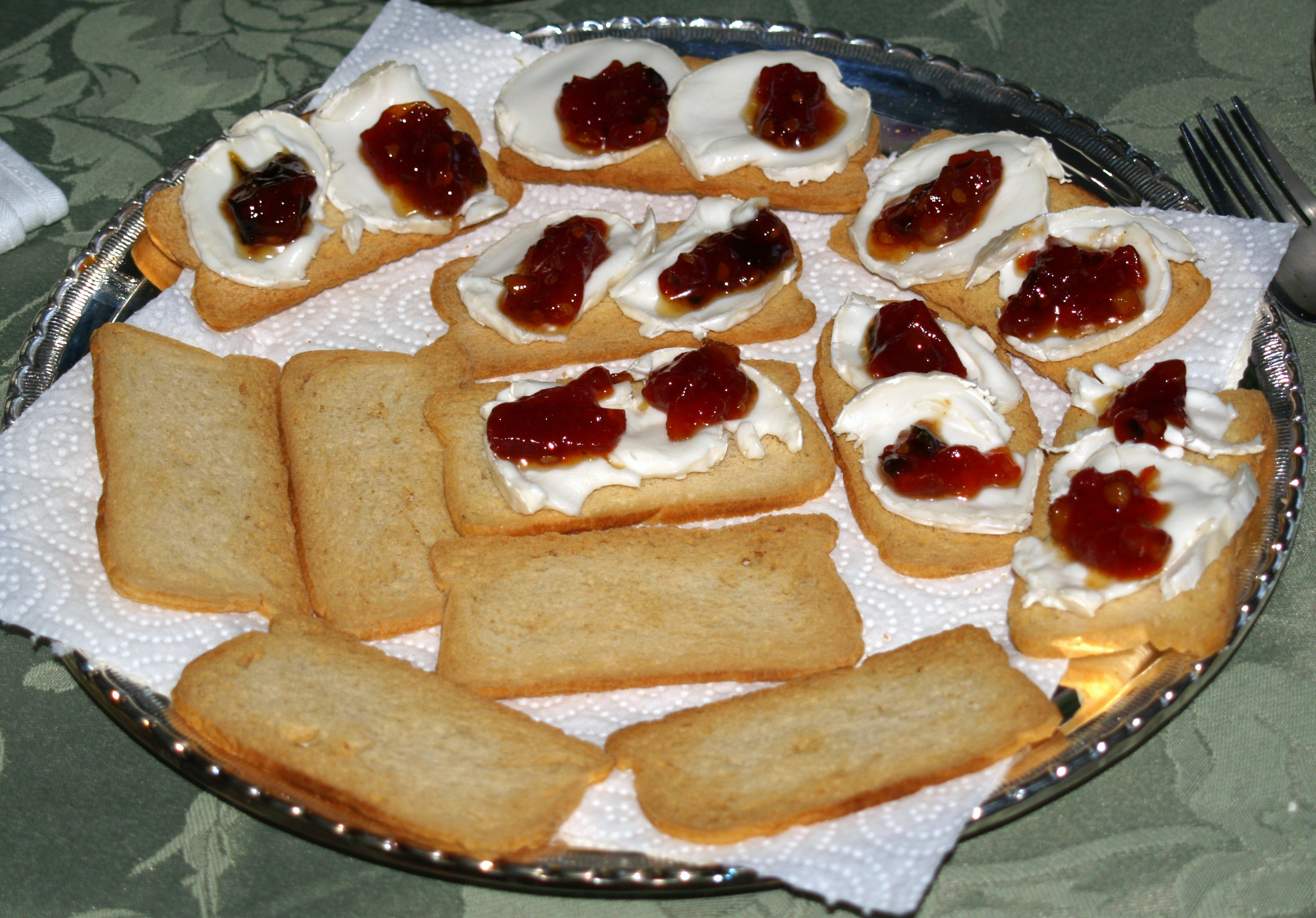
- Melba toast topped with goat cheese and tomato jam
- Alternative names: Tomato jelly
- Type: Fruit preserves
- Main ingredients: Tomatoes; Sugar

Tomato jam (or tomato jelly, jamato) is a type of fruit preserve prepared with tomatoes and sugar.

== Overview ==
Green tomatoes are used in some preparations. Some preparations may use honey, and some include bacon. It has been described as "a cross between marmalade and ketchup". Some commercially prepared varieties are produced. It is sometimes used in the preparation of sandwiches similar to a BLT, using the jam in place of tomato.

Tomato jam has been described as a popular condiment in South Africa.

== History ==
In 1840 in the United States, a recipe was published in the American Farmer that involved straining stewed tomatoes through cloth, adding an equal amount of sugar, and then boiling the mixture for a few hours.

In 1843 in the U.S., a recipe for preparing tomato jam was published in the Boston Cultivator. The preparation process included rubbing stewed tomatoes through a sieve, adding an equal amount of sugar, and then stewing the mixture into a jam.

== See also ==
- Fruit ketchup
- List of spreads
- List of tomato dishes
- Tomato chutney
