= Canned tomato =

Processed tomatoes sealed in a can

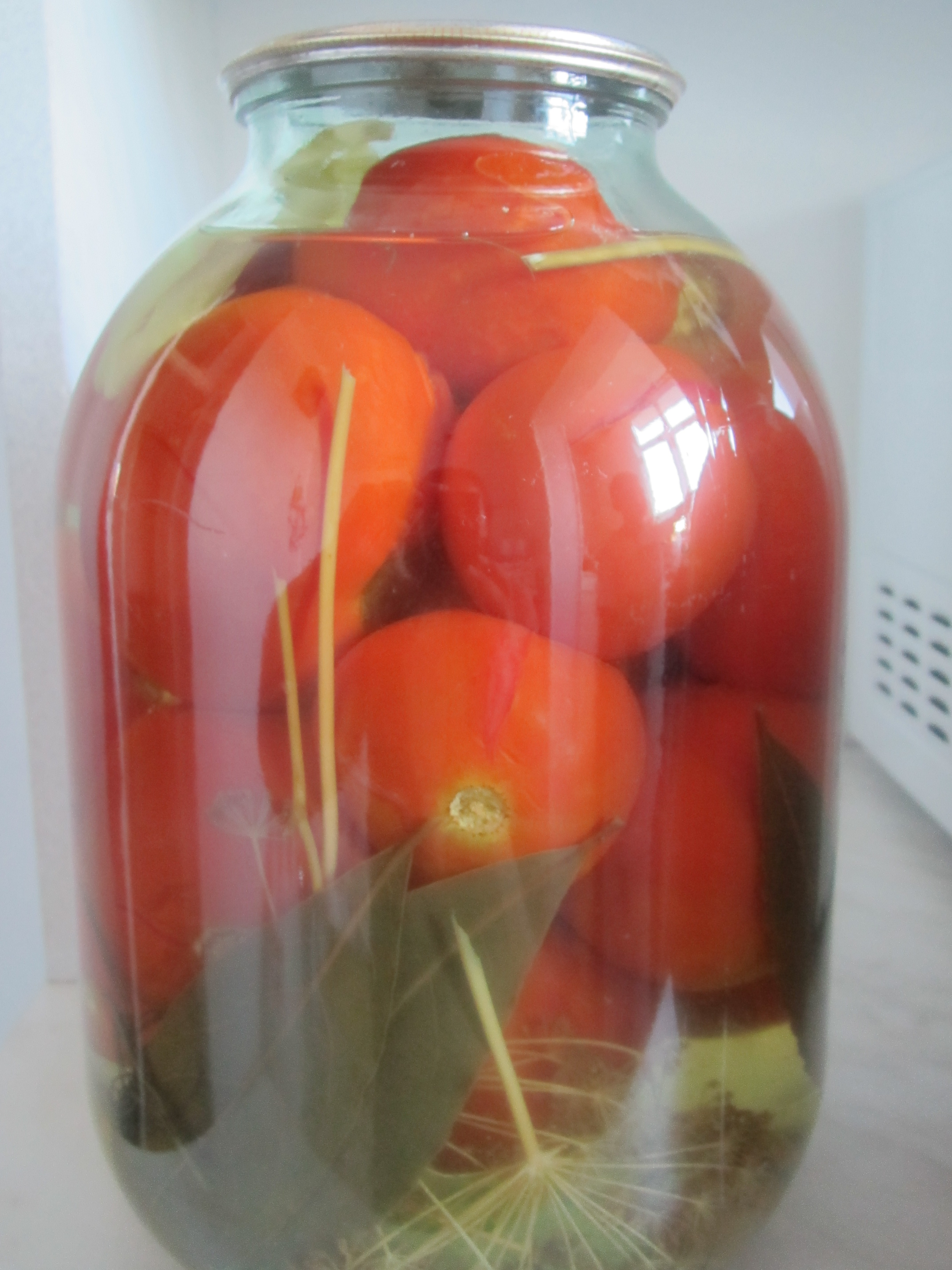
Homemade canned tomatoes are a convenience food across the former Soviet Union.

Canned tomatoes, or tinned tomatoes, are tomatoes, usually peeled, that are sealed into a can after having been processed by heat. Industrially produced canned tomatoes are a staple food worldwide, and subject to regular market analysis as well as trade considerations.

Canned tomatoes may be produced either peeled whole, diced, or crushed. Some manufacturers include calcium chloride as a food stabilizer, to retain the shape of the whole or diced tomato; this can be preferred by cooks for recipes where discrete tomato chunks are desirable, such as chili con carne. Crushed tomatoes, tomato purée, tomato sauce and tomato paste typically do not contain calcium chloride, given their more liquid structure.

== Home canning ==
Home canned tomatoes may be prepared in a number of ways. However, safety measures need to be taken, since improperly canned tomatoes can cause botulism poisoning, whether produced industrially or at home.

== See also ==
- List of tomato dishes
