= Tomato bredie =

South African stew

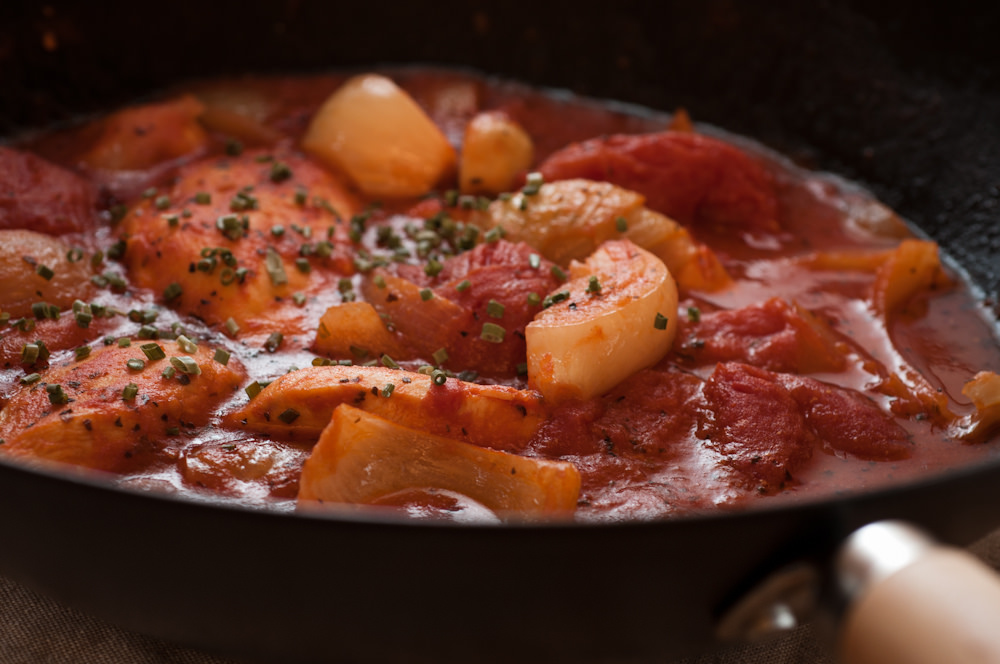
- Type: Stew
- Place of origin: South Africa
- Main ingredients: Mutton, cinnamon, cardamom, ginger, cloves, chilli

Tomato bredie is a South African stew, referred to in Afrikaans as 'tamatiebredie', normally made with mutton. It is cooked for a very long time, and its seasonings include cinnamon, cardamom, ginger and cloves as well as chilli.

"Bredie" is the Afrikaans word for "stew", but is actually a word of Malaysian origin. This form of cooking was introduced to the Cape by Malays, who were brought to the colony in most cases as slaves. The word bredie refers to oriental spinach. In tomato bredie, tomato is used instead. Pumpkin, green beans and waterblommetjies (Cape water lily, Aponogeton distachyos, flowers) are also used. This traditional South African dish is commonly eaten around South Africa by both locals and tourists.

Bredies generally are a spiced stew of mutton ribs, generally cooked with vegetables. In addition to tomato they can also feature cauliflower, lentils, parsnips, and quince, and are served with rice.

== See also ==
- List of lamb dishes
- List of tomato dishes
- List of African dishes
- List of stews
