= Geraldine DeRuiter =

American author and blogger

Geraldine DeRuiter is an American author and blogger who runs the Everywhereist blog.

== Career ==
Her memoir, All Over the Place, was published in 2017. In 2022 she caused a stir when she opined on Twitter that "a 'tomato sandwich' is not a sandwich. You just don't have the ingredients to make a BLT".

Her 2024 memoir If You Can't Take the Heat: Tales of Food, Feminism, and Fury was published to positive reviews, being featured in the March 2024 issue of BookPage magazine. EATER listed the book as one of their best food books to read in Spring 2024.

== Recognition ==
Time magazine named Everywhereist one of their blogs of 2011.

In 2019 DeRuiter won the James Beard Foundation Award, in the category of Personal Essay Long Form, for her post on Everywhereist titled "I Made the Pizza Cinnamon Rolls From Mario Batali's Sexual Misconduct Apology Letter."

== Personal life ==
DeRuiter lives in Seattle. She is married to Rand Fishkin, cofounder of marketing platforms Moz and Sparktoro.

== Bibliography ==
- DeRuiter, G. (2017). All Over the Place: Adventures in Travel, True Love, and Petty Theft. PublicAffairs. ISBN 978-1-61039-764-3.
- DeRuiter, G. (2024). If You Can't Take the Heat: Tales of Food, Feminism, and Fury. Crown. ISBN 978-0-593-44448-1.
