= List of tomato dishes =

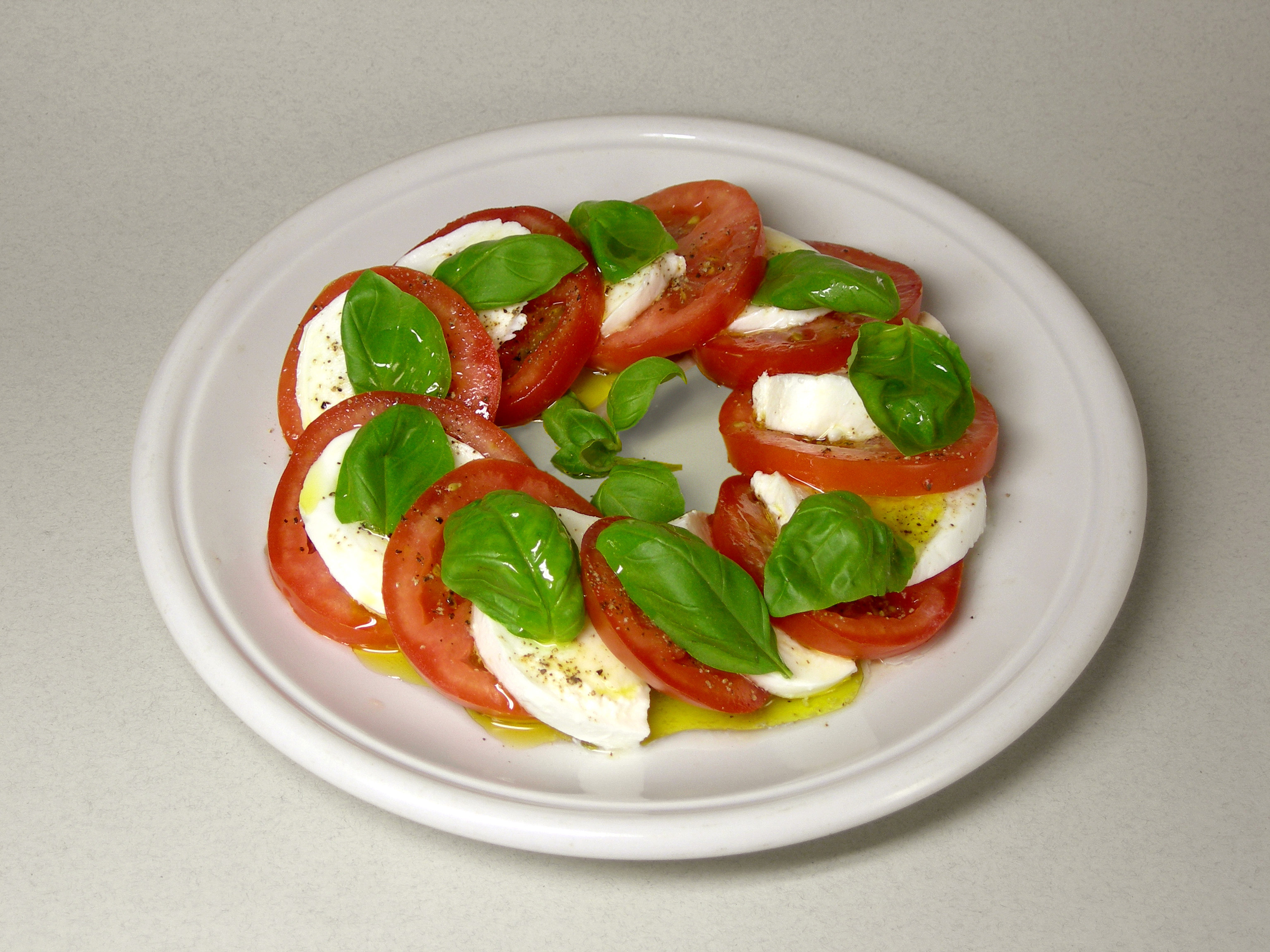
Caprese salad

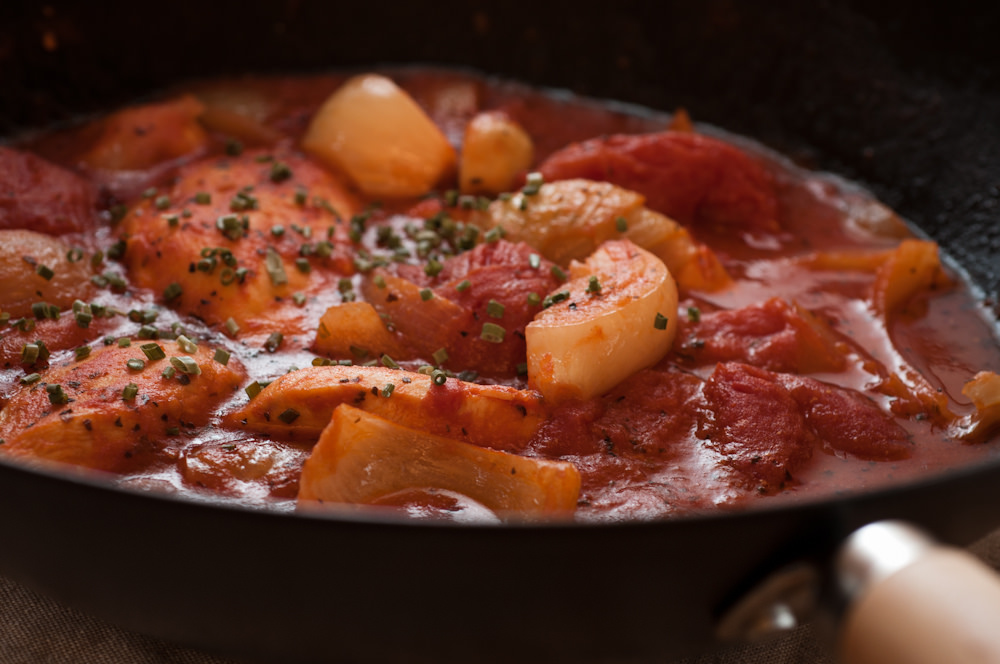
Tomato bredie prepared with chicken

This list includes dishes in which the main ingredient or one of the essential ingredients is tomato. Dishes prepared with tomato sauces as a primary ingredient are not included in this list.

== Tomato dishes ==
- Bruschetta – Italian appetizer
- Caprese salad – Italian salad
- Fried green tomatoes – American dish
- Galayet bandora – Levantine tomato, onion, and hot pepper dish
- Gazpacho – Spanish cold soup dish
  - Porra antequerana – Andalusian soup
- Ketchup – Sauce used as a condiment
- Kinamatisang manok – Filipino chicken and tomato stew
- Paprykarz szczeciński – Polish canned fish spread
- Pa amb tomàquet – Traditional food of Catalonia
- Panzanella – Italian bread salad
- Pappa al pomodoro – Italian soup
- Pasta al pomodoro – Italian pasta dish
- Pico de gallo – Mexican condiment
- Pizza pugliese – Oven-baked Italian leavened flatbread
- Salmorejo – Traditional soup from Andalusia, Spain
- Sarsiado – Filipino fish dish with tomatoes and eggs
- Shakshouka – Maghrebi dish of eggs poached in a sauce
- Stewed tomatoes
- Stir-fried tomato and scrambled eggs – Common Chinese dish
- Stuffed tomatoes – Tomato dish
- Tomato and egg soup – Chinese soup dish
- Tomato bredie – South African stew
- Tomato chutney – Chutney with tomatoes as the main ingredient
- Tomato compote – Side dish made from cooked tomatoes
- Tomato jam – Fruit jam
- Tomato juice – Beverage made from tomatoes
- Tomato omelette – Indian breakfast dish prepared mostly in Maharashtra
- Tomato paste – Paste made from tomatoes
- Tomato pie may refer to:
  - Green tomato pie – Sweet pie made with green tomatoes
  - Italian tomato pie – Pizza-like baked good of Italian-American origin
  - New Haven-style pizza – Regional Pizza Style from New Haven, Connecticut
  - Trenton tomato pie – Type of Italian tomato pie
  - Sicilian pizza – Style of thick-crusted pizza
  - Southern tomato pie – Pie from the Southern United States
- Tomato purée – Food
- Tomato sandwich – Tomato and mayonnaise sandwich
  - BLT sandwich – Bacon, lettuce, and tomato sandwich
  - Cheese and tomato sandwich – Tomato and mayonnaise sandwich
- Tomato sauce – Sauce made primarily from tomatoes
- Tomato soup – Soup made with tomatoes
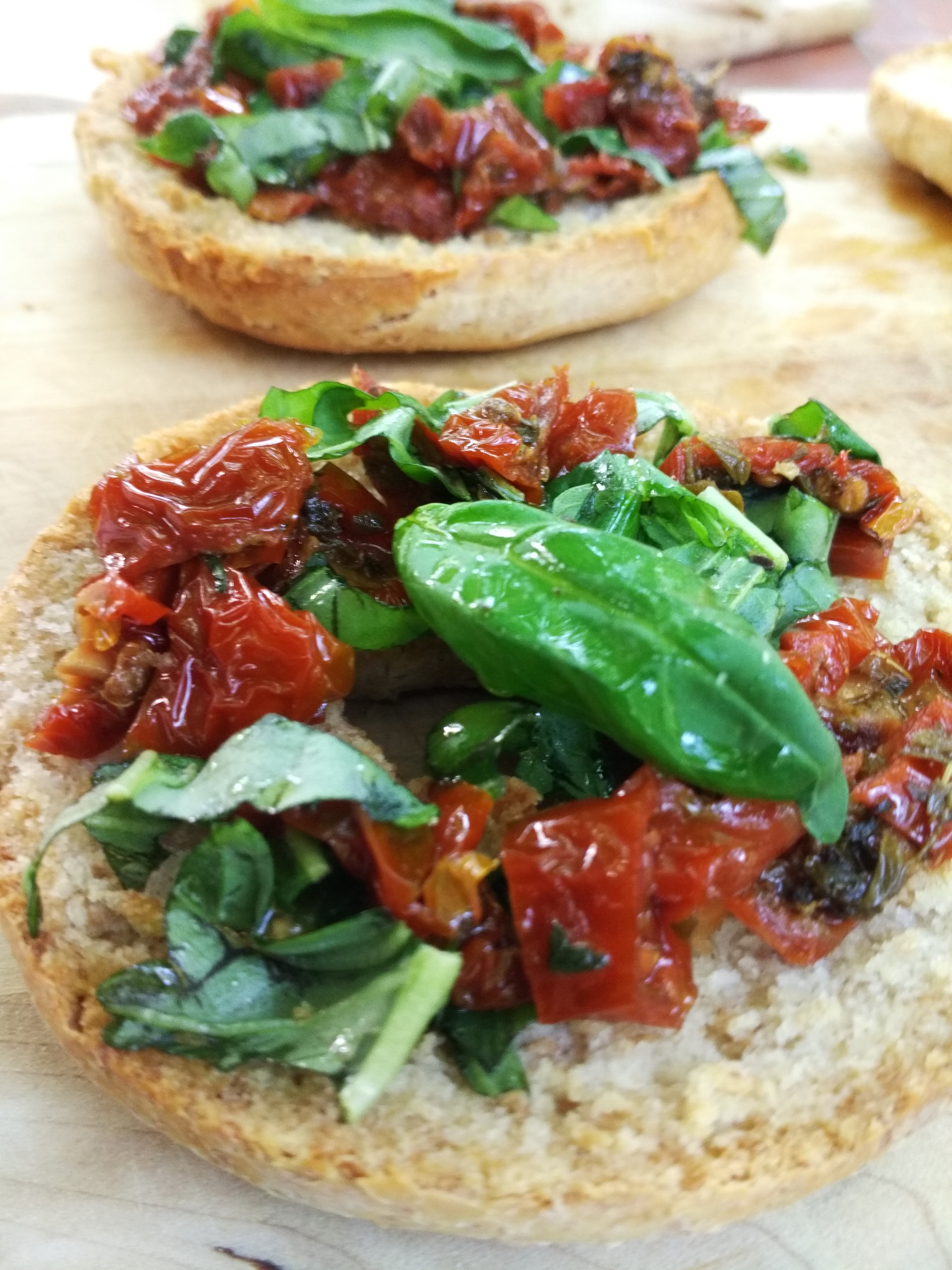
Bruschetta

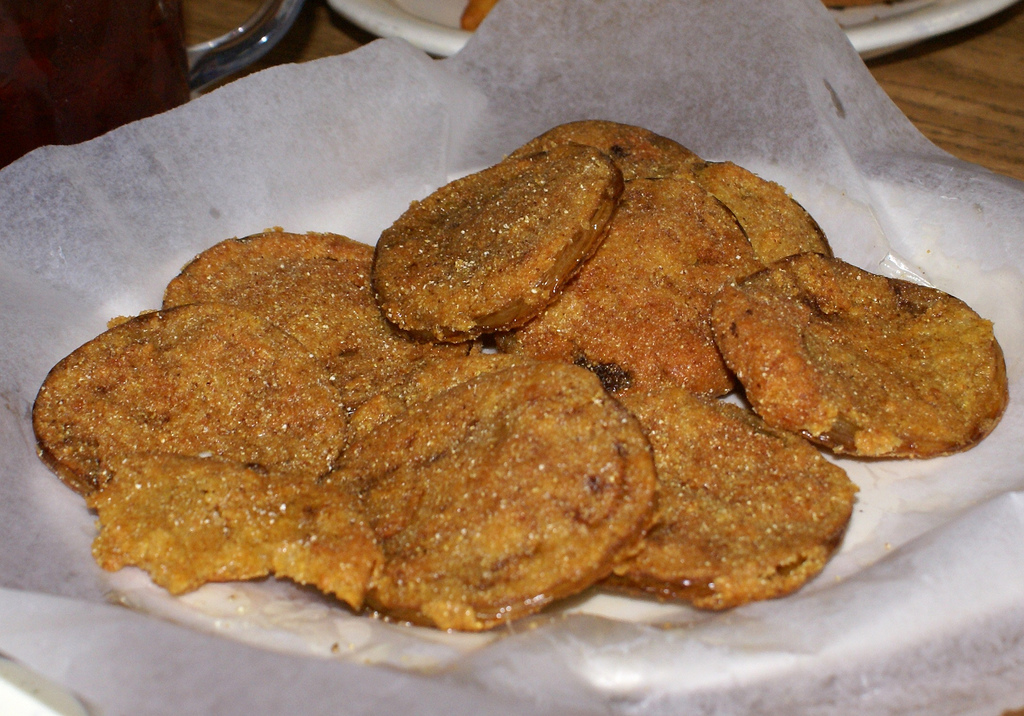
Fried green tomatoes

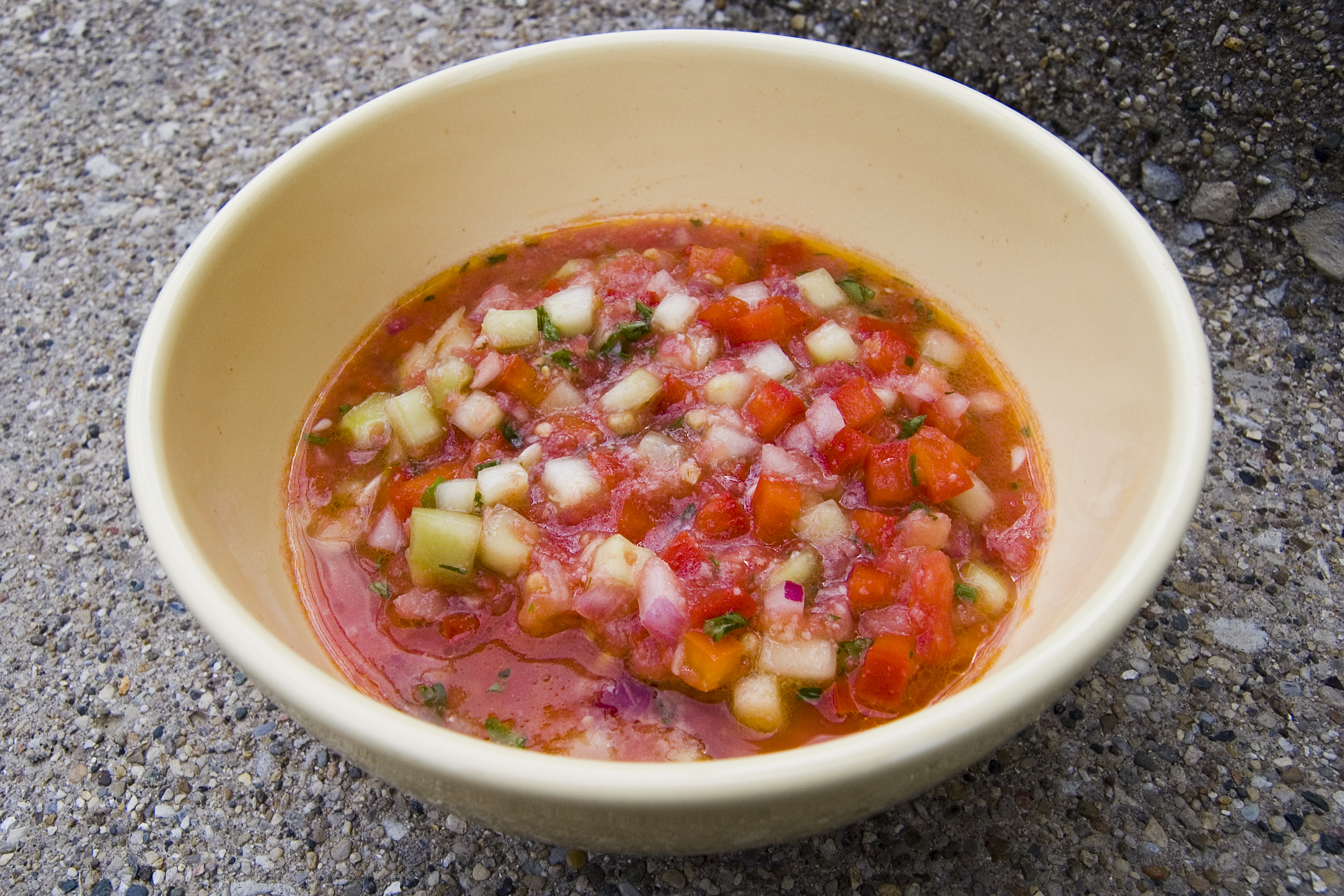
Portuguese Gazpacho prepared with diced ingredients

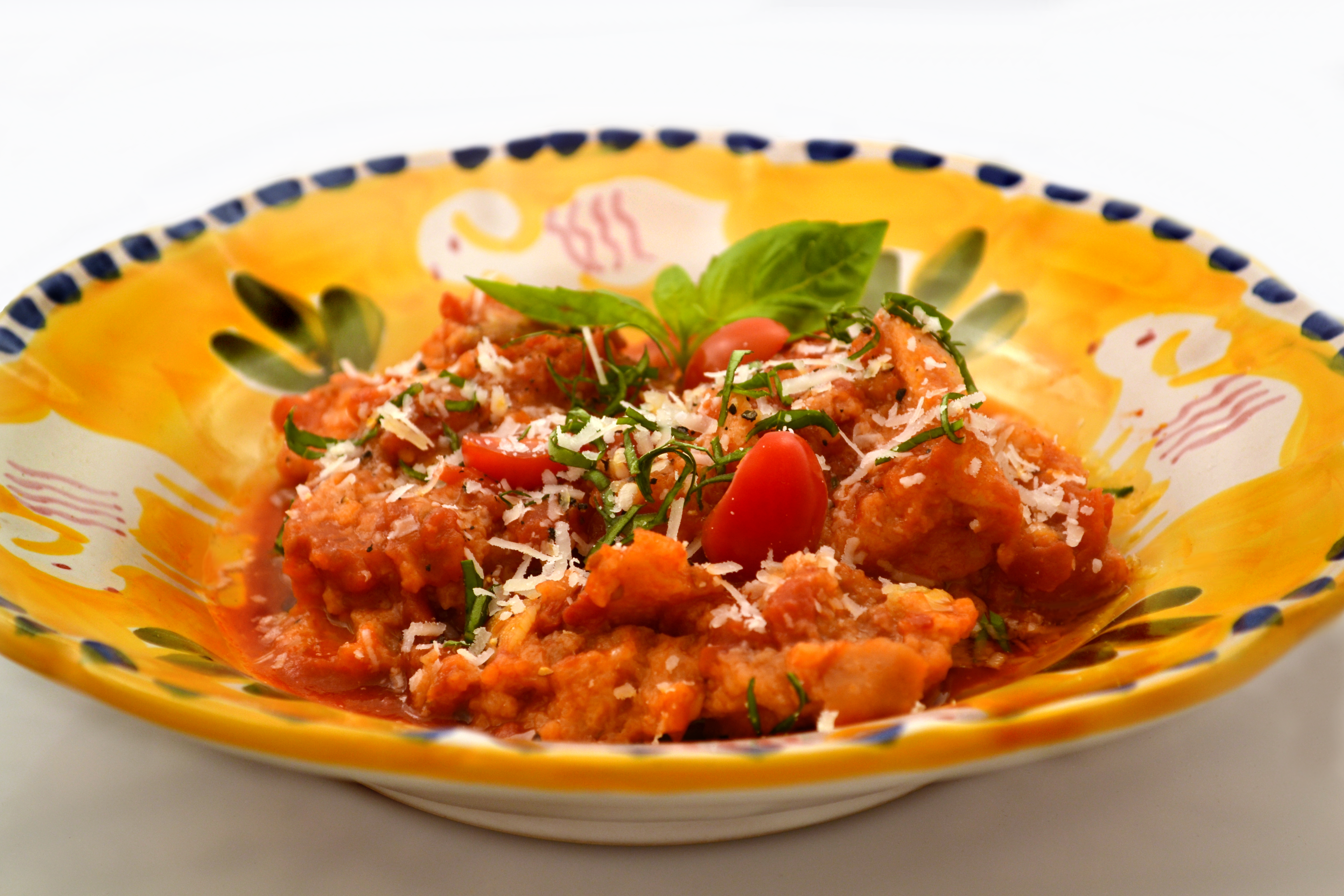
Pappa al pomodoro

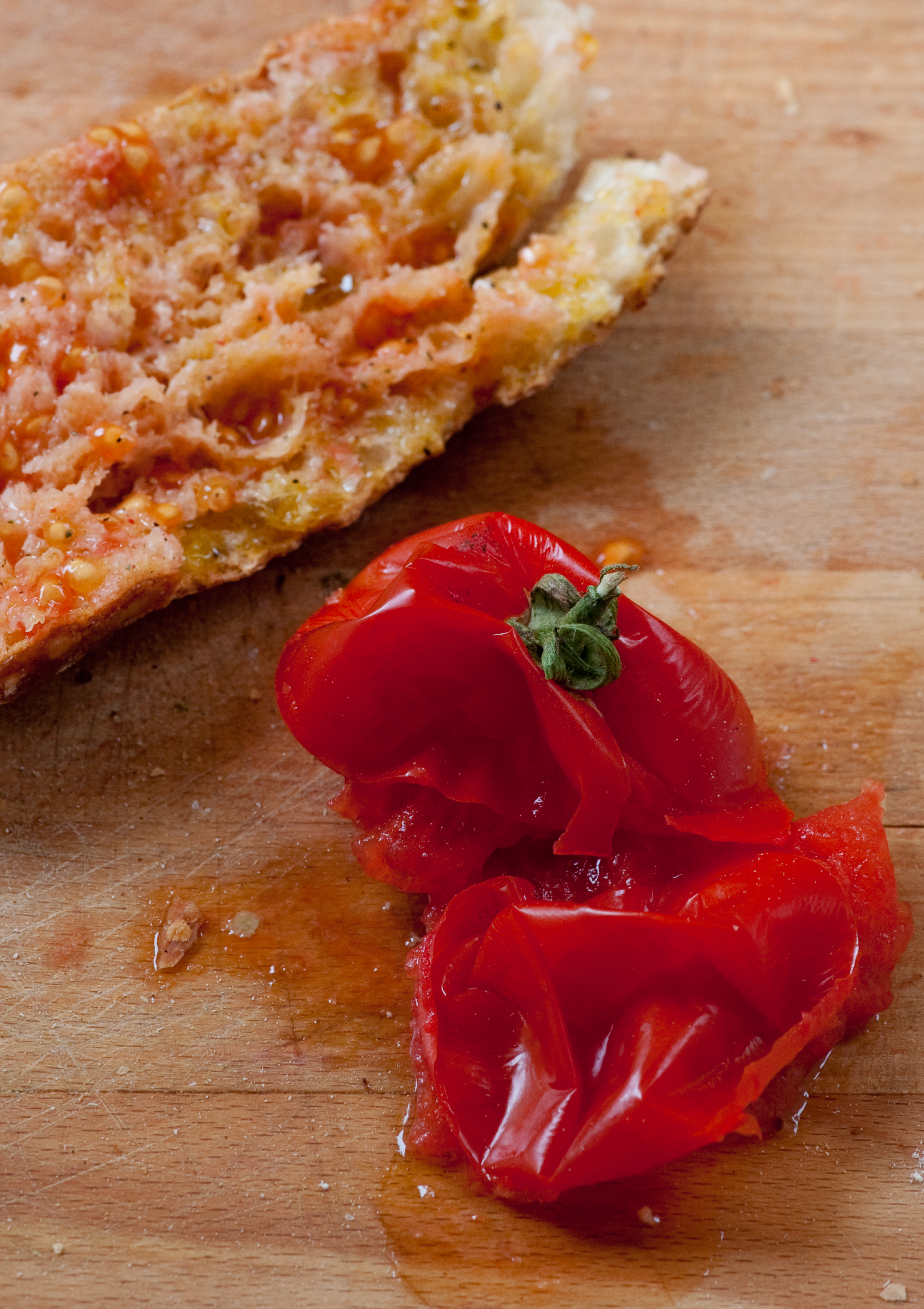
Pa amb tomàquet with the squeezed tomato after its use

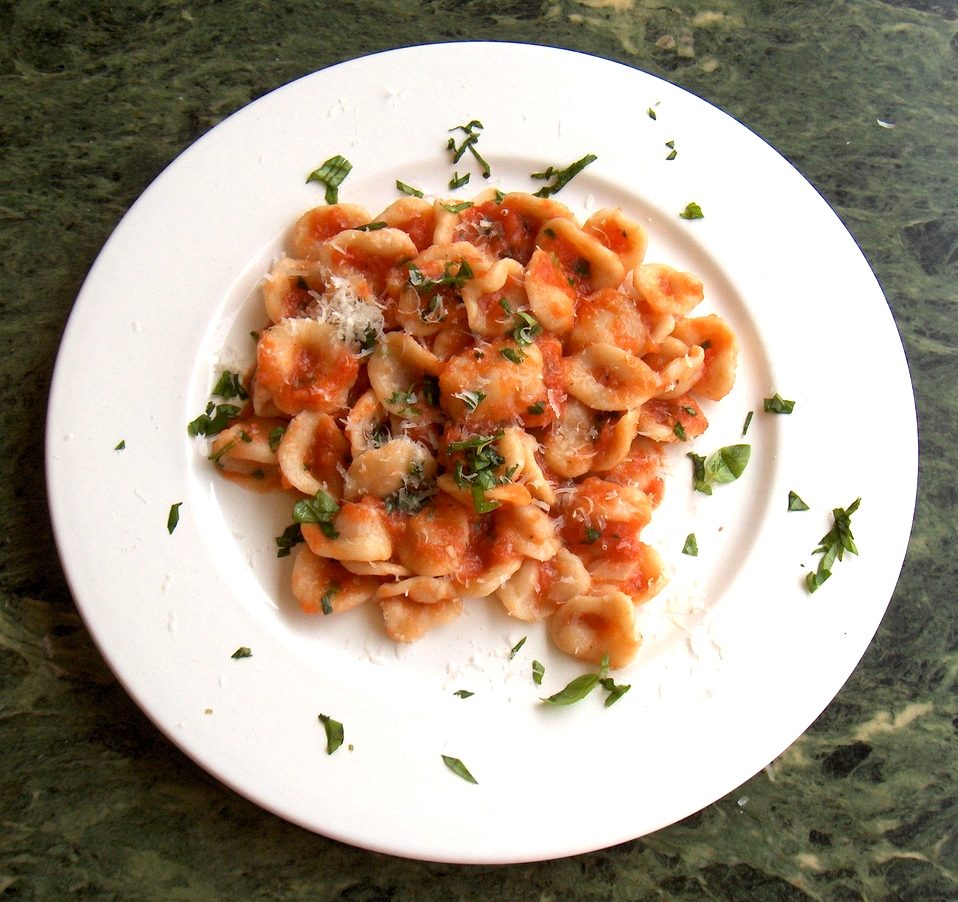
Pasta al pomodoro

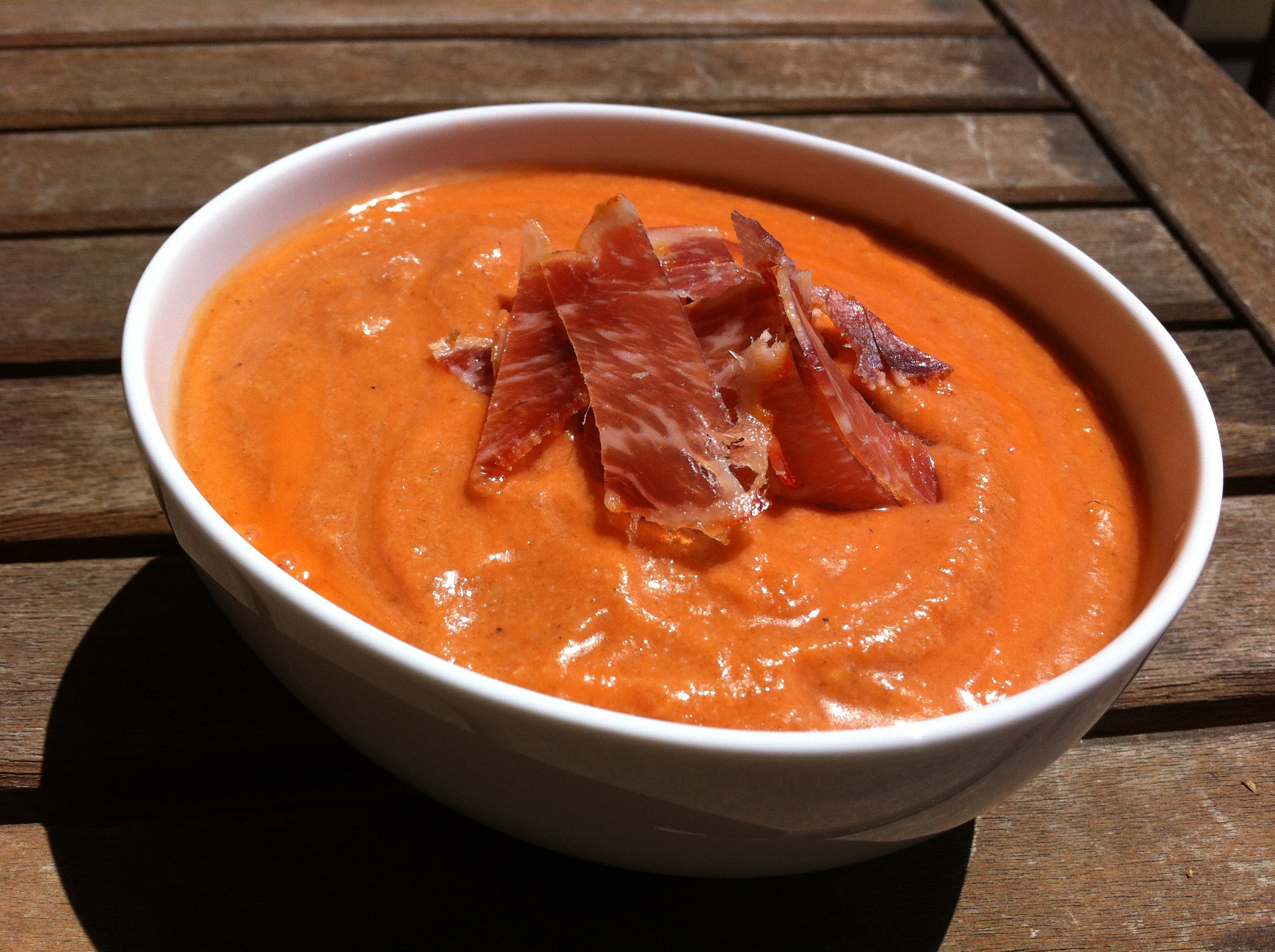
Salmorejo

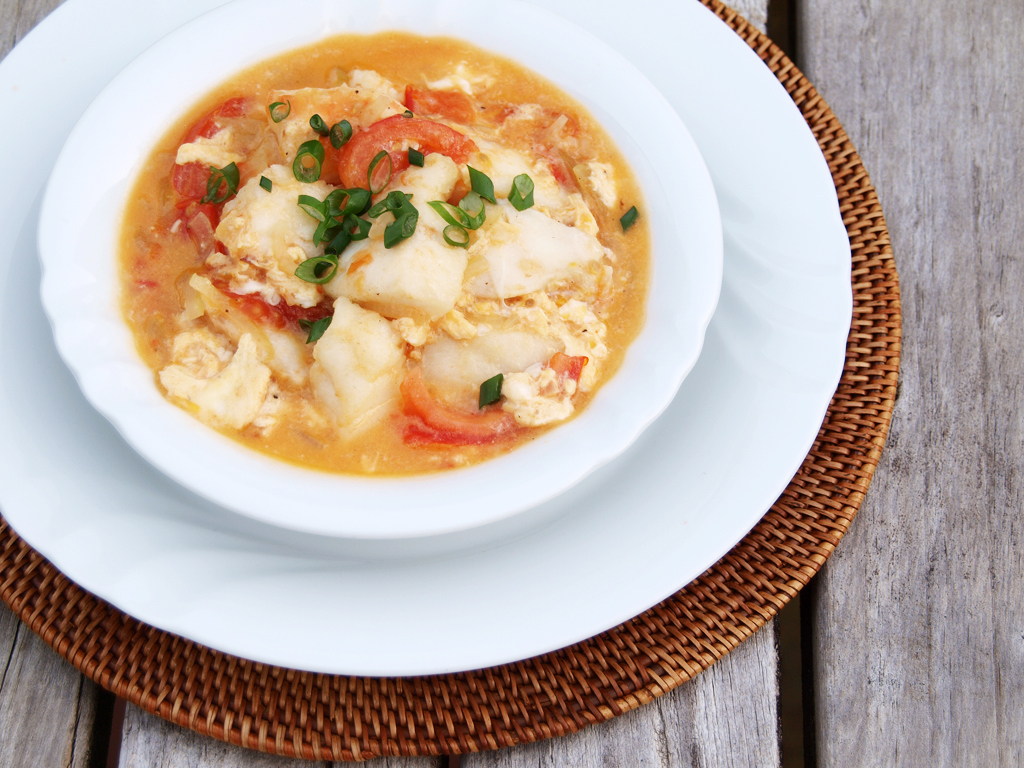
Fish sarsiado

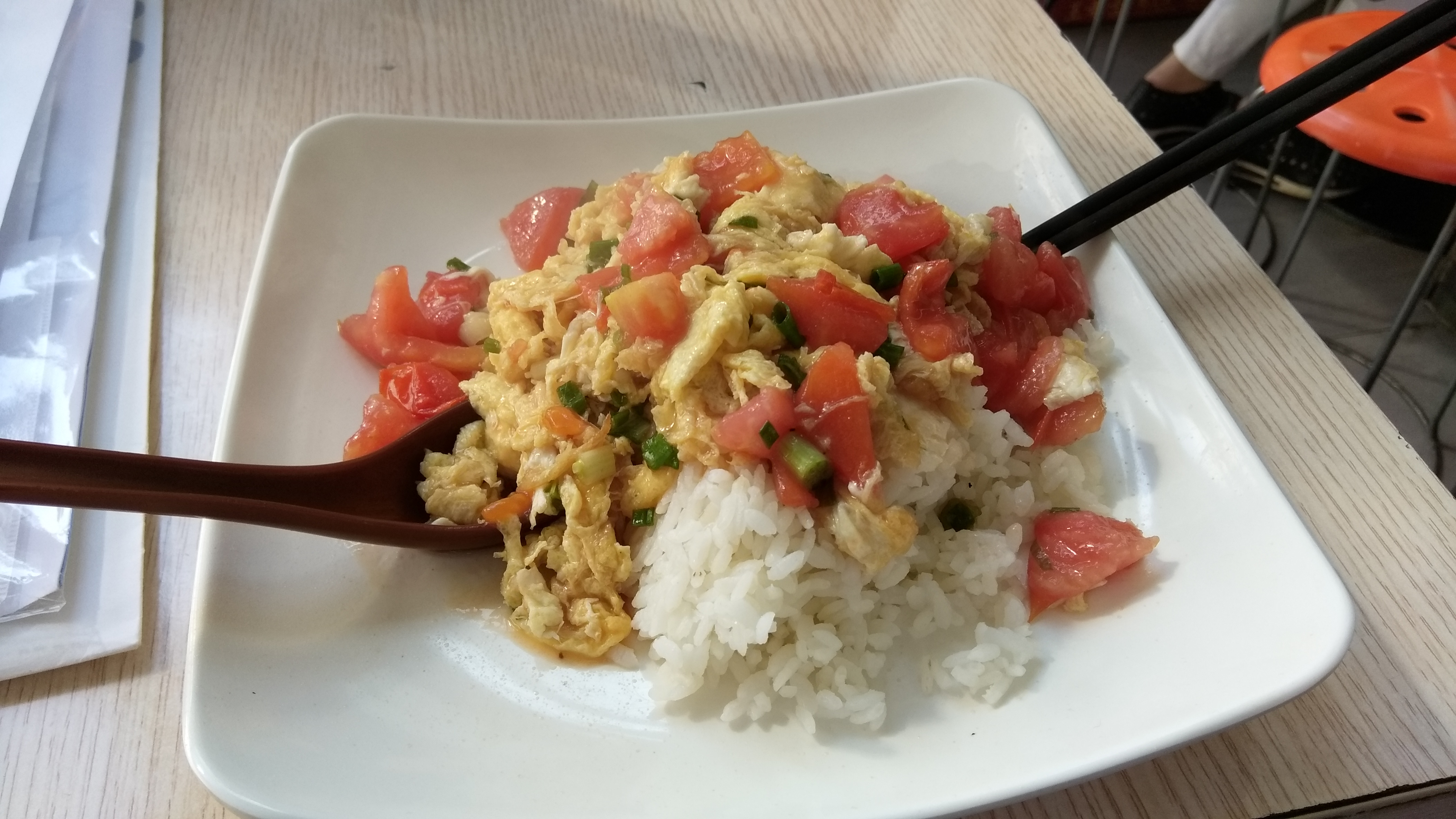
Stir-fried tomato and scrambled eggs

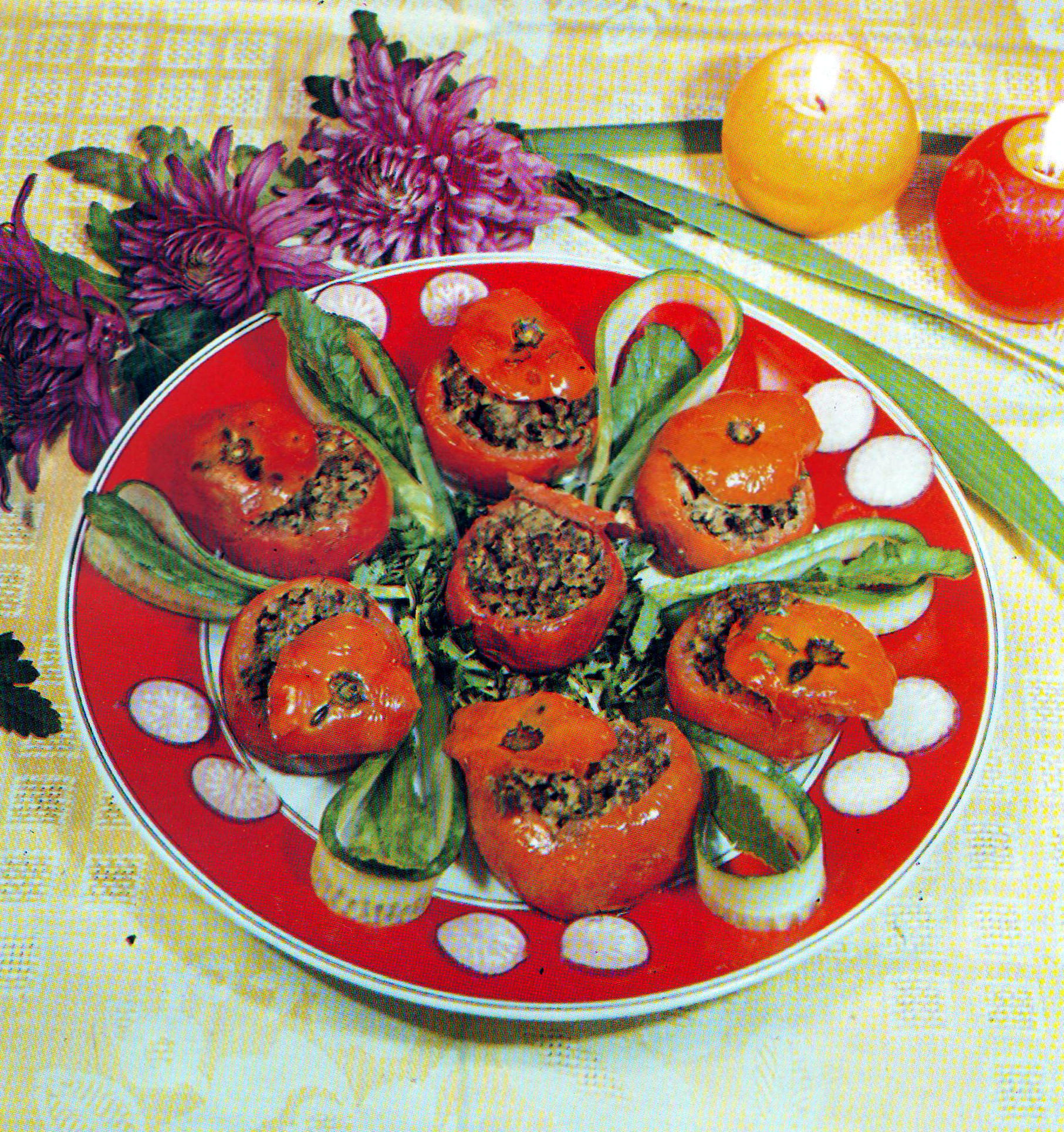
Stuffed tomatoes

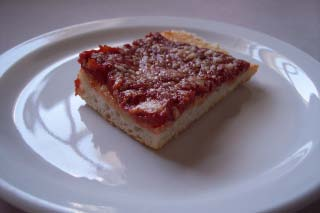
Italian tomato pie

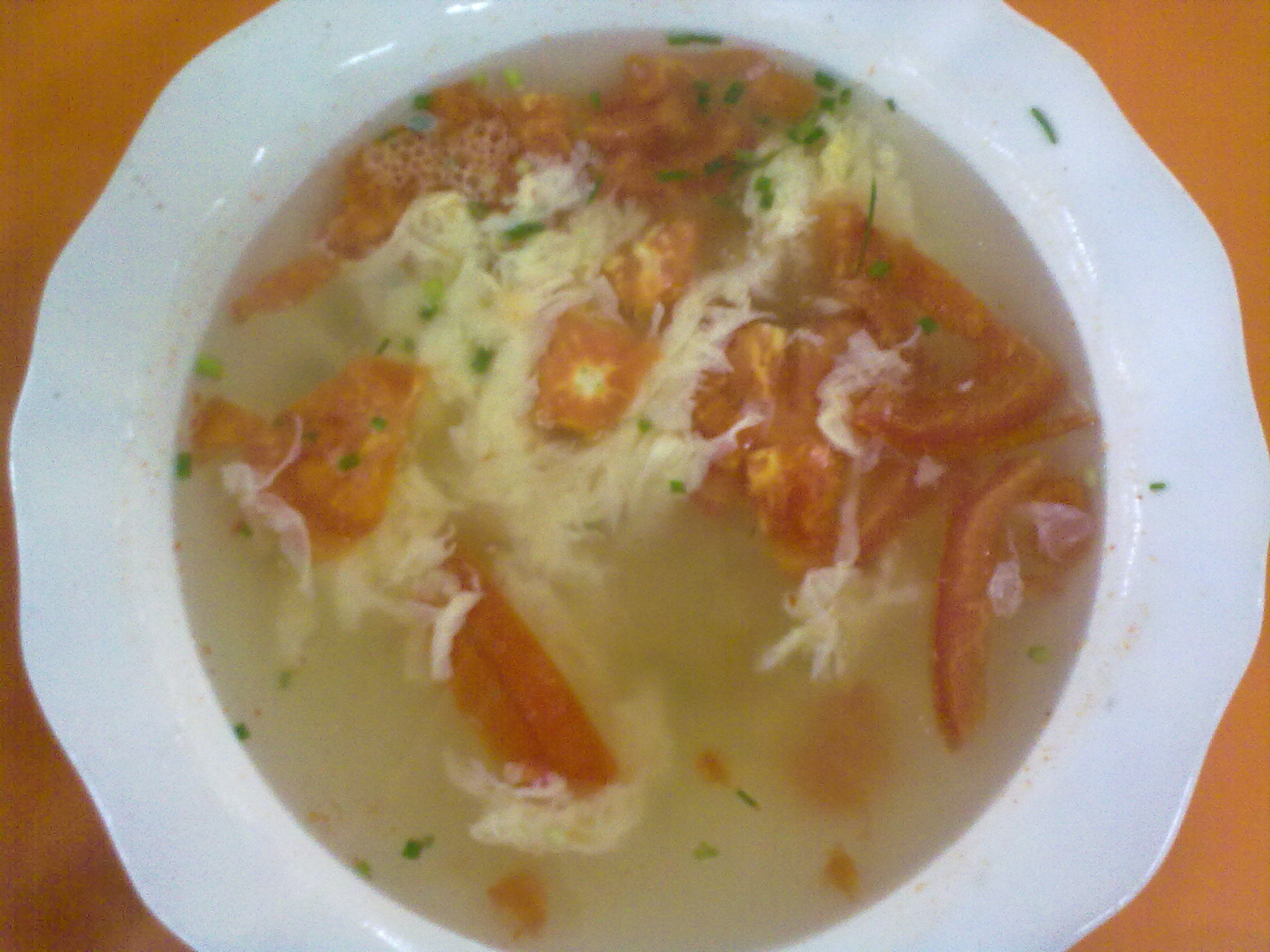
Tomato and egg soup

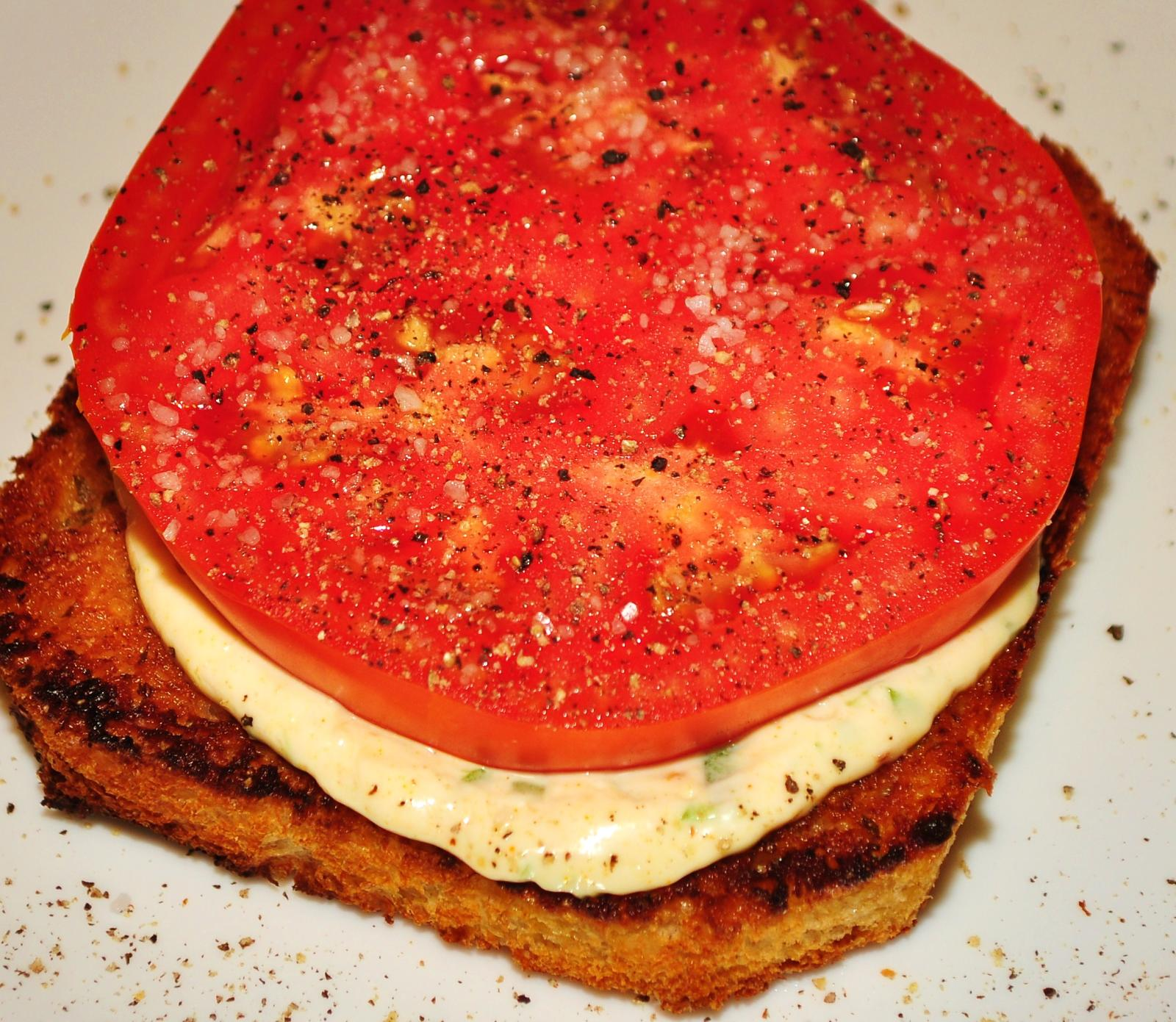
An open-faced tomato sandwich seasoned with salt and pepper atop the tomato

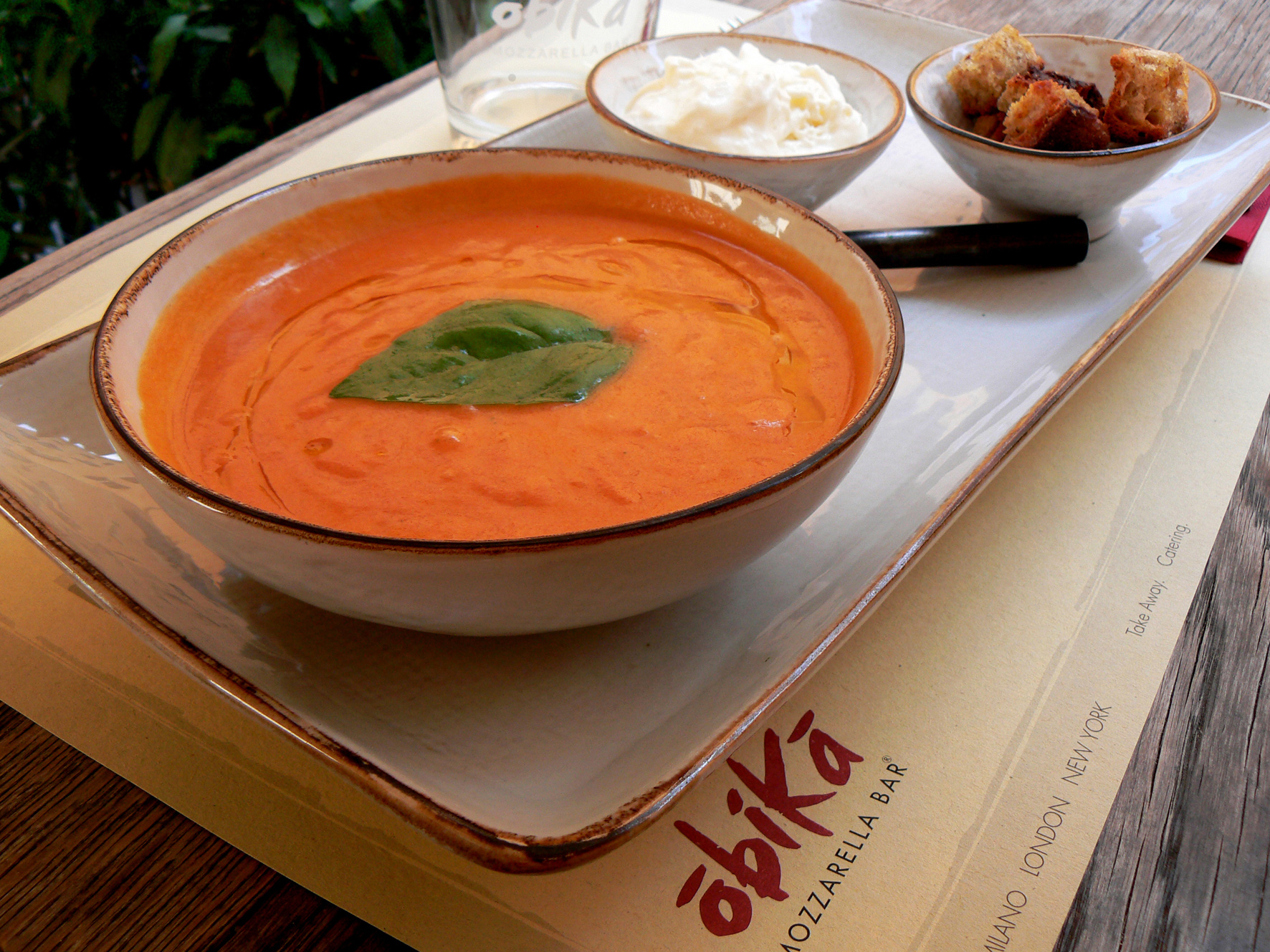
Tomato soup

== See also ==
- Canned tomato
- Ketchup
- List of fruit dishes
- List of tomato cultivars
- List of vegetable dishes
- Sun-dried tomato
- Tomato jam
- Tomato paste
- Tomato purée
- Tomato sauce
- Tomato soup
