= Tomato and egg soup =

Chinese soup dish

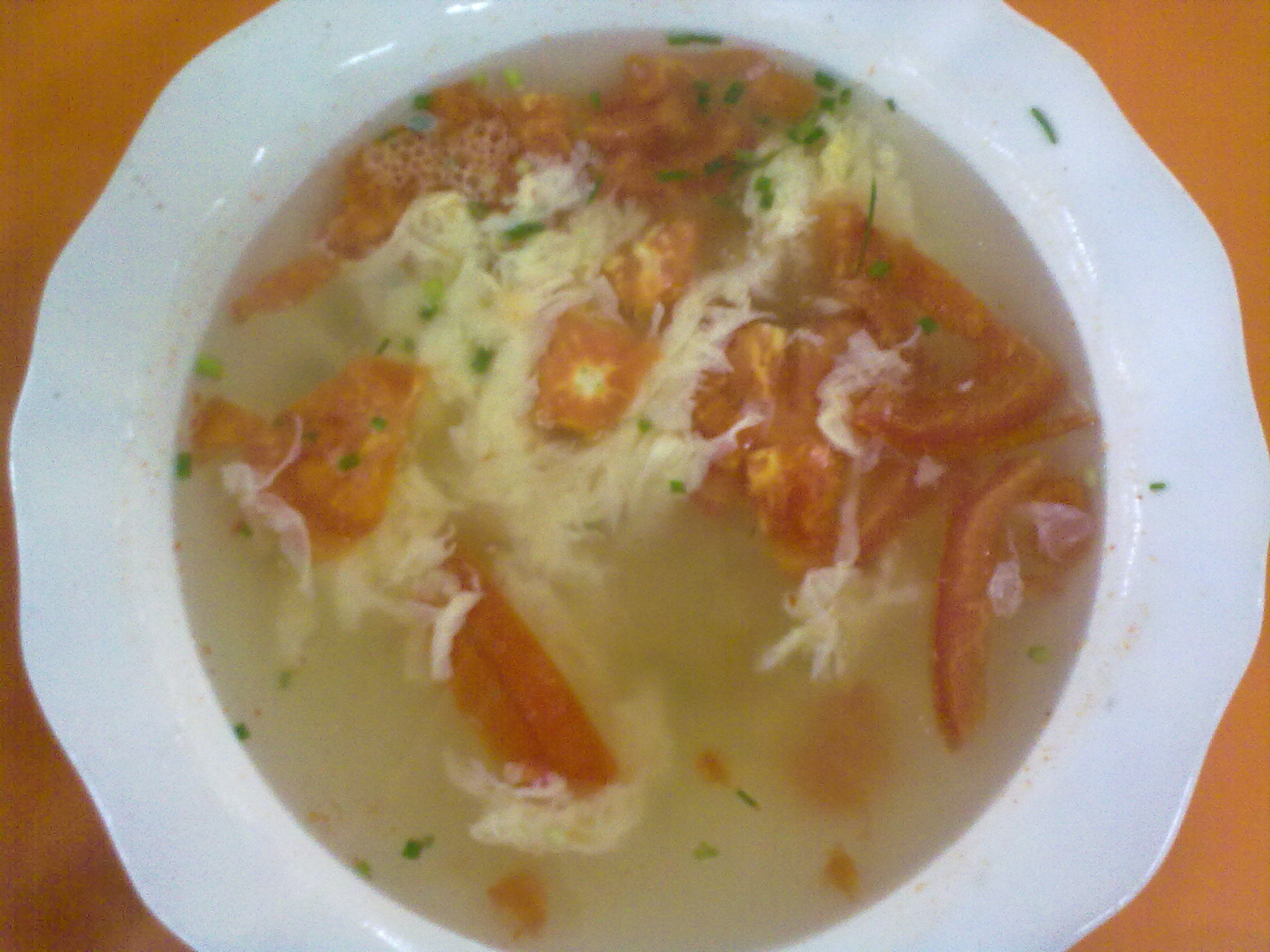
- Type: Soup
- Place of origin: China
- Main ingredients: Tomatoes, eggs, green onions, water

Tomato and egg soup
- Simplified Chinese: 番茄蛋汤
- Traditional Chinese: 番茄蛋湯
Transcriptions
Standard Mandarin
- Hanyu Pinyin: Fānqié dàn tāng

Alternative Chinese name
- Simplified Chinese: 番茄蛋花汤
- Traditional Chinese: 番茄蛋花湯
Transcriptions
Standard Mandarin
- Hanyu Pinyin: Fānqié dàn huā tāng

Tomato and egg soup (Chinese: 番茄蛋汤; pinyin: Fānqié dàn tāng or Chinese: 番茄蛋花汤; pinyin: Fānqié dàn huā tāng) is a dish from China consisting mainly of tomato and egg. It is a relatively easy soup to make, and as such is one of the most popular soups in households.

Normally, the soup is made from coarsely chopped tomatoes, and green onions chopped to pieces of about of 0.5 cm. Half a litre of water is used in this soup, and a small amount of oil. Eggs are added toward the end of this dish, and stirred in for only about 3 minutes. It is normally covered for 2 minutes, and then served when the egg has set.

This soup is also sometimes made with the tomato skin removed, and is sometimes cooked for a longer time.

== Main ingredients ==
- Tomato
- Egg
- Green onion
- Oil
- Salt
- MSG
- Boiling water

== See also ==
- List of Chinese soups
- List of soups
- List of tomato dishes
