= Pasta al pomodoro =

Italian pasta dish

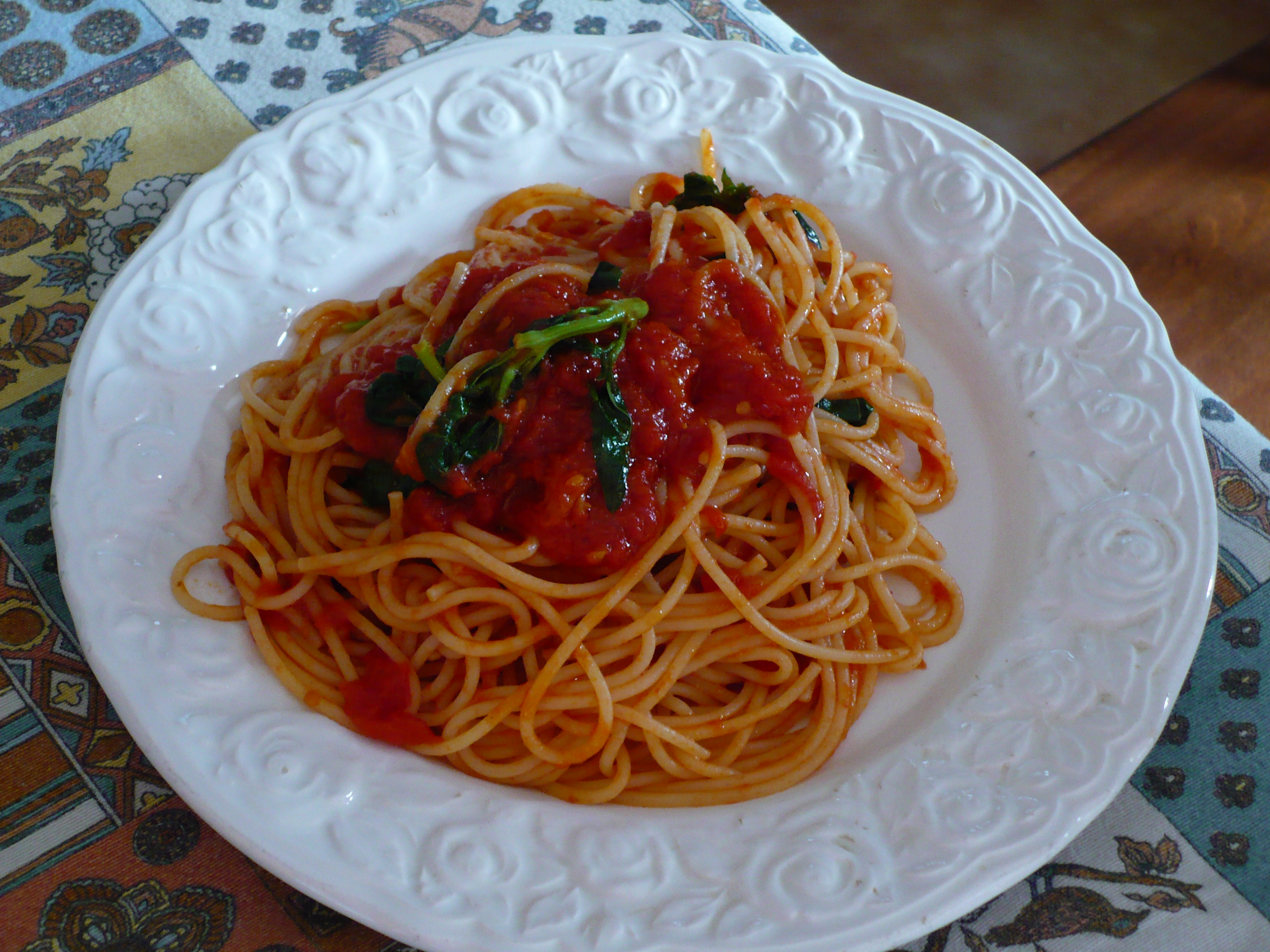
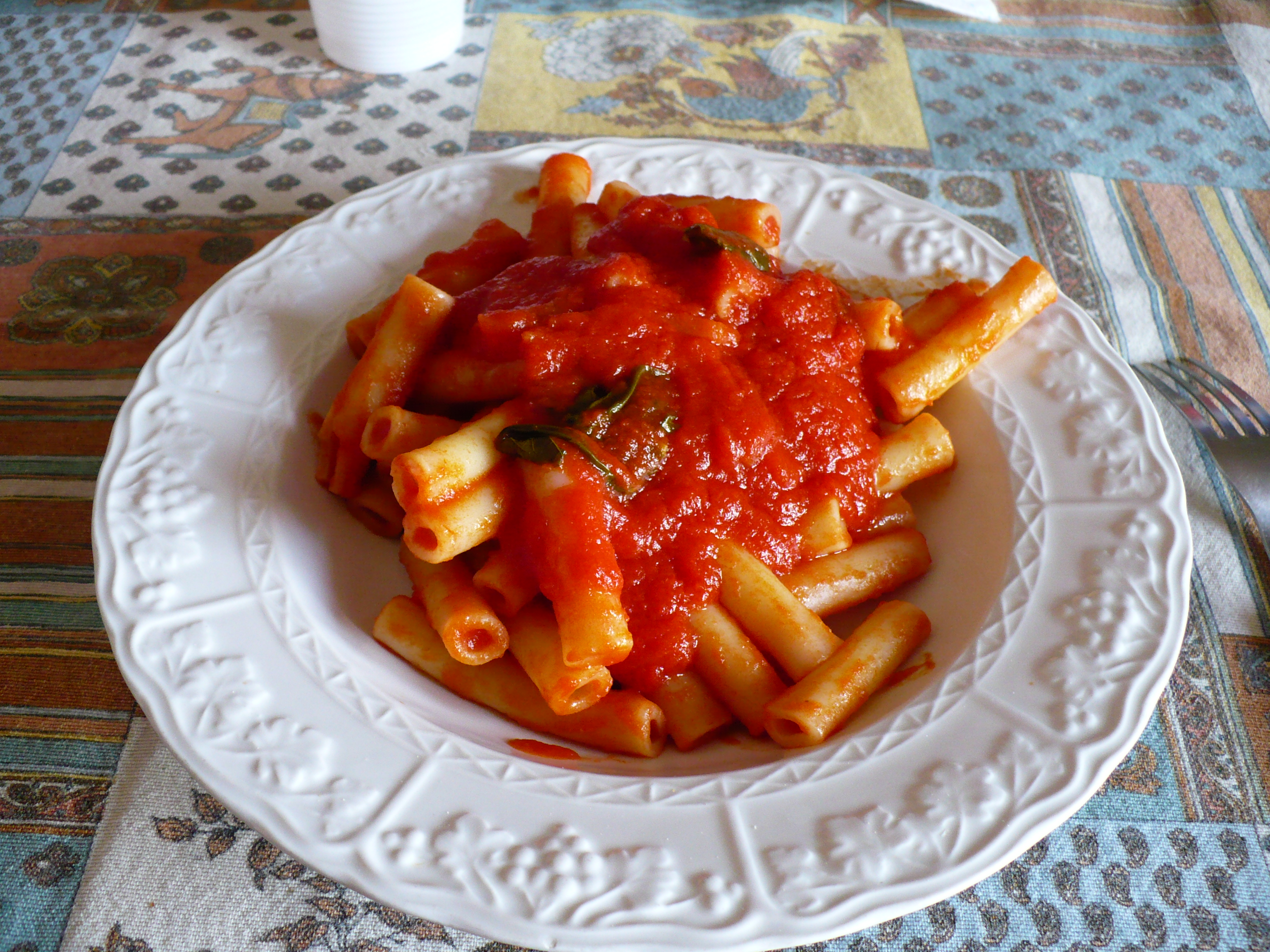
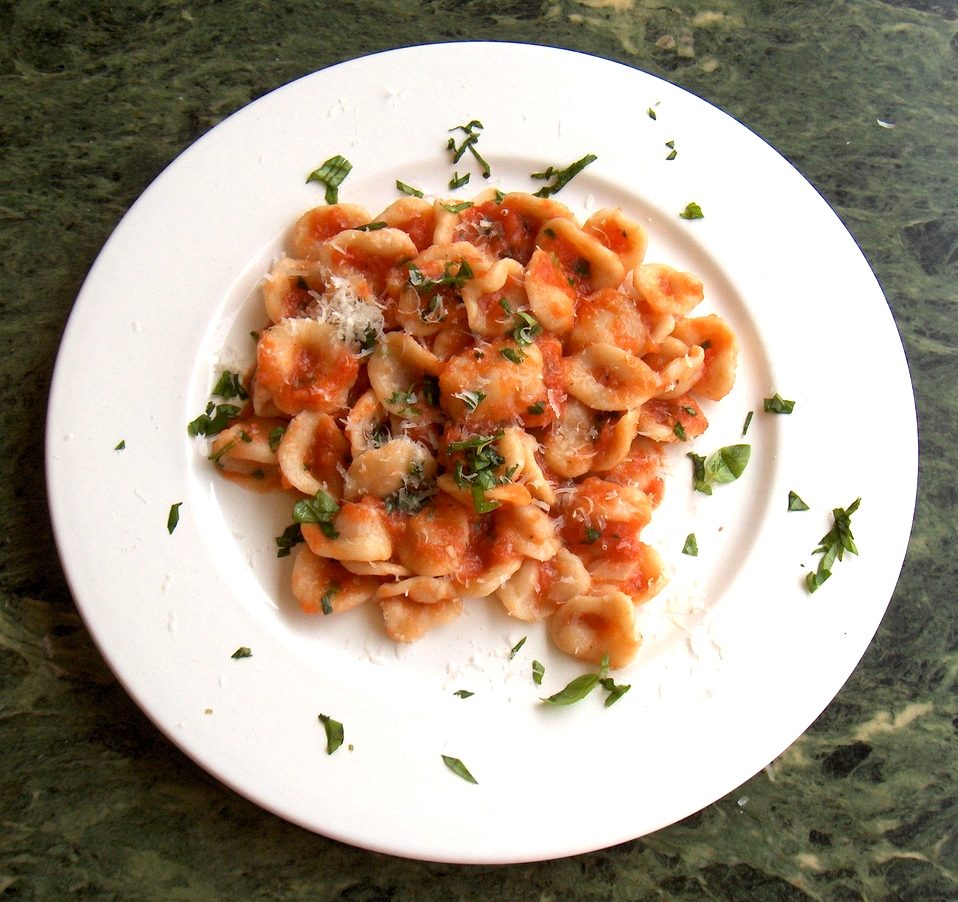
- Course: Primo (Italian course)
- Place of origin: Italy
- Main ingredients: Pasta, tomatoes, extra virgin olive oil, garlic, basil

Pasta al pomodoro (Italian: [ˈpasta al pomoˈdɔːro]) is a pasta dish typically prepared with fresh tomatoes, extra virgin olive oil, garlic, basil, and salt. It is intended to be a quick and light dish, rather than a dish in a heavy sauce.

== Etymology ==
Pomodoro means 'tomato' in Italian. More specifically, pomodoro is a univerbation of pomo ('apple') + d ('of') + oro ('gold'), possibly because the first varieties of tomatoes arriving in Europe and spreading from Spain to Italy and North Africa were yellow, with the earliest attestation (of the archaic plural form pomi d'oro) going back to Pietro Andrea Mattioli (1544).

A red strain was later developed in Africa, which came to be known in Italy as pomo dei morì ('apple of the Moors').

== See also ==
Media related to Tomato sauce pasta at Wikimedia Commons Tomato Pasta at the Wikibooks Cookbook subproject

- List of pasta
- List of pasta dishes
- List of tomato dishes
