= Stewed tomatoes =

Type of food

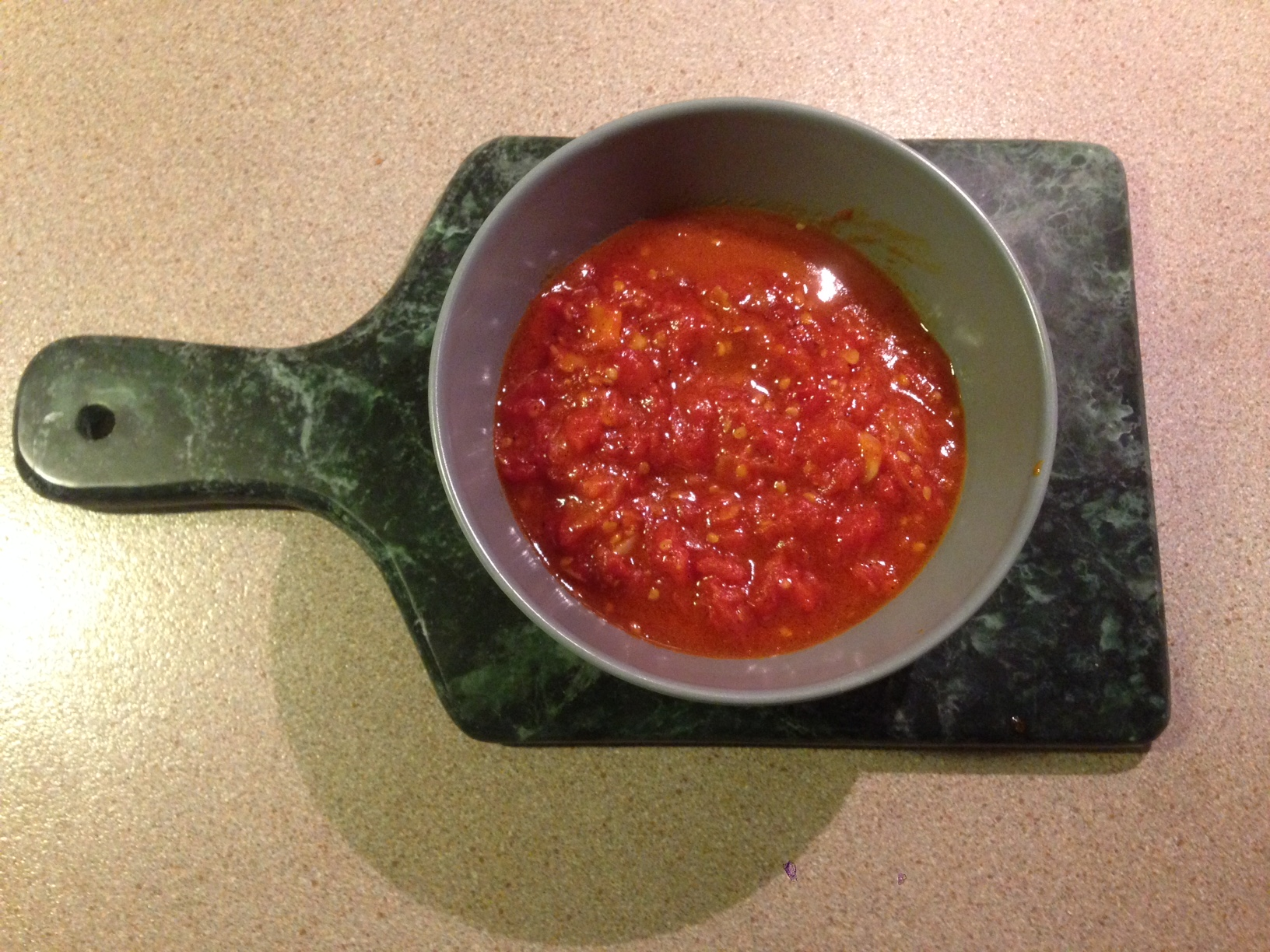
Tomato sauce by Süleyman

Stewed tomatoes is a dish made by cooking tomatoes in a stew. It is often cooked with garlic and herbs, and consumed with bread or meat. It is eaten as either a main dish or a side dish. Stewed tomatoes are sometimes prepared in the United States on occasions such as Thanksgiving.

== History ==
Food historian Andrew F. Smith stated that stewed tomatoes became popular in the United States in the early 19th century, with recipes appearing as early as 1829, as tomatoes in general became popular in the United States. Stewed tomatoes commonly appeared in restaurants in the 1840s. Canned stewed tomatoes were common starting in the 1940s. Currently, the dish is prepared on special occasions like Thanksgiving, in American kitchens, often as a combination with casseroles and puddings. Noted food historian Betty Fussell stated that stewed tomatoes were one of the most loved and common dishes for her grandfather's generation. She adds that she remembers heating tomatoes and adding butter, salt and sugar in it, to create a dish that was served with bread on a daily basis. In 2019, Dayton.com, a news website based in Dayton, Ohio, reported that stewed tomatoes were popular in Dayton restaurants.

== Preparations ==
Tomatoes, red, ripe, cooked, stewed
Nutritional value per 100 g (3.5 oz)
- Energy: 331 kJ (79 kcal)
- Carbohydrates: 13g
- Dietary fibre: 1.7g
- Fat: 2.68g
- Protein: 1.96g
Vitamins and minerals
Vitamins	Quantity %DV^{†}
Vitamin A equiv.	4% 33 μg
Thiamine (B1)	9% 0.108 mg
Riboflavin (B2)	6% 0.08 mg
Niacin (B3)	7% 1.11 mg
Pantothenic acid (B5)	5% 0.256 mg
Vitamin B6	5% 0.0886 mg
Folate (B9)	3% 11 μg
Vitamin B12	0% 0 μg
Vitamin C	20% 18.2 mg
Vitamin D	0% 0 μg
Minerals	Quantity %DV^{†}
Calcium	2% 26 mg
Copper	11% 0.095 mg
Iron	6% 1.06 mg
Magnesium	4% 15 mg
Manganese	8% 0.193 mg
Phosphorus	3% 38 mg
Potassium	8% 247 mg
Selenium	2% 1.2 μg
Sodium	20% 455 mg
Zinc	2% 0.18 mg
- Other constituents: Quantity
- Water: 80.6g
- ^{†}Percentages estimated using US recommendations for adults, except for potassium, which is estimated based on expert recommendation from the National Academies.

The earliest recipe of the dish appears in The Frugal Housewife, published by Lydia Maria Child in 1829. Child has explained a simple recipe of a catsup created by boiling tomatoes in hot water and adding herbs and garlic which can be served as a side dish with chowder and meat. However, over the decades there have been variations.

=== Preparing ===
Stewed tomato recipes often include sugar, peppers, onions, and salt. Stewed tomatoes can be canned with tomato juice and other ingredients.

== See also ==
- List of tomato dishes
