= Tomato purée =

Food

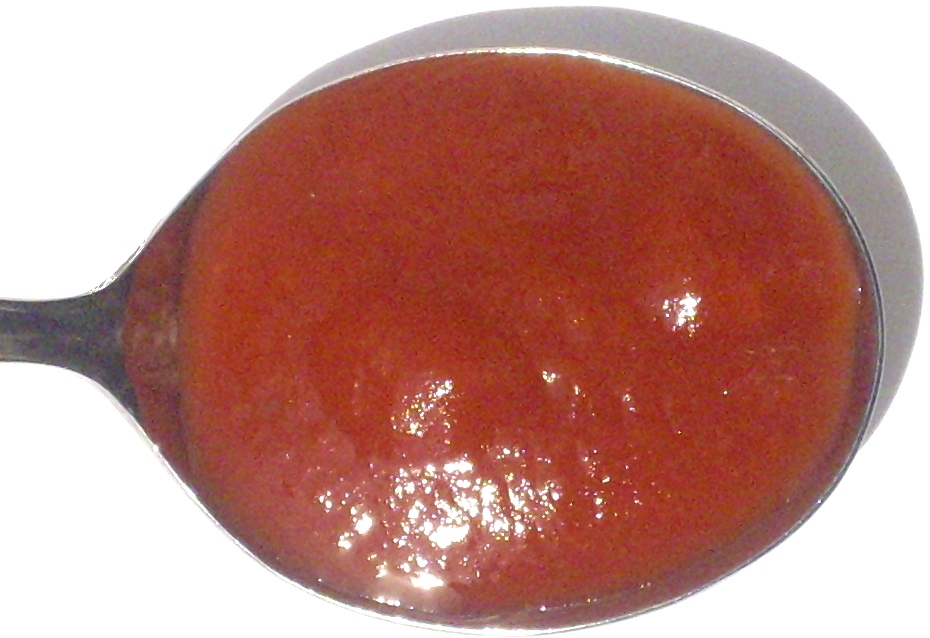
A spoonful of tomato purée

Tomato purée is a thick liquid made by cooking and straining tomatoes. The main difference between tomato paste, tomato purée, and tomato sauce is consistency; tomato puree has a thicker consistency and a deeper flavour than sauce.

== Differences ==
The definitions of tomato purée vary from country to country. In the US, tomato purée is a processed food product, usually consisting of only tomatoes, but can also be found in the seasoned form. It differs from tomato sauce or tomato paste in consistency and content; tomato purée generally lacks the additives common to a complete tomato sauce and does not have the thickness of paste.

The standard consistency of tomato puree is more than or equal to 7% but less than 24% natural total soluble solids.

== Passata di pomodoro ==
Passata di pomodoro is an uncooked tomato purée, strained of seeds and skins. Passata derives from the Italian verb passare, meaning 'to go through'.

== See also ==
- List of tomato dishes
- Tomato sauce
