= Tomato paste =

Paste made from tomatoes

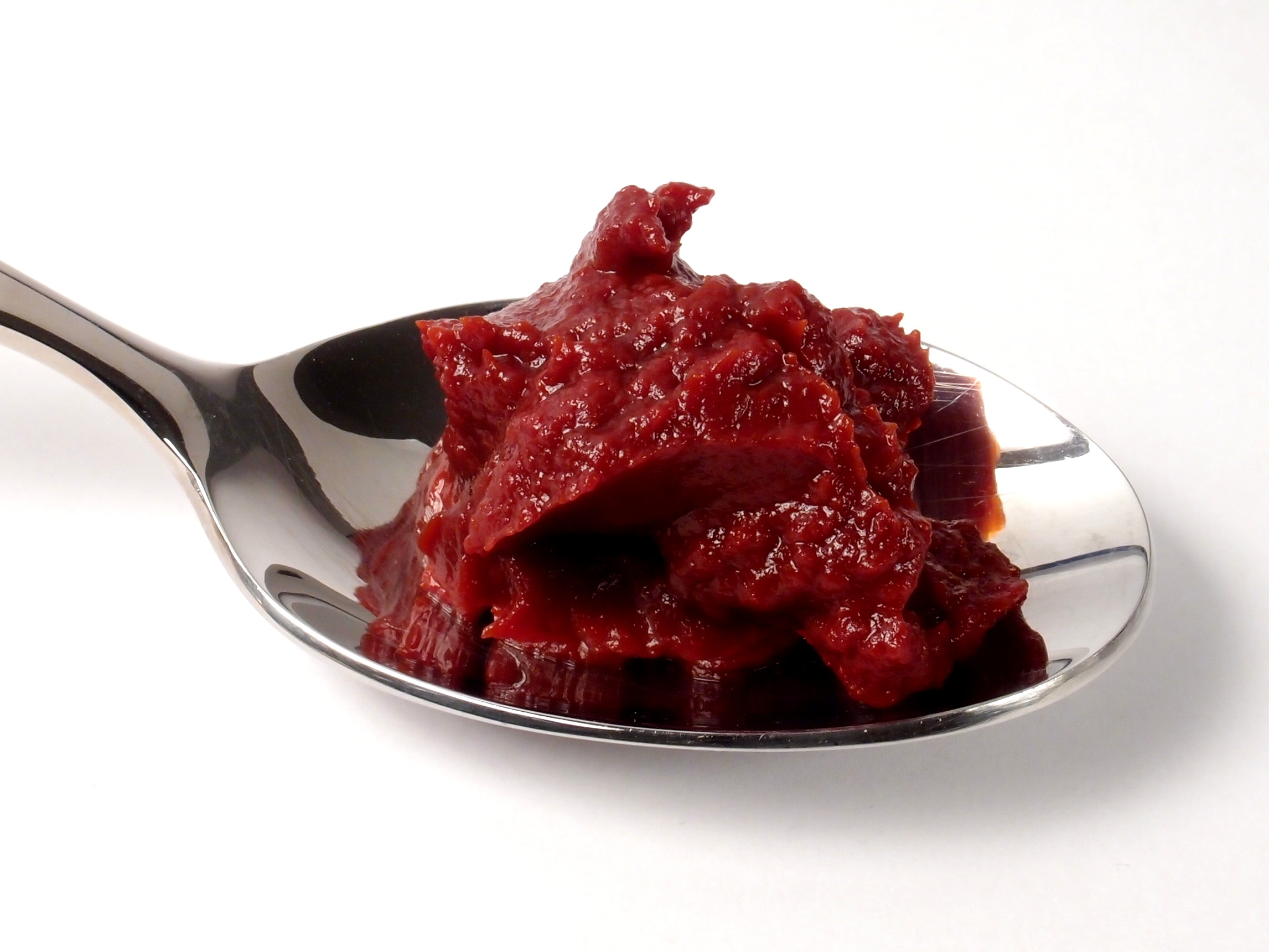
Tomato paste

Tomato paste is a thick paste made from tomatoes, which are cooked for several hours to reduce water content. The seeds and skins are then strained out and the liquid is cooked again to reduce to a thick, rich concentrate. Tomato paste is used to impart an intense tomato flavour in dishes such as pasta, soups and braised meat. It is used as an ingredient in many world cuisines.

By contrast, tomato purée is a liquid with a thinner consistency than tomato paste, while tomato sauce is even thinner in consistency.

== History and traditions ==
Tomato paste is a traditional food ingredient used in many cuisines. One traditional practice in Northern Italy involved spreading out a much-reduced tomato sauce on wooden boards that were set outdoors under the hot sun to dry the paste until it was thick enough, when it was scraped up and held together in a dense mass. Commercial production uses tomatoes with thick pericarp walls and lower overall moisture.

=== Regional differences ===
Tomato paste in Iran is made by cooking tomatoes for a long time to reduce the water content, removing the seeds and skin, and cooking it more to make a thick condiment. In the US, tomato paste is simply concentrated tomato solids (no seeds or skin), and with a standard of identity (in the Code of Federal Regulations, see 21 CFR 155.191). Tomato purée has a lower tomato soluble solids requirement, the cutoff being 24%. For comparison, typical fresh round tomatoes have a soluble solid content of 3.5–5.5% (refractometric Brix), while cherry tomatoes have double the amount.

Flavor is generally related to the relative concentrations of sugars and acids in the fruit, mainly fructose and citric acid. The best, most flavorsome combination is a high sugar and high acid content. Crop nutrition can influence tomato taste.

== Uses ==
Tomato paste is added to dishes to impart an intense flavour, particularly the natural umami flavour found in tomatoes. Examples of dishes in which tomato paste may be commonly used include pasta sauces, soups, and braised meat. The paste is typically added early in the cooking process and sautéed to achieve caramelization.

Based on the manufacturing conditions, the paste can be the basis for making ketchup or reconstituted tomato juice:

- Hot break: heated to about 100 °C (212 °F), pectin is preserved, paste is thicker and can be used for ketchup
- Warm break: heated to about 79 °C (174 °F), colour is not preserved, but flavour is preserved
- Cold break: heated to about 66 °C (151 °F), colour and flavour are preserved, so it can be reconstituted into juice

== See also ==
- Salça – tomato paste from Turkey
- Chili sauce and paste
- List of tomato dishes
