= Porra antequerana =

Andalusian soup

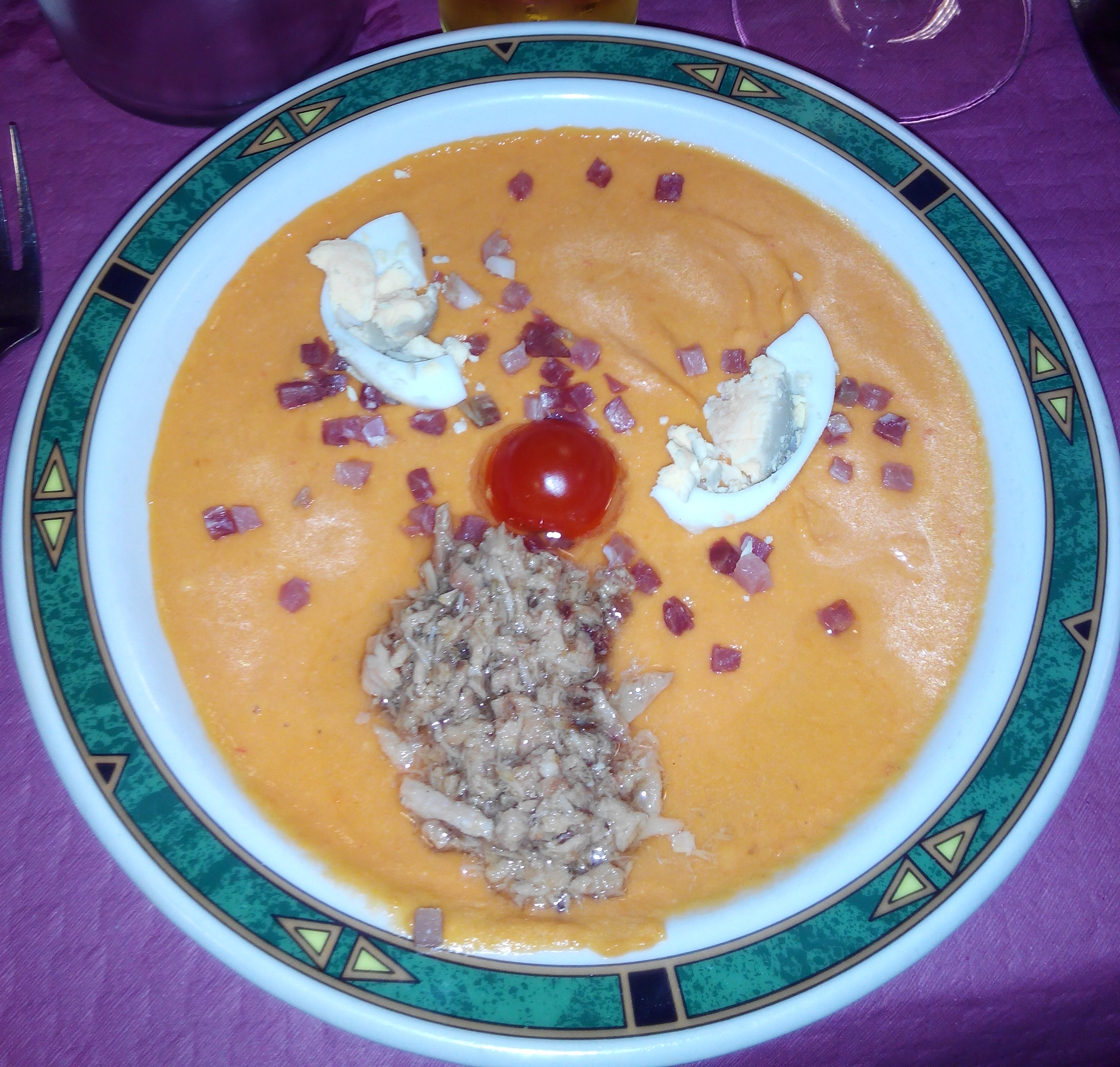
- Bowl of porra antequerana
- Type: Gazpacho
- Place of origin: Spain
- Region or state: Andalusia
- Serving temperature: Cold
- Main ingredients: Tomatoes, dried bread

Porra antequerana is a part of the gazpacho family of soups originating in Andalusia, in southern Spain. Porra antequerana consists of tomato and dried bread. As it is much thicker than its culinary cousins, gazpacho and salmorejo, it is more commonly served as tapas, not soup. Like all soups in this family, there can be variations on the recipe. The word 'Antequerana' derives from the town of Antequera. Porra is a type of club or truncheon and the use of the word in the dish's name likely refers to its traditional preparation with mortar and pestle.

The original recipe was served cold with bread, tomatoes, vegetables, olive oil, garlic, hard-boiled eggs, ham, and nearly anything else peasants may have had on hand. These ingredients were made into a purée with a mortar (porra). The soup later started to be served cold, mostly as a tapa. It can have many variations such as serving with tuna on top.

== See also ==
- List of cold soups
- List of tomato dishes
