= Tim Gurner =

Founder of Australian luxury real estate developer Gurner Group

Tim Gurner is an Australian businessman. He is the founder of Gurner Group.

== Business ==
Gurner is known as a developer of luxury apartments in Australia. He has been involved with build-to-rent projects in Parramatta. He has been described by The Australian as an 'apartment wunderkind'.

Projects pursued by Gurner include: a joint venture with the Liberman family to develop a $1.75b mixed-use precinct in Docklands, Victoria, a $200m apartment development of 189 Kent St in Sydney, build-to-rent projects, and an anti-ageing private social club. When sold in 2019, the David Hicks designed penthouse of Gurner's St Moritz development in St Kilda, Victoria, broke national sales records to become the second most expensive apartment in Australia.

== Controversies ==
Gurner said in May 2017 that millennials should not be buying smashed avocado on toast and $4 lattes in their pursuit of home ownership. These comments became a prominent topic in Australian media. In public reply, some estimated the savings of forgoing avocado on toast would be an estimated €500 annually, and that at that rate it would take over 500 years to save for a house in the Republic of Ireland. The comments have been compared to David Bach's "Latte Factor".

In September 2023, speaking at the Australian Financial Review Property Summit, Gurner said that unemployment should rise by 40–50%, because workers had become too arrogant and "pain in the economy" was required to change attitudes. He also stated that governments around the world were working towards that aim.
