= 1501 Uptown Gastropub =

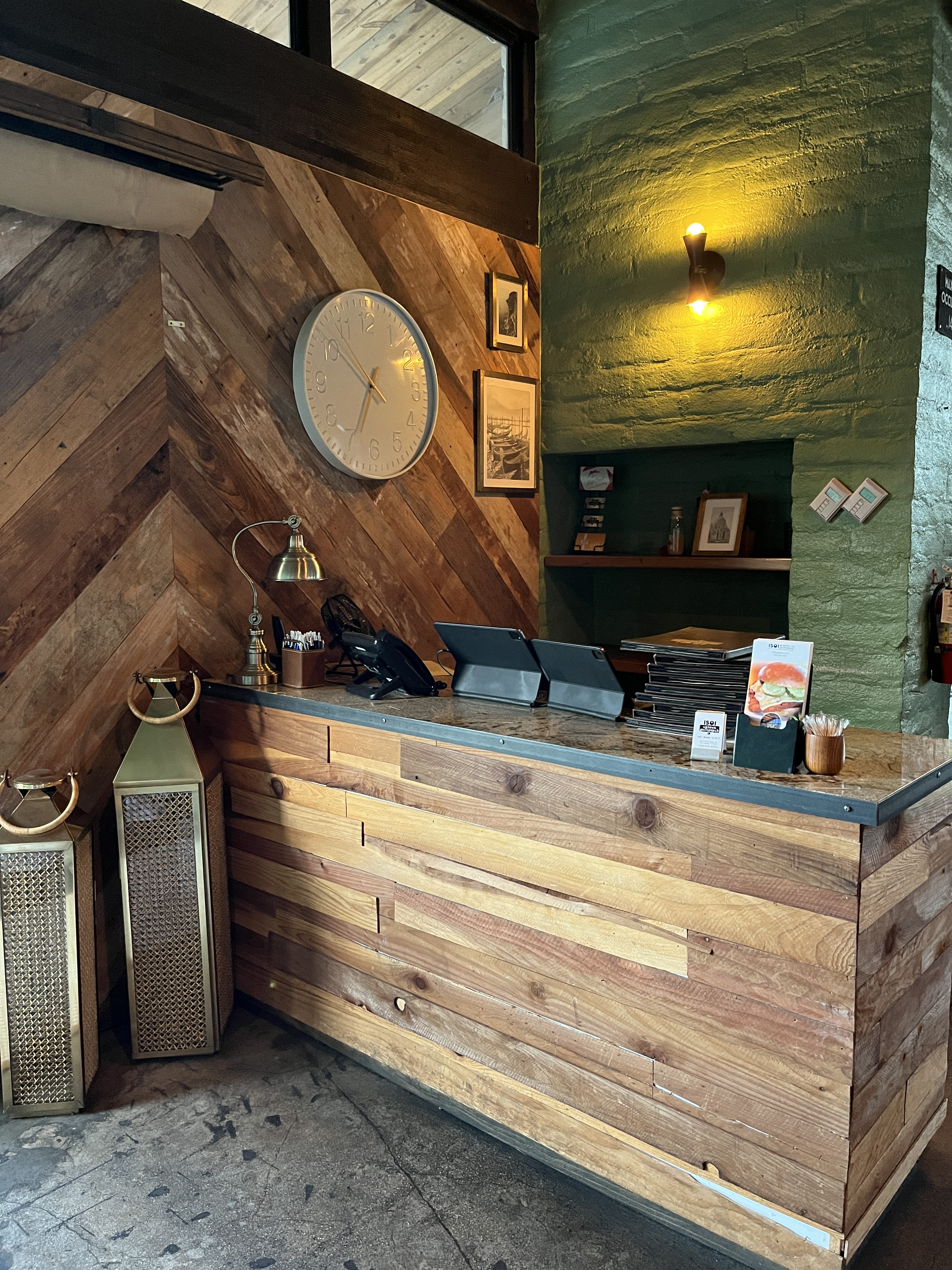
- Interactive map of 1501 Uptown Gastropub

Restaurant information
- Food type: American
- Location: 1501 N Palm Canyon Drive, Palm Springs, California, 92262, United States
- Coordinates: 33.8433°N 116.5472°W
- Website: 1501uptown.com

1501 Uptown Gastropub, or simply Uptown Gastropub, is a restaurant in Palm Springs, California.

== Description ==
1501 Uptown Gastropub is a restaurant in Palm Springs, California. The open-air space was designed by Chris Pardo. Uptown Gastropub has glass architecture, rollup garage doors, and vinyl booths. The dog-friendly gastropub has an outdoor dining patio.

The American menu has also included burgers and sandwiches, soups, salads, Kobe short ribs, lobster claw and blue crab mac and beer cheese, shepherd's pie, and Thai shrimp, as well as bourbon and sour cherry bread pudding. The avocado toast has vegan sourdough with heirloom tomatoes and pickled red onions. Drinks include the Lemon Drop and the Hot N' Skinny margarita.

== History ==
Chad Gardner and Willie Rhine opened 1501 Uptown Gastropub during the COVID-19 pandemic, in the space previously occupied by Draughtsman Restaurant.

== Reception ==
Sharael Kolberg included the business in U.S. News & World Report's 2022 list of the twenty best restaurants in Palm Springs.
