= Yabchanka =

Ukrainian apple dessert

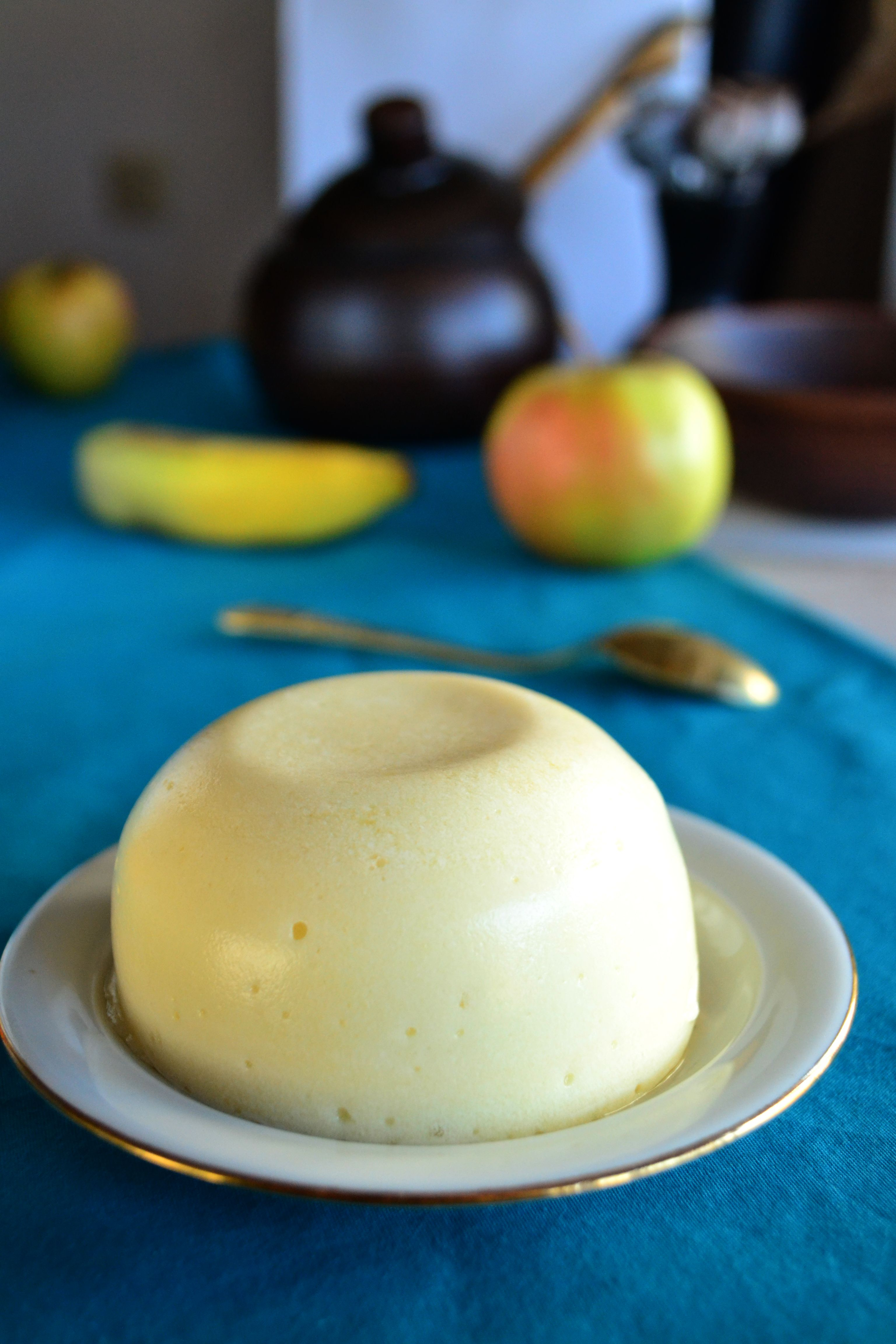
- Sour cream yabchanka
- Alternative names: яблучанка
- Type: mousse
- Place of origin: Ukraine
- Serving temperature: cold
- Main ingredients: apple; egg white

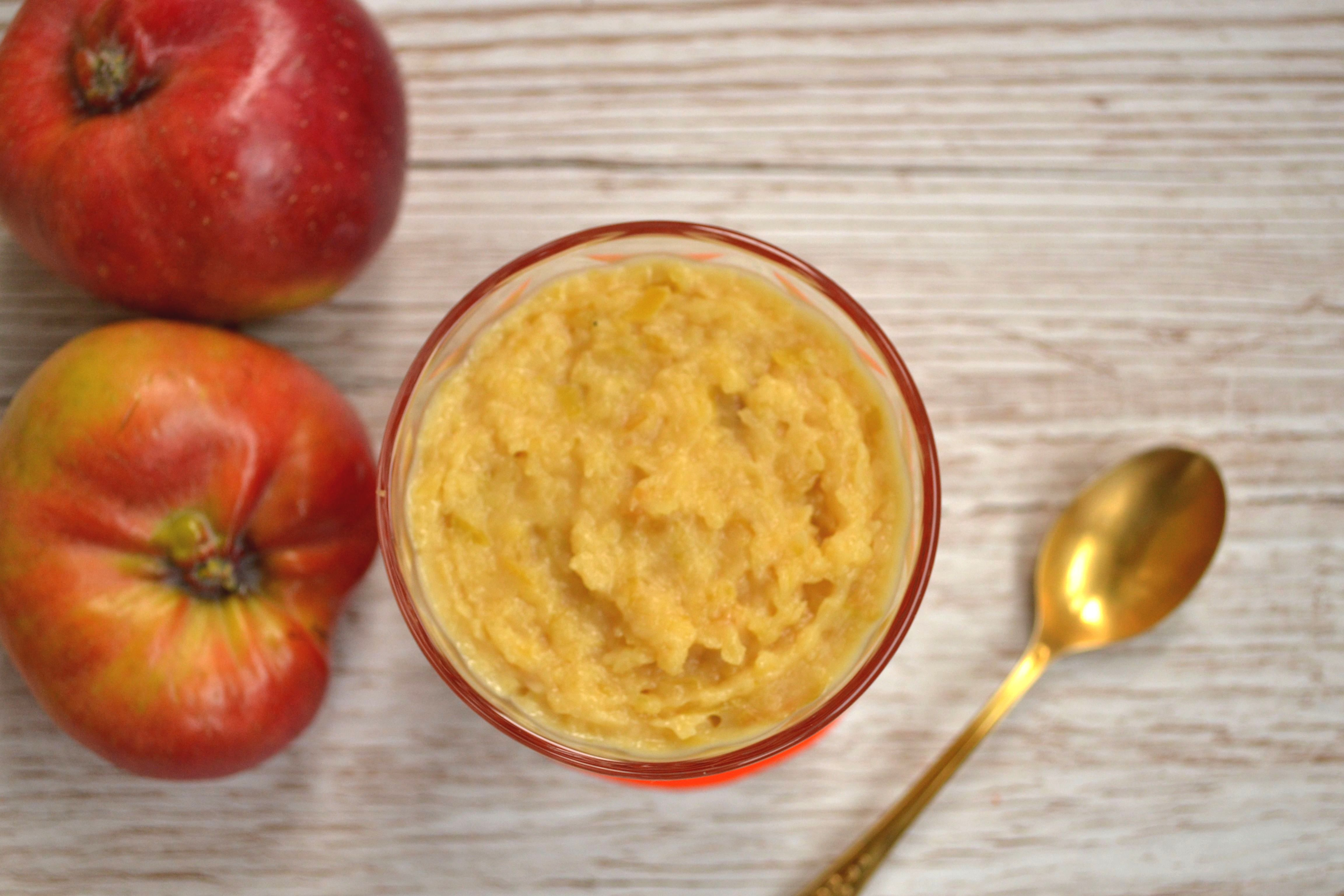
Yabchanka

Yabchanka (Ukrainian: ябчанка, яблучанка) is a cold Ukrainian apple dessert resembling mousse. It can also refer to a cold fruit soup.

== Ingredients and preparation ==
=== Mousse ===
Apples are baked in the oven (apple jam can be used), the pulp is pressed through a sieve, sugar and raw egg whites are added, and then whisked with a whisk until a thick white mass forms. After this, the mousse is placed in a mold and placed in a cool place (on ice) to cool. Sour cream mousse is also prepared by adding a little white wine or rum, mixing it with whipped cream or sour cream, and cooling.

=== Soup ===
The peeled apples are boiled in a small amount of water and strain through a colander or sieve. Water is added, and sugar to taste, and the mixture is brought to a simmer over low heat. 2 tablespoons of flour are whisked into half a liter of milk or a cup of sour cream, and a pinch of cinnamon and vanilla sugar are added. When the apples begin to boil, the milk (or sour cream) and flour are added, and brought to a boil while being stirred. The result is cooled down and served with cinnamon and croutons. Some recipes call for boiled beans instead of croutons.
