= Zoque =

Zoque may refer to:

- Zoque people, an indigenous people of Mexico
- Zoque languages, a group of languages of southern Mexico
- Selva Zoque, a rainforest in Mexico
- Zoque (dish), a dish of Andalusia
