= Avocado soup =

Soup with avocados as a primary ingredient

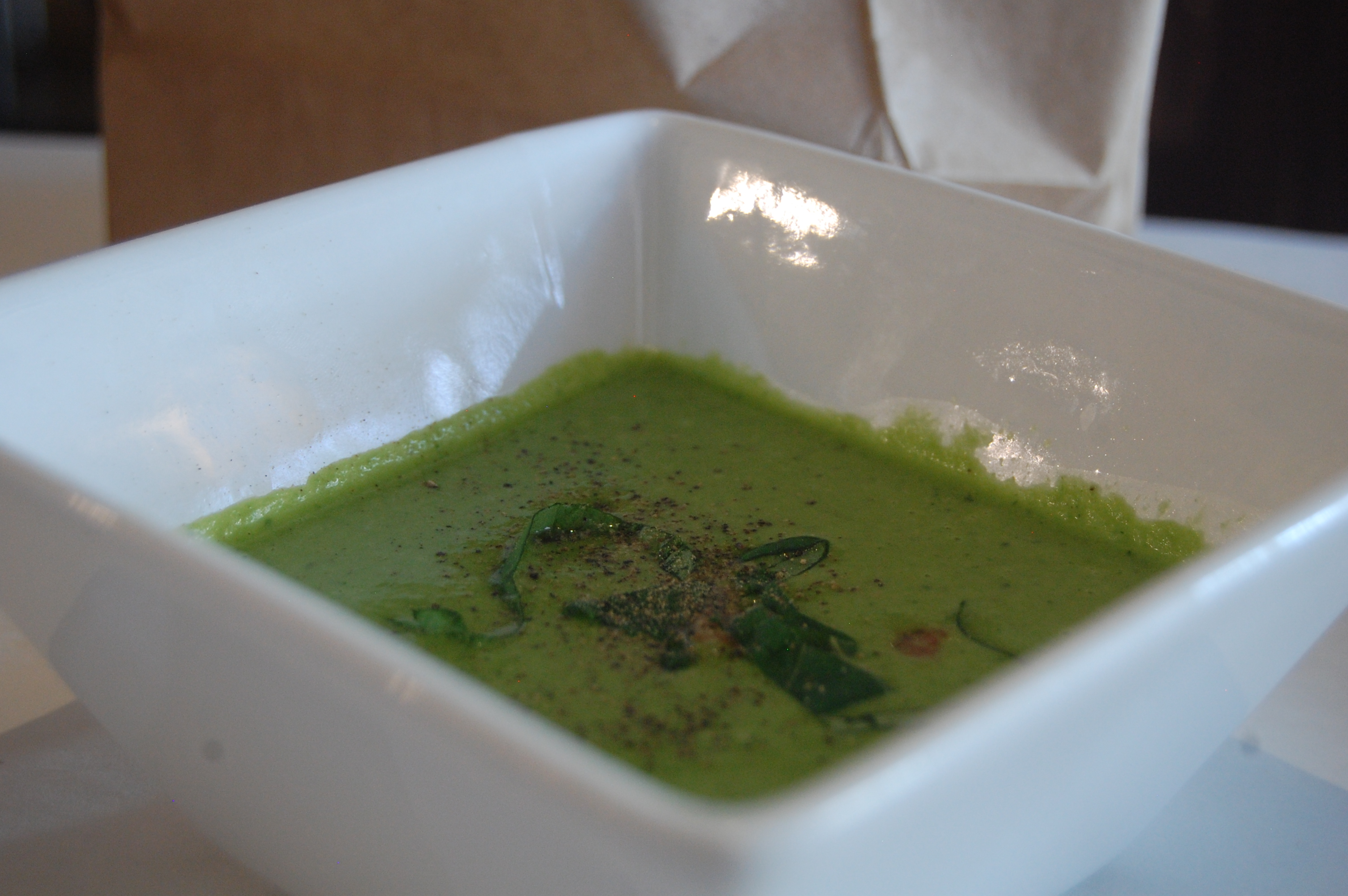
- Type: Fruit soup
- Place of origin: Unknown; likely Mexico
- Serving temperature: Hot or cold
- Main ingredients: Avocado
- Ingredients generally used: Milk, cream, stock, citrus juice

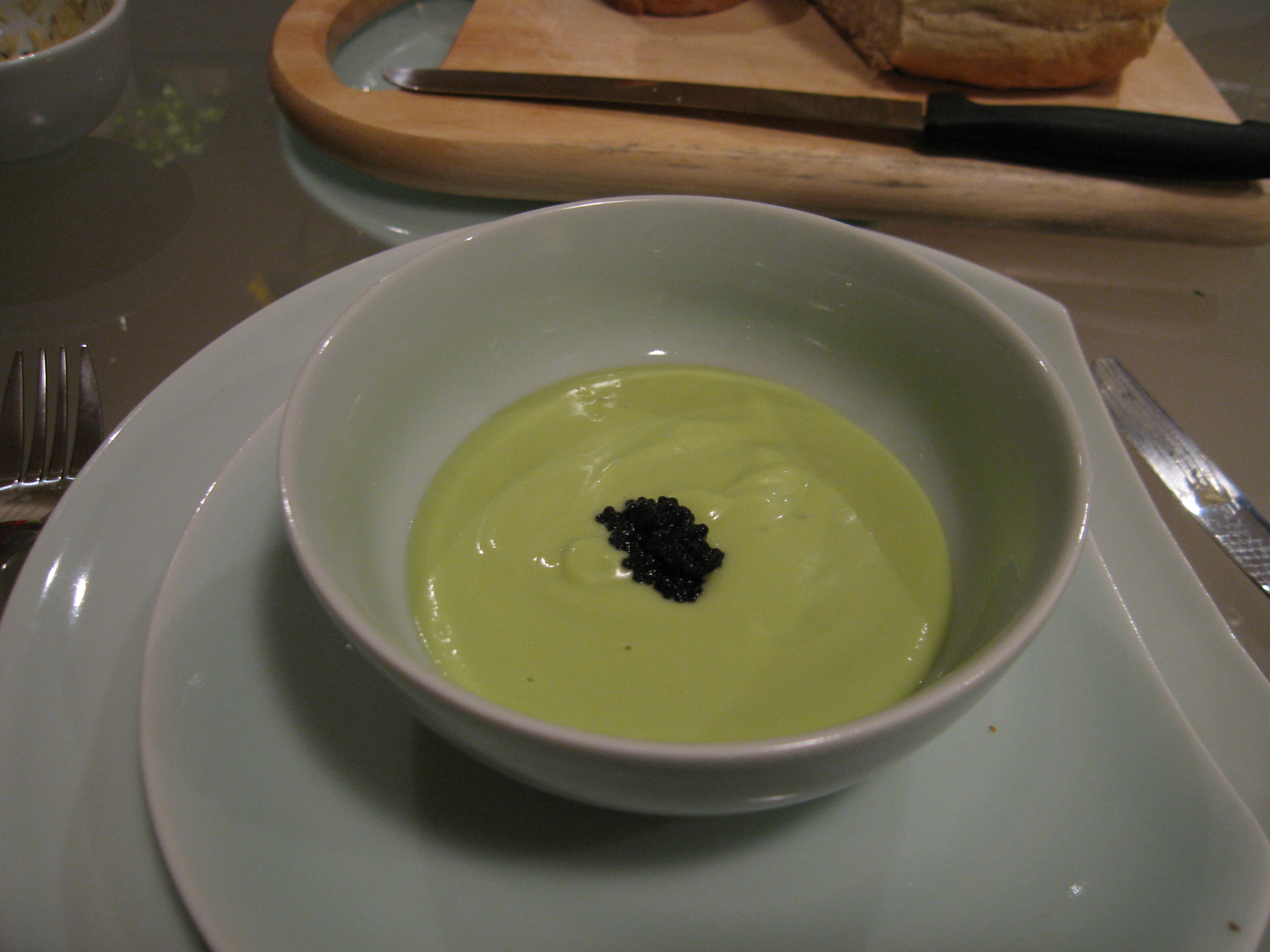
Avocado soup garnished with caviar

Avocado soup is a fruit soup prepared using avocados as a primary ingredient. Other ingredients can include milk, cream, or buttermilk; soup stock or broth; lime juice, lemon juice, and salt and pepper. Additional ingredients used can include onions, shallots, garlic, hot sauce, cilantro, red pepper, cayenne pepper, and cumin; water can be used to thin the soup. It is eaten widely in areas of Mexico.

The avocados in the soup itself are typically puréed or mashed; sliced, diced, or cubed avocado can be used as a garnish. Additional garnishes can include sliced lime, sour cream, chives, crab meat, shrimp, and salsa fresca. It can be prepared and served as a cold or hot soup.

Avocado soup's color can change as time passes because oxidation causes avocados to brown, but this does not affect the soup's flavor.

== See also ==
- Avocado § Culinary uses
- List of avocado dishes
- List of cold soups
- List of soups
