= Goddess and the Baker =

Restaurant chain in the United States

- Exterior of a location in Chicago, 2026

Restaurant information
- Website: goddessandthebaker.com

Goddess and the Baker is a restaurant chain in the United States. The business was established in 2015. In August 2025, the chain had five locations in Chicago and another in Brookfield, Wisconsin.

== Description ==
Chocolate chip cookie from Goddess and the Baker

Goddess and the Baker is a chain of fast-casual cafés. It has been described as an "offshoot" of Goddess and Grocer and as a woman-owned business. The menu includes coffee and espresso drinks, as well as avocado toasts, salads, sandwiches, pastries, and other breakfast options. Baked goods have included cookies, rice crispy treats, and sticky buns with pecans. Goddess and the Baker has also served gelato, rainbow cake, soups, beer, and wine.

== History ==
The business is co-owned by Tamar Mizrahi, Debbie Sharpe, and minority partner Michael Schultz. The business is cashless. It commemorates Pride with rainbow-colored foods. In addition to rainbow cake, the business has served rainbow lattes (since 2017) and designed a rainbow coffee blend in collaboration with Metric Coffee.

== Locations ==
The Wabash Avenue location in Chicago opened in 2015 and has a seating capacity of 41 people. The Brookfield location opened in 2018, marking the business' expansion into Wisconsin. The 2,000-square-foot Brookfield location was the chain's eighth.

Plans for the River North location on East Grand Avenue were announced in July 2019. The space previously housed the fine dining restaurant Baffo. The restaurant opened in late 2019. The chain had three locations in the Chicago Loop at the time. The Madison Street location in the Loop was also announced in 2019. In 2025, the business announced plans to open at Edens Plaza in Wilmette, Illinois.

Previously, the business operated at Chicago's Navy Pier.

== Reception ==
Sam Greszes included the business in Thrillist's 2021 list of Chicago's best bakeries. In 2024, Peter Chakerian, of Cleveland.com called the business a "hyper-local" chain with "some of the best fast-casual breakfast and lunch options around".

== See also ==
- List of bakeries
- List of restaurant chains in the United States
- List of restaurants in Chicago
