= Fruit soup =

Soup made primarily with fruit

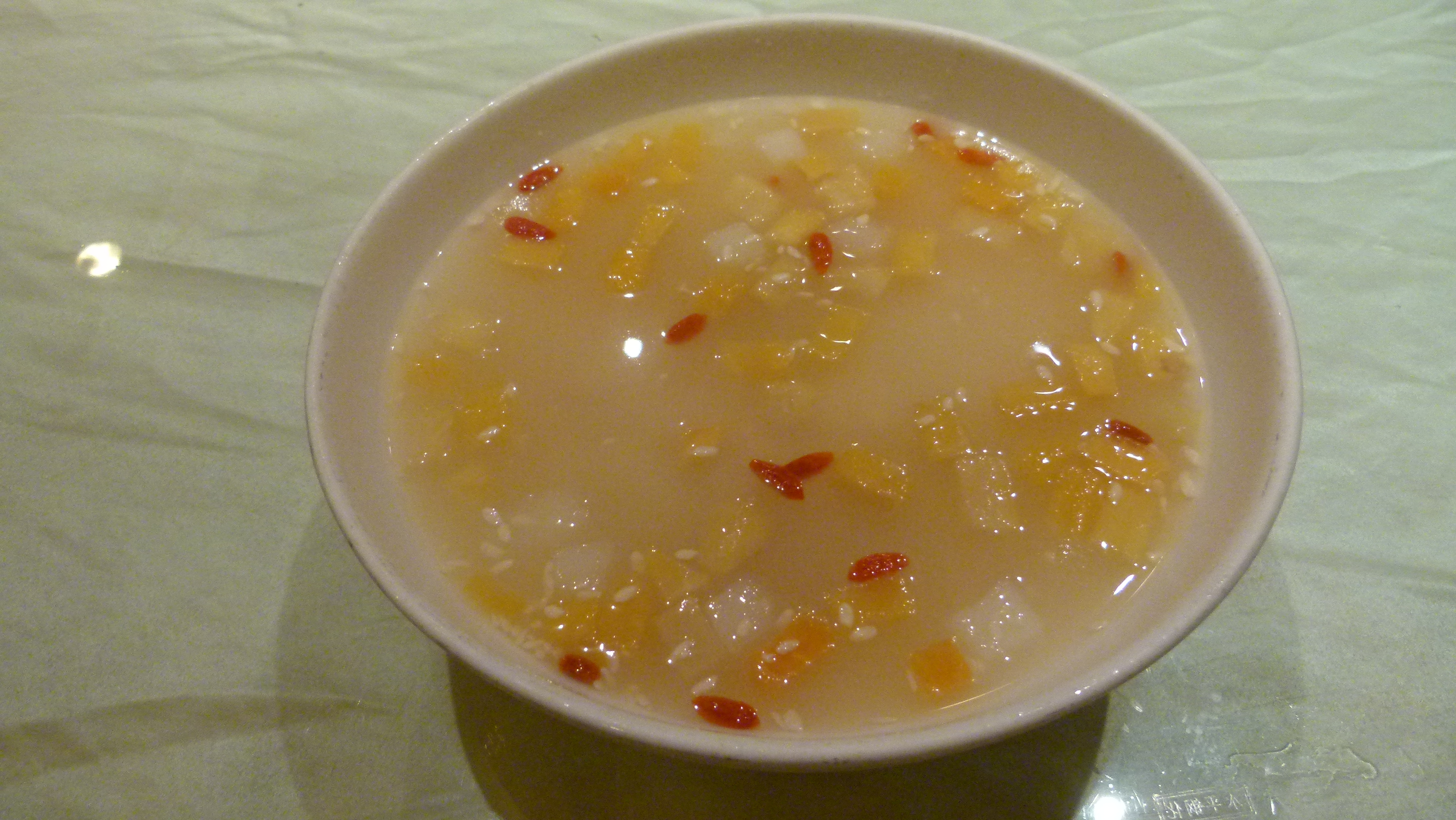
Chinese fruit soup

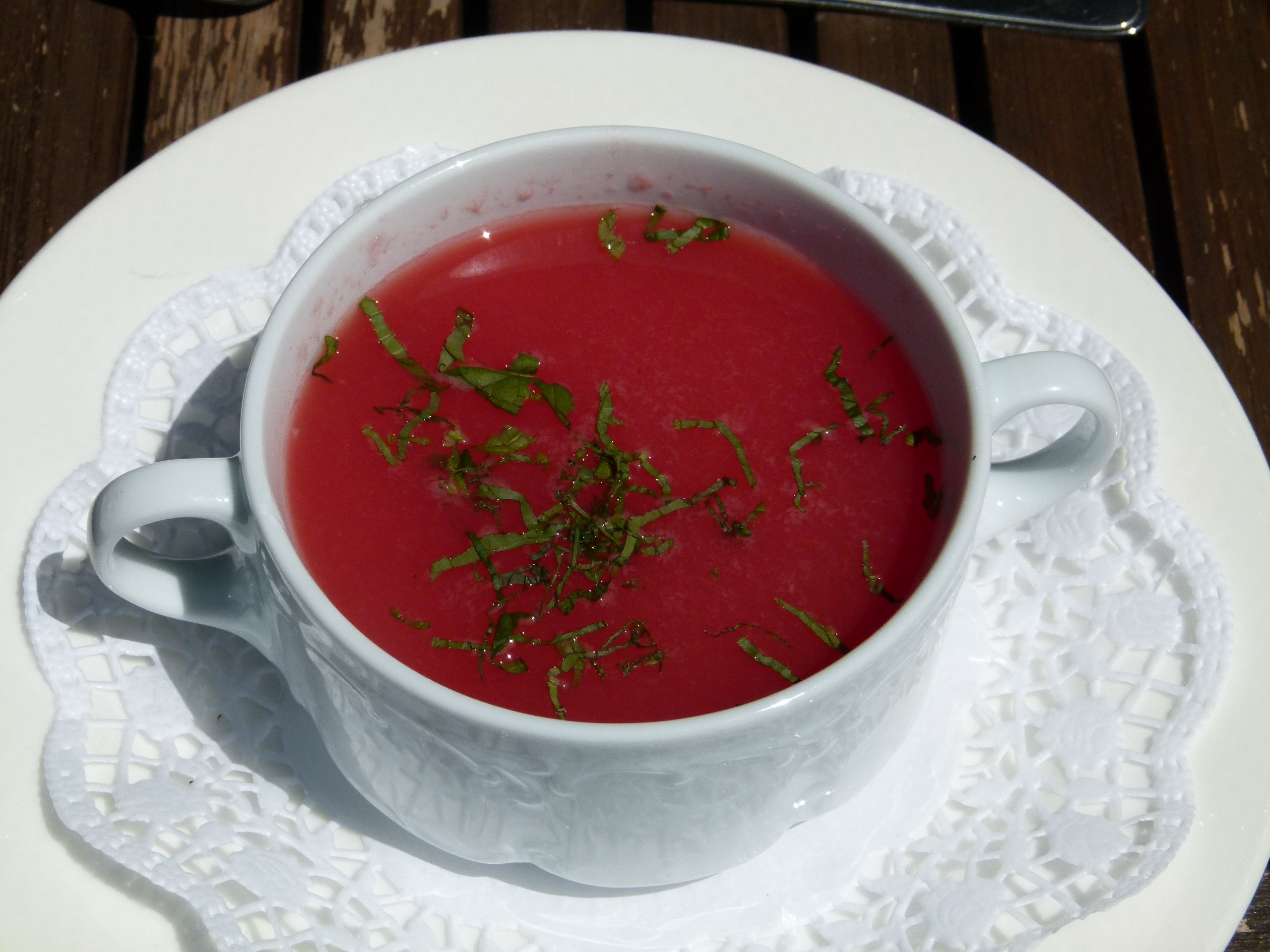
Melon soup

Fruit soup is a soup prepared using fruit as a primary ingredient, and may be served warm or cold depending on the recipe. Some fruit soups use several varieties of fruit, and alcoholic beverages such as rum, sherry and kirsch (a fruit brandy) may be used. Fruit soup is sometimes served as a dessert.

Many recipes are for cold soups served when fruit is in season during warm weather. Some, like Norwegian fruktsuppe, may be served warm or cold, and rely on dried fruit, such as dried prunes, apricots and raisins, thus being able to be prepared in any season. Fruit soups may include milk or cream, sweet or savoury dumplings, spices, or alcoholic beverages, such as sweet wine, white wine, brandy or champagne.

== Varieties ==
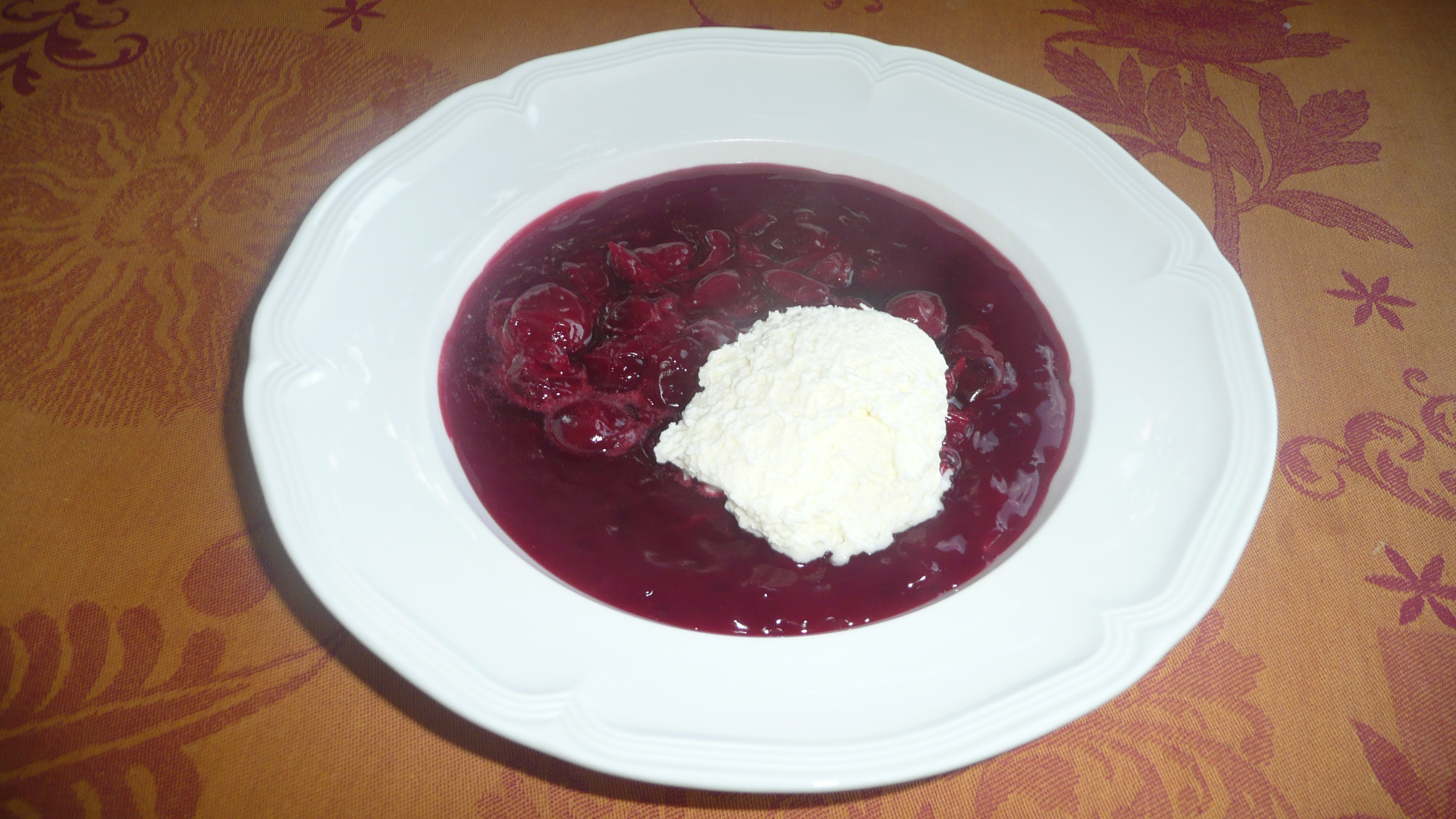
Sour cherry soup

Avocado soup is a fruit soup that can be prepared and served as a cold or hot dish.

Blåbärssoppa is a Swedish dish, that usually contains several kinds of berries (for example blueberries, bilberries, raspberries, strawberries and/or lingonberries), sugar, water and the optional cider or, less commonly, champagne. The berries, sugar and water are boiled together to make a soup, which is then allowed to cool. When the soup is cold, cider or champagne is added, making the soup fresher and slightly carbonated.

Coconut soup is a fruit soup that can be prepared using coconut milk and coconut fruit.

Sour cherry soup is a slightly sweet soup made with sour cream, sugar and whole fresh sour cherries, and served chilled. Originating in Hungarian cuisine, this soup is a summer tradition in several European cuisines. It may be prepared using wine or port wine.

Starch, particularly potato starch, may be used to thicken fruit soups, to make kissel, a viscous dessert fruit dish.

== By region and country ==
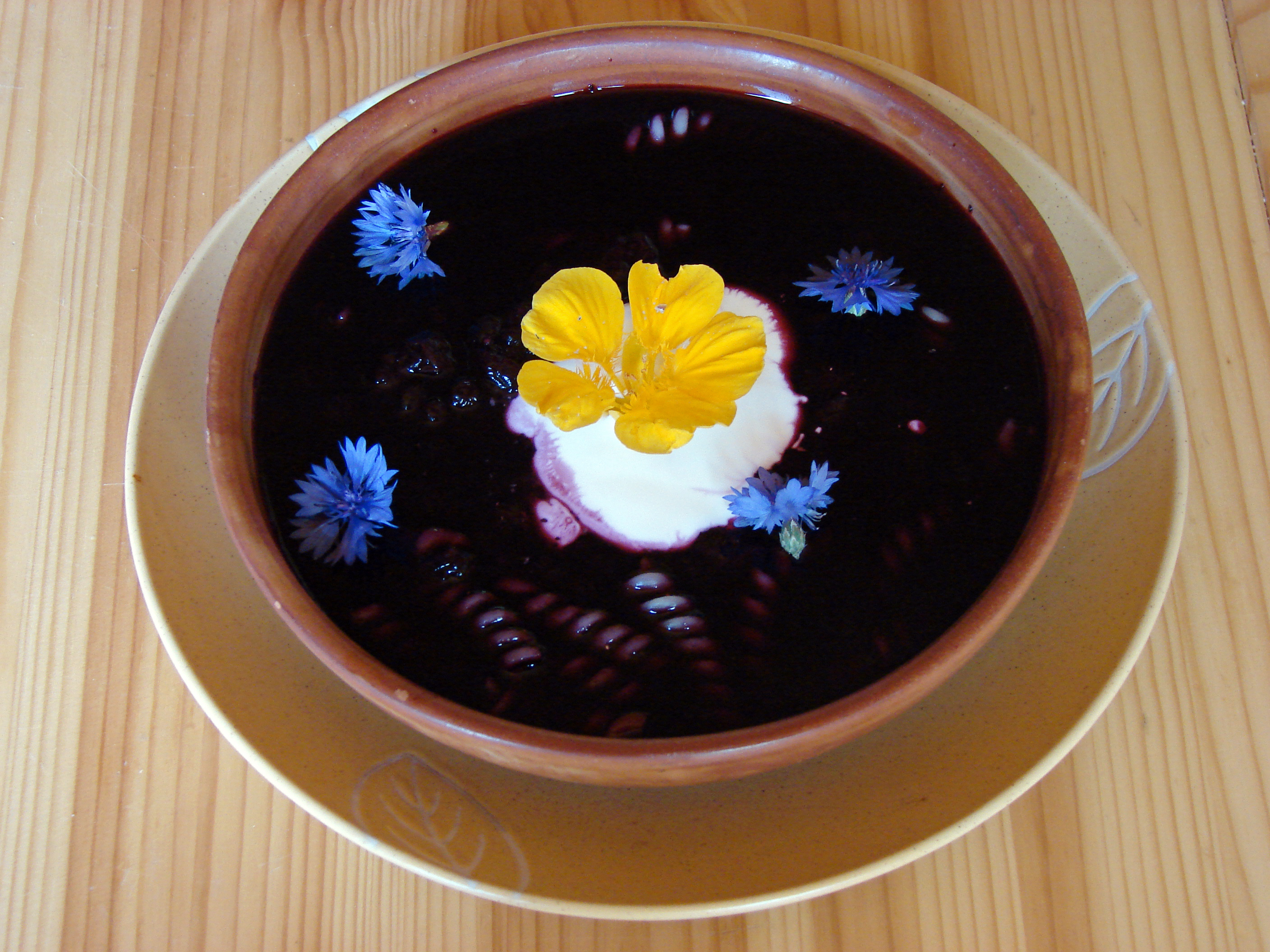
Blueberry soup

Cold and warm fruit soups are common in Baltic, Eastern European, Central European and Nordic cuisines (e.g. nyponsoppa, blåbärssoppa, kissel, hideg meggyleves and krentjebrij). Hot fruit soups appear in Middle Eastern, Central Asian and Chinese cuisines. Some fruit soups in these latter regions may also be served cold, and some may be prepared using meat as an ingredient.

=== China ===
Chilled mango soup and almond-fruit soup are dishes in Chinese cuisine. Almond-fruit soup may be served as a dessert.

=== Japan ===
Hungarian fruit soup has become a staple in Japanese cuisine.

=== Europe ===
Consumption of cold fruit soups is a tradition in the cuisine of Eastern Europe.

==== Nordic countries ====
Fruit soups are popular in Nordic countries.

Fruit soups have been described as traditional in Scandinavian countries. and are popular as a breakfast soup in this region during the winter. Swedish fruit soup is a food staple in Scandinavian countries, and has been prepared from dried fruit during winter months. Consumption of cold fruit soups is also a tradition in the cuisine of Scandinavia.

=== Middle East ===
Fruit soups have been described as traditional in the Middle East.

== See also ==
- List of cold soups
- List of soups
- Melon soup
- Pasta with strawberries
