= David Hicks (disambiguation) =

David Hicks (born 1975) is an Australian formerly detained at Guantanamo Bay.

David Hicks may also refer to:

- David Hicks (chaplain) (born 1942), US Army Chief of Chaplains
- David Hicks (rugby league) (born 1978), rugby league player
- David Hicks (ski jumper) (born 1945), American ski jumper
- David Hicks (basketball) (born 1988), American basketball player in Israel
- David Hicks (British designer) (1929–1998), British interior designer
- David Hicks (Australian interior designer)
- David L. Hicks (born 1963), American Anglican bishop
