= Childhood Domestic Violence Association =

US nonprofit organization

Childhood Domestic Violence Association, Inc.
- Founded: December 21, 2007
- Founder: Brian F. Martin
- Type: 501(c)(3) nonprofit organization
- Tax ID no.: 20-8258250
- Purpose: Domestic violence prevention
- Location: 1540 Broadway, 32nd Floor, New York, New York 10036, United States
- Region served: United States
- Method: Education and intervention programs
- Members: 3
- Key people: Brian Martin, _{President and Chief Executive} Sherry Orel, _{Board Member} Marilyn Martin, _{Board Member}
- Revenue: $322 (2013)
- Expenses: $10,301 (2013)
- Employees: 3
- Volunteers: 10
- Website: http://www.cdv.org
- Formerly called: Makers of Memories, Inc.

Childhood Domestic Violence Association is a nonprofit organization dedicated to help children of domestic violence. The organization was formerly named the Makers of Memories Foundation.

== History ==
The Makers of Memories Foundation was established in 2007 by marketing and media entrepreneur Brian F. Martin. Martin was raised in a family with chronic, serious abuse and created the Foundation to help families and children overcome the trauma of domestic violence they experienced and to pursue more positive possibilities in their lives. In 2007 and 2008 the Foundation hosted journeys for families which combined a restorative experience along with educational and therapeutic services. Financial author David Bach and the Central Park jogger, Trisha Mieli, participated in the intervention programs.

In 2011, the Foundation announced the launch of a national, comprehensive Action Plan with five elements: research, education, support services, intervention programs and shelter support. The Foundation continues to work with key leaders from the Department of Justice to ensure these challenges are faced with support from the government. The Foundation also partnered with the National Coalition Against Domestic Violence for the "Congressional Hearing on The Impact of Domestic Violence on Children" in October 2011 on Capitol Hill to educate American policy makers about the problem of domestic violence on children.

In late 2012 the organization was renamed "Childhood Domestic Violence Association" to better capture the message of the organization.

== Leadership ==
Brian F. Martin, founder, serves as chairman of the board of directors. Martin is the chairman and founder of Brand Connections. The advisory committee includes a number of leading domestic violence experts, including Jeffrey Edleson, Professor of Psychology at the University of Minnesota, Sandra Graham–Bermann, Professor of Psychology at the University of Michigan, and Renee McDonald, Associate Professor of Psychology at Southern Methodist University. The advisory committee also includes author and authority on leadership psychology Tony Robbins and Brand Connections CEO Sherry Orel.

Bill Livermore was appointed executive director in 2011.

== Programs ==
The Foundation's Action Plan includes initiatives related to the effects of domestic on children and also on adults who experienced domestic violence as children; intervention programs focused on building resiliency in affected children and adults and preventing vulnerable children from experiencing domestic violence; support services for affected children and adults; educational materials to raise awareness about the problem of childhood exposure to domestic violence; and material aid and support for domestic violence shelters. The foundation also speaks out against public policy that damages laws protecting the victims of domestic violence.

The Makers of Memories Foundation began production on a documentary film, 43 Million Secrets, in April 2011. The film profiles a family that has been devastated by domestic violence and includes interviews with experts in the field of domestic violence, law enforcement officials and adults and children who have experienced violence in their homes. The Foundation plans to use the film as an educational tool to inform the public about the effects of domestic violence on children, adults and society. Release of the film is scheduled for Spring 2012.

The Foundation convened a summit of scholars and interventionists in April 2010 in New York to identify the most promising existing intervention programs to help children impacted by domestic violence and to develop a new intervention program model focused on prevention. That research led to a partnership will partner with MINCAVA, of the University of Minnesota School of Social Work to launch a pilot program in 2012 that uses informal family protective networks to provide assistance and support to children who have experienced domestic violence and are at risk.

Congressman John Conyers, as the ranking member of the House Judiciary Committee, works with Makers of Memories and recently called for an oversight hearing to assess where the government is in their work on the impact of domestic violence on children, and what more can and should be done.

On January 16, 2012, Brian F. Martin appeared on the Dr. Phil TV show to discuss childhood exposure to domestic violence.

On October 1, 2012, Makers of Memories renamed itself as Childhood Domestic Violence Association to better convey the purpose of the purpose of the foundation.

On October 5, 2012, The documentary 43 Million Secrets was re-titled The Children Next Door, funded by the Childhood Domestic Violence Association, it was released on the independent film festival circuit where it won 25 awards from different festivals. It has been positively reviewed at Backstage.com, Seattle True Independent Film Festival 2013, and the Sundance Independent Film Blog.
