= Pasta with strawberries =

Polish dish

Makaron z truskawkami
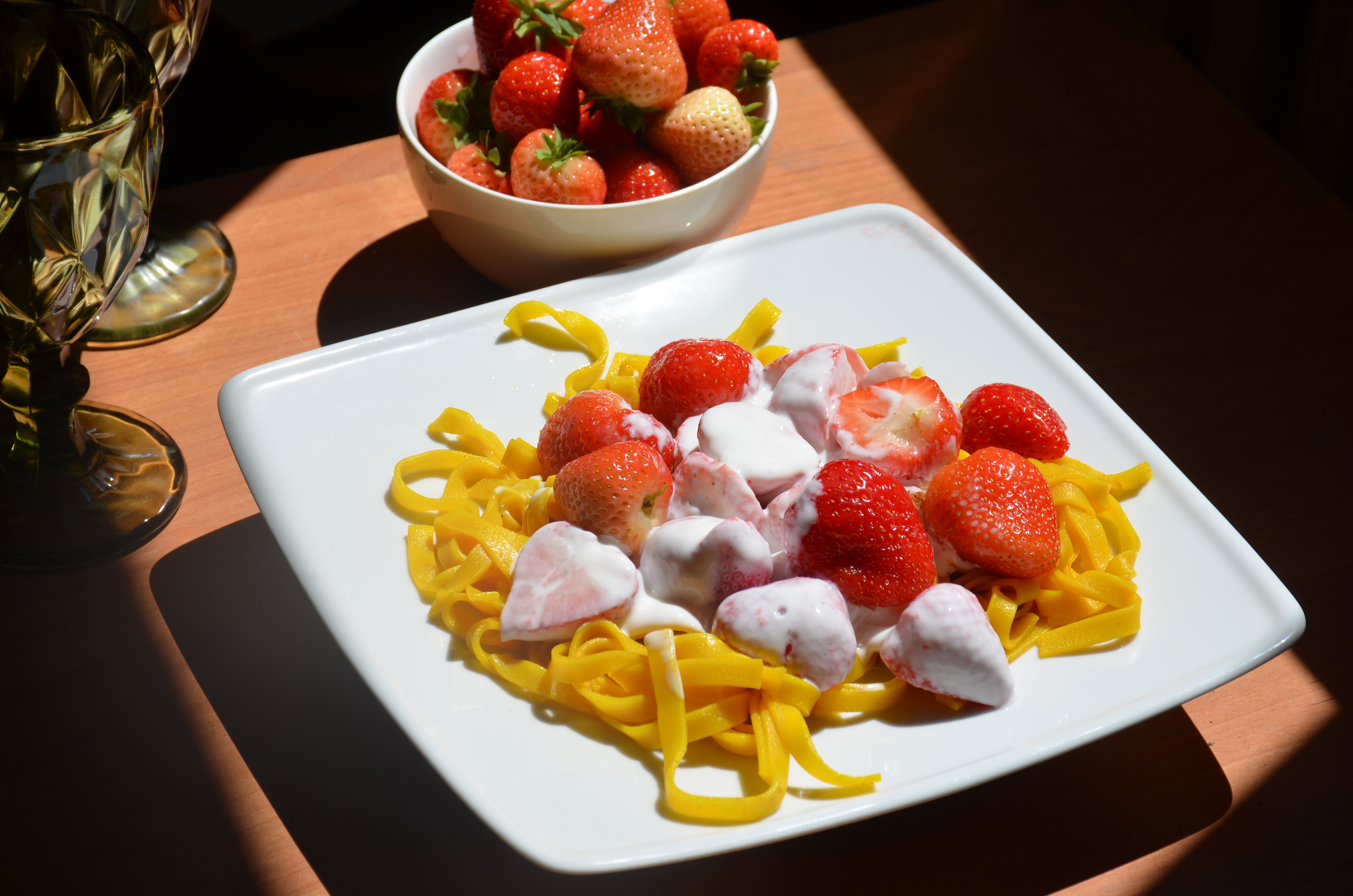
- Pasta with strawberries
- Type: Pasta
- Course: Main
- Associated cuisine: Polish cuisine
- Main ingredients: Strawberries, cream, pasta
- Ingredients generally used: Sugar

Makaron z truskawkami ("pasta with strawberries") is a dish from Polish cuisine. It is made by pouring a strawberry and cream sauce over cooked pasta. The dish may be eaten at lunch or as a dessert, and is often served in schools.

== Background ==
The origins of pasta with strawberries are unknown, but strawberries are popularly eaten with similar dishes in Poland. In Polish cuisine, strawberries may be added to rice and soups or stuffed into pierogi. Pasta with strawberries is commonly eaten in summer, as strawberry season lasts from May until July. During this time, strawberries are ripe and inexpensive. Kashubian strawberries are considered to be especially desirable for this dish, since they are reputed to have a high quality taste and aroma.

The dish may be served at lunchtime or as a dessert. In Poland, it is often eaten at home or served to children in school canteens.

In Polish culture, pasta with strawberries is often considered to be a nostalgic food associated with childhood. The dish received attention outside of Poland at Wimbledon 2025, when Polish tennis player, Iga Świątek, said that pasta with strawberries is one of her favourite meals.

== Preparation ==
The dish is prepared by crushing, blending or chopping fresh strawberries and combining them with cream. Sugar or honey may also be added to sweeten the sauce. The sauce is then poured over the top of cooked pasta and served. Pasta with strawberries may be prepared using other dairy ingredients such as creme fraiche, sour cream, yogurt, or heavy cream. The dish is sometimes garnished with mint leaves or sliced strawberries.

A variation of the dish called makaron z serem i z truskawkami ("pasta with cheese and strawberries") is made by adding twaróg, a type of white cheese.

== See also ==
- Fruit soup
- Comfort food
