= Avocado toast =

Toasted open sandwich with avocado

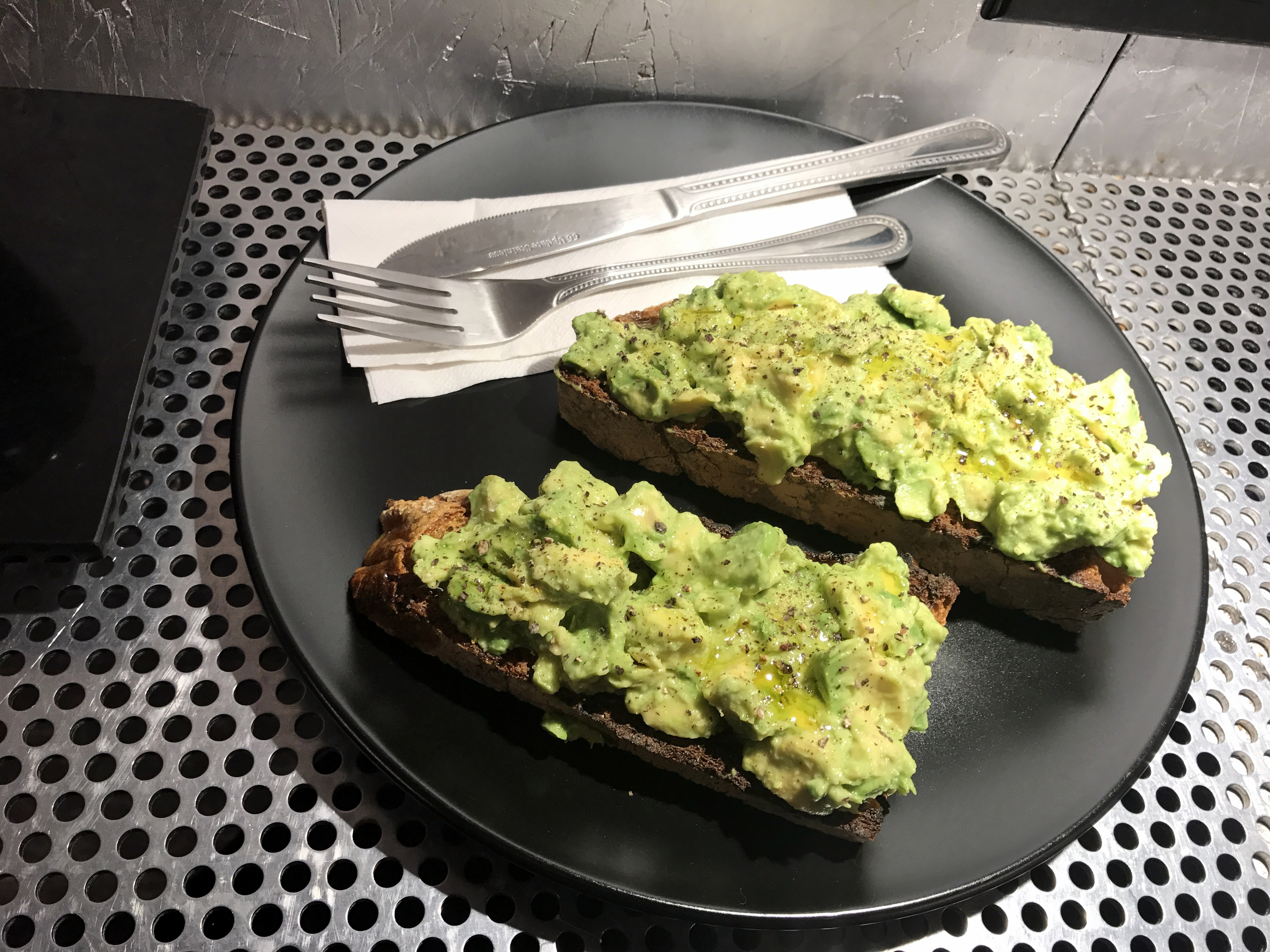
Avocado toast, with sourdough bread

Avocado toast is an open sandwich consisting of toasted bread topped with mashed avocado, plus any of a variety of spices and flavorful ingredients; the most popular include salt and black pepper, lemon juice, or other citrus flavors, olive oil, hummus, vinegar, red pepper, feta, duqqa, and tomato.

Avocado toast became a food trend in the 2010s; however, the preparation has appeared on café menus since at least the 1990s. There have been several debates about where the dish first appeared on menus. Following avocado toast's elevation to trend status, the act of ordering avocado toast at a café was criticized as a symbol of frivolous spending, along with the environmental impact of shipping the fruit from subtropical growing regions.

== Origins ==
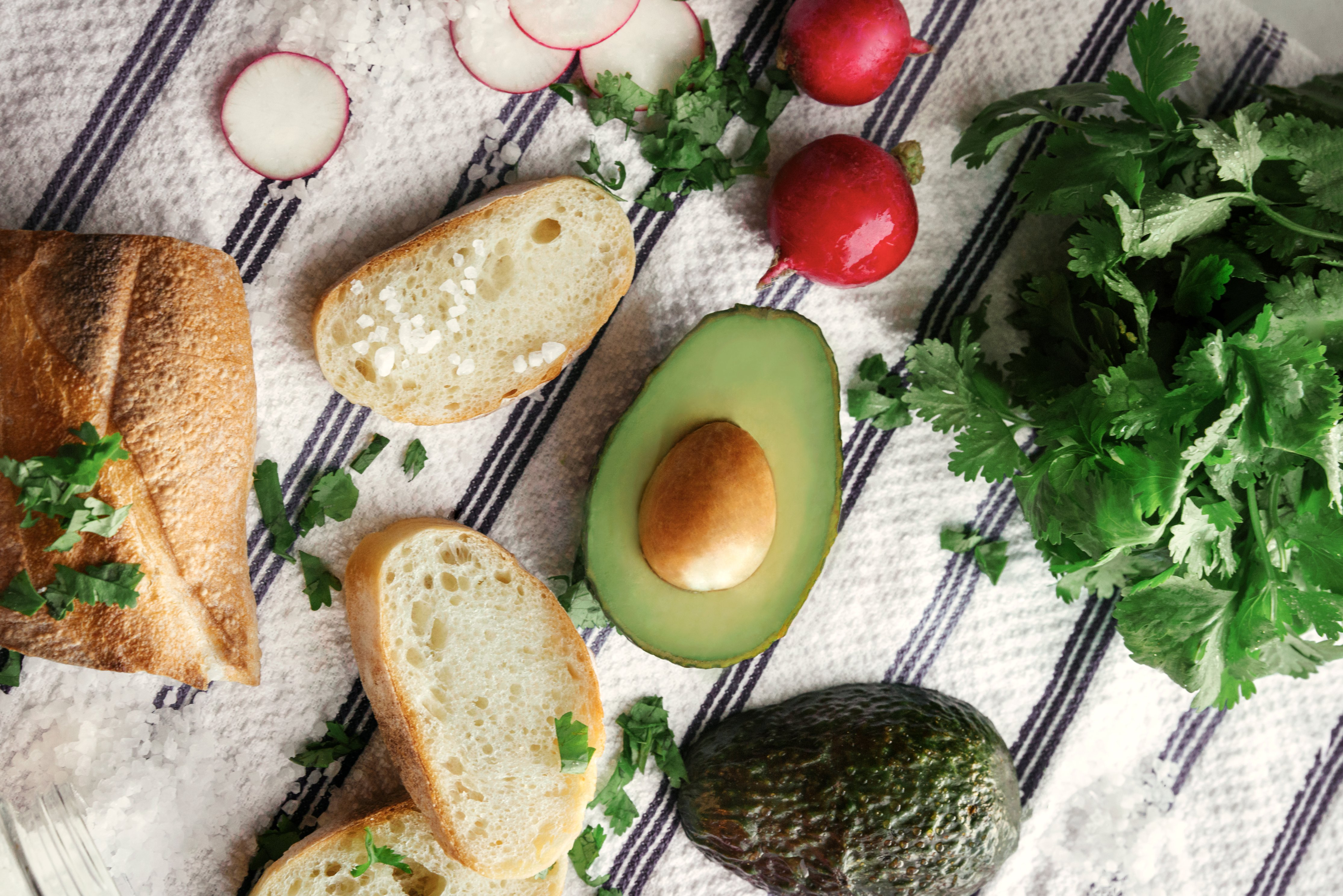
Ingredients for avocado toast

Avocados are grown around the world in tropical climates, historically in Mesoamerica and Northern South America. The trees and fruit have been cultivated by pre-Columbian civilizations from South Central Mexico for nearly 9,000 years.

Sliced or mashed avocado has been eaten on some sort of bread, flatbread, or tortilla (often heated or toasted) for centuries, before any documented or written history. In Chile, avocado on marraqueta or "pan con palta" or "tostadas con palta" is a common breakfast documented in a 1926 cookbook.

The consumption of avocados on bread or toast has been reported in various sources from the late 19th century onward; however, there has been debate over when the dish first appeared on menus. In the San Francisco Bay Area, people have been eating avocado toast since at least 1885. In 1915, the California Avocado Association described serving small squares of avocado toast as an appetizer. In an article published in The New Yorker on 1 May 1937, titled "Avocado, or the Future of Eating", the writer eats "avocado sandwich on whole wheat and a lime rickey." In 1962, an article in The New York Times showcased a "special" way to serve avocado as the filling of a toasted sandwich. According to The Washington Post, Australian self-taught cook, restaurateur and food writer Bill Granger may have been the first person to put avocado toast on a modern café menu in 1993 in Sydney, although the dish is documented in Brisbane, Australia, as early as 1929. In 1999, English food writer, journalist and broadcaster Nigel Slater published a recipe for an avocado "bruschetta" in The Guardian. The journalist and editor Lauren Oyler credited Cafe Gitane with bringing the dish to the United States in its "Instagrammable" form, as it grew as a food trend.

=== Variations ===
Variations include avocado on sweet potato toast, avocado and Vegemite toast, French toast with avocado and Parmesan, avocado toast fingers with soft-boiled eggs, and avocado and feta smash on toasted rye bread. Another common variation is toast with smashed avocados, soft-boiled egg, and other toppings, often including hot sauce.

== Modern day ==
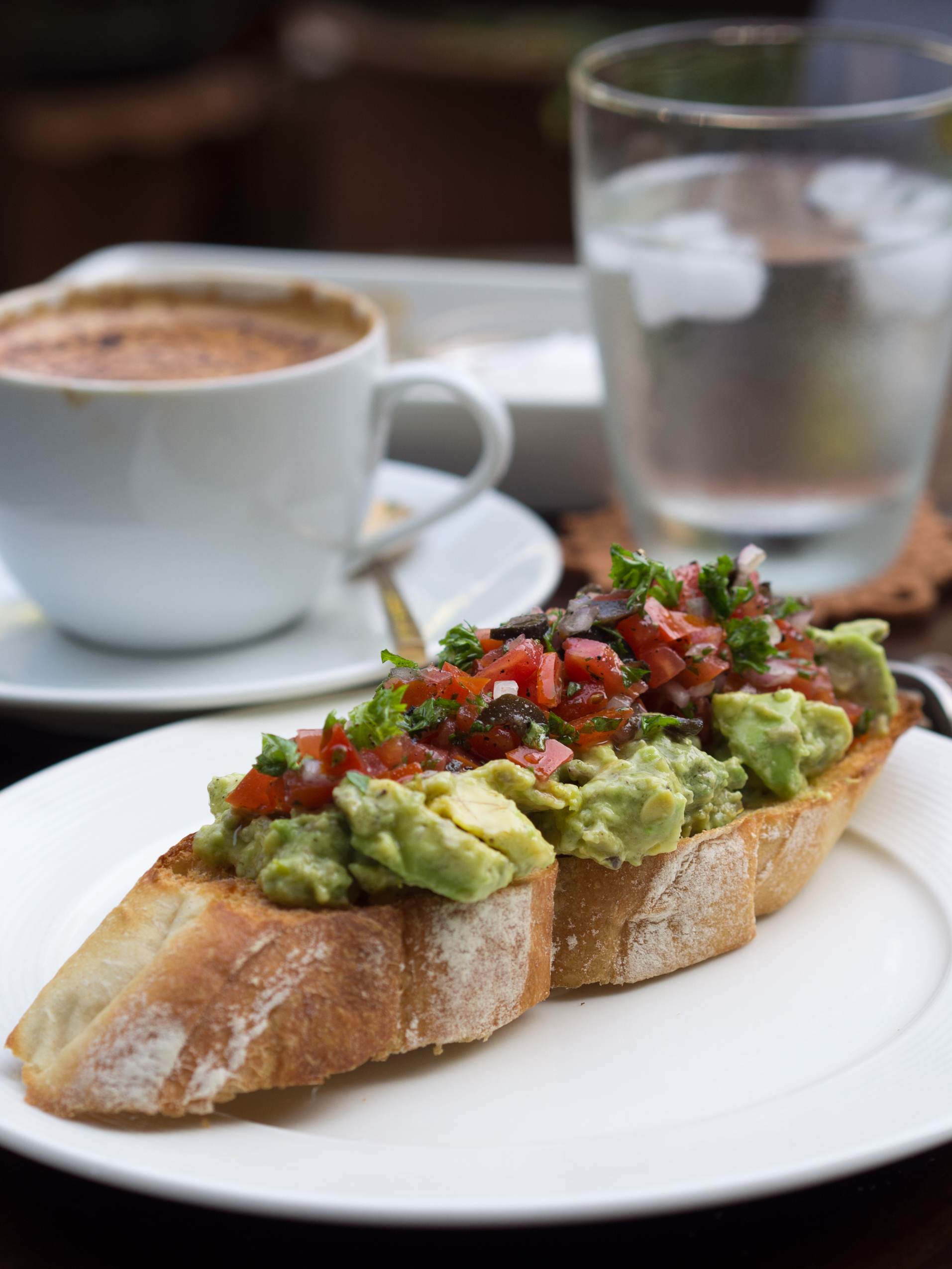
Avocado toast topped with tomato and olive salsa, served with a cup of coffee

Celebrities such as Gwyneth Paltrow have been credited with the popularization of avocado toast through her recipe book, It's All Good: Delicious, Easy Recipes That Will Make You Look Good and Feel Great (2013). The dish was popularized on social media, with many food bloggers recreating the dish. Bon Appétit magazine published a recipe for "Your New Avocado Toast" in its January 2015, and by 2016, the dish was being depicted on T-shirts, with The Washington Post calling it "more than just a meal – it's a meme".

Jayne Orenstein of The Washington Post reports, "avocado toast has come to define what makes food trends this decade: It's healthy and yet ever-so-slightly indulgent. It can be made vegan and gluten-free."

== Economy ==
Some writers argue that the dish's popularity overlaps with the clean living movement.

In Australia in late 2016, consumption of avocado smashed on toast became a target of criticism after columnist Bernard Salt in The Australian wrote an article about how "young people order smashed avocado with crumbled feta on five-grain toasted bread at $22 a pop and more", arguing that they should be saving to buy a house instead. (Salt later claimed that his piece was intended to humorously satirise the conservative attitudes of baby boomers.) The article made headlines internationally and became a stereotype of the millennial generation.

Millennials countered that they felt "a sense of futility" in saving for a house with the high cost of housing in Australia, and The Sydney Morning Herald calculated that a person saving $66 a week on brunch while property prices continued to rise year on year would only be able to afford a 10% house deposit in Hobart, with all other capital cities being unaffordable. Furthermore, cafés were said to have become the primary space for millennials to catch up with their friends.

In 2017, it was reported that the popularity of the dish had increased the price of avocados. In 2018, the consequent demand for avocados was said to have placed unprecedented pressure on the environment, leading some environmentally aware cafés to remove avocado toast from their menus.

Tim Gurner, a 35-year-old Australian property developer, stated in May 2017 that millennials should not be buying smashed avocado and $4 lattes in their pursuit of home ownership. In response to this, it was estimated that the savings of forgoing avocado on toast would be an estimated €500 annually, and that at this rate it would take over 500 years to save for a house in Ireland, at current market prices. This use of avocado toast has been likened to David Bach's "Latte Factor".

== See also ==
- List of avocado dishes
- List of toast dishes
