= List of cold soups =

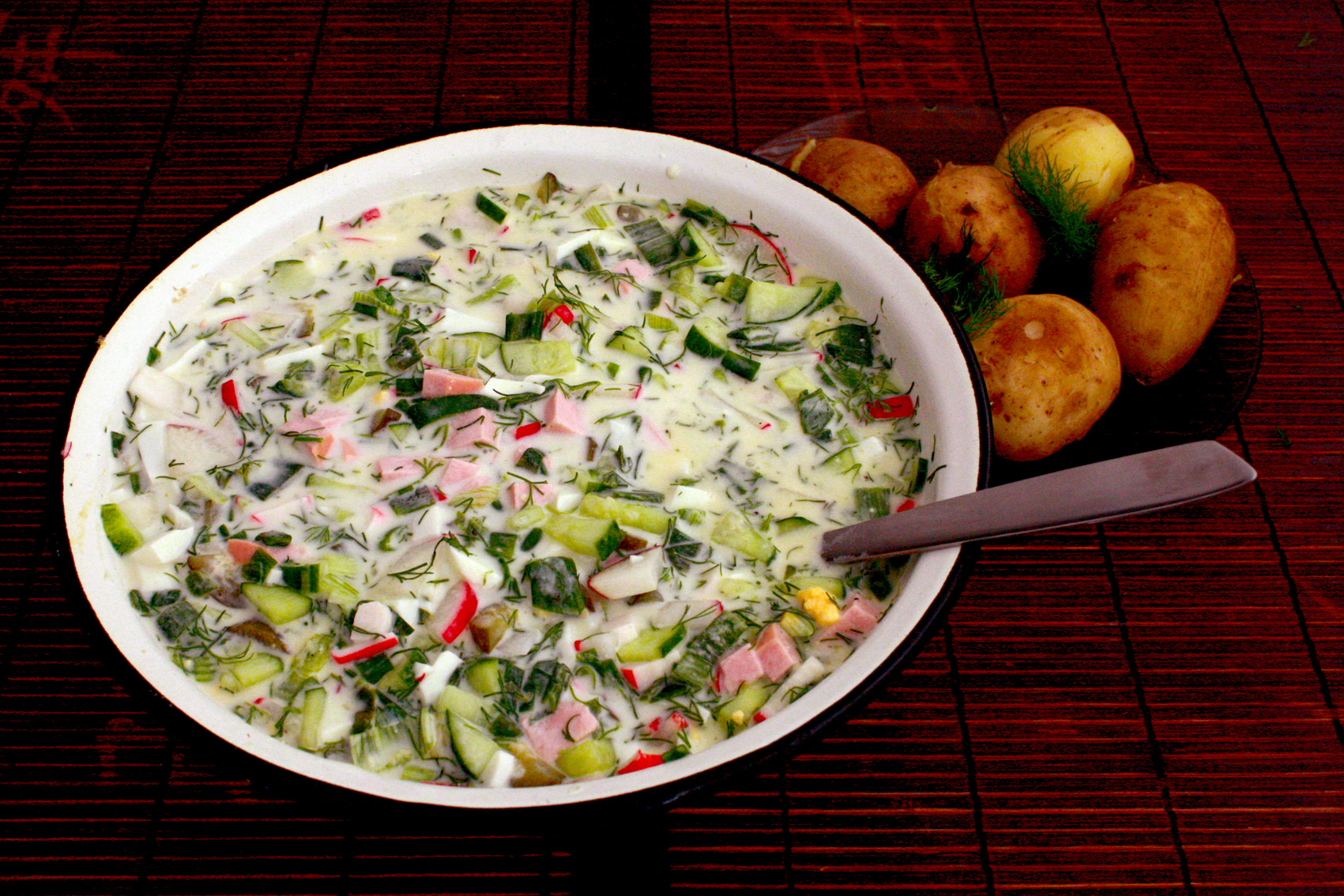
A bowl of okroshka soup

This is a list of notable cold soups. Soups have been made since ancient times. In warm climates, or in summer, many cultures make traditional cold soups. These soups tend to be lighter than winter soups and typically contain less fat and meat per serving. Some are purely vegetable based but many use light meat or fish stocks.

== Cold soups ==
Name	Image	Origin country	Summary description
Ajoblanco		Spain	Spanish cold soup typical from Granada and Málaga (Andalusia). It is also a common dish in Extremadura (Ajo Blanco Extremeño).^{[1]} This dish is made of bread, crushed almonds, garlic, water, olive oil, salt and sometimes vinegar
Avocado soup			Can be prepared and served as a cold or hot soup
Cold borscht		Slav and Baltic nations	Made from beetroot with optional onions, garlic, carrot, celery parsnip etc; with a base of sour cream, buttermilk, kefir, kvass, or yogurt. May be served with boiled potato or egg. National varieties include svekolnik, kholodnik, šaltibarščiai.
Fruit soup			Soup prepared using fruit as a primary ingredient. Pictured is Chinese fruit soup. Some fruit soups are also served warm or hot.
Gazpacho		Spain	In Andalusia, most gazpacho recipes typically include stale bread, tomato, cucumber, bell pepper, onion and garlic, olive oil, wine vinegar, water, and salt.
Naengmyeon		Korea	Cold noodle soup in cold meat broth
Naengguk		Korea	Refers to all kinds of cold guk (soups) in Korean cuisine, mainly eaten in summer. It is so called changuk, which literally means "cold soup" in pure Korean, while the term naengguk is a combination of a hanja word and a pure Korean word with the same meaning.
Okroshka		Russia	A mix of mostly raw vegetables (like cucumbers, radishes and spring onions), boiled potatoes, eggs, and a cooked meat such as beef, veal, sausages, or ham with kvass, which is a non-alcoholic (1.5% or less) beverage made from fermented black or rye bread.
Salmorejo		Spain	Salmorejo is a purée consisting of tomato and bread, originating from Cordoba in Andalucia, south Spain. It is made from tomatoes, bread, oil, garlic and vinegar. The purée is served cold and may be garnished with diced Spanish serrano ham and diced hard-boiled eggs.
Sorrel soup		Eastern Europe	Also known as shchav, green borscht or green shchi. The cold version is made from water, sorrel leaves, and salt. Varieties of the same soup include spinach, garden orache, chard, nettle, and occasionally dandelion, goutweed or ramsons, together with or instead of sorrel. It may include further ingredients such as egg yolks or whole eggs, potatoes, carrots, parsley root, and rice.
Swedish fruit soup		Sweden	Typically prepared using dried fruits, and typically served as a dessert dish. It may be served hot or cold.
Tarator		Bulgaria, North Macedonia, Serbia, Greece, Turkey, Balkans	Tarator, tarathor, taratur, or ttalattouri is a soup, appetizer, or sauce found in the cuisines of Eastern Europe. It generally includes ground walnuts, garlic, and yogurt or tahini, and often cucumber, herbs, and vinegar or lemon juice.
Vichyssoise		United States, France	Vichyssoise is a purée of leeks, onions, potatoes, cream and chicken stock. It is served cold.

== See also ==
- List of soups
