= Bill Granger =

Australian celebrity chef (1969–2023)

Bill Granger OAM
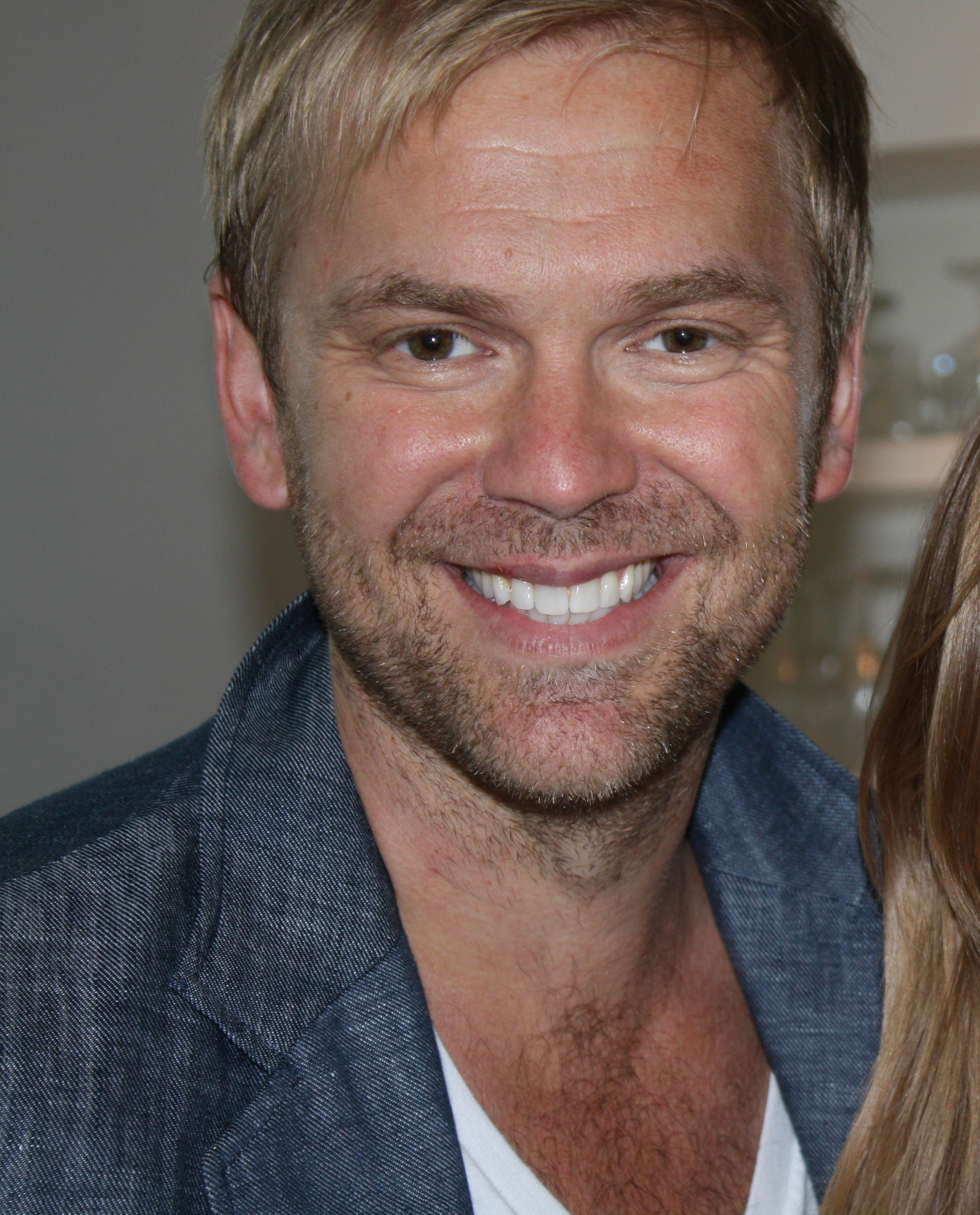
- Granger in 2010
- Born: William Granger; 29 August 1969; Mentone, Victoria, Australia
- Died: 25 December 2023 (aged 54); London, England
- Occupations: Cook; restaurateur; food writer
- Spouse: Natalie Elliot
- Website: bills.com.au

William Granger OAM (29 August 1969 – 25 December 2023) was an Australian self-taught cook, restaurateur and food writer. Based in Australia and London, he worked internationally.

== Career ==
In the late 1980s, Granger relocated from Melbourne to Sydney to study visual art. He worked as a waiter while he studied art. His interest moved from art to food. In 1993, he opened a restaurant called Bills in the Sydney suburb of Darlinghurst. Breakfast, and, more specifically, creamy scrambled eggs, brought Granger to the public's attention. A second restaurant, Bills Surry Hills, opened in 1996. Bills Woollahra was his third restaurant. Bills in Sydney is credited as the first restaurant to serve avocado toast, in 1993.

In 2008, he opened the first Bills restaurant outside Australia in Japan, where he had lived for half a year. Since then, he has opened eight restaurants in Japan, in regions such as Tokyo, Yokohama, Kamakura, Fukuoka and Osaka.

In 2011, Granger opened his first UK restaurant, Granger & Co, in London's Westbourne Grove. In the spring of 2014, Granger opened a second London-based Granger & Co in Clerkenwell. and a new Bills restaurant in Hawaii. In that same year, he also opened his first restaurant in Seoul, and had two restaurants in the country.

=== Books ===
Granger wrote Bill's Sydney Food (Murdoch Books, 2000) which included information about the food in his restaurants. Culinary landscape with 14 cookbooks. That book was followed by Bill's Food (2002), Bill's Open Kitchen (2003), Simply Bill (2005), Bill Granger Every Day (2006), Holiday (2009), Bill's Basics (2010), Bill's Everyday Asian (2011), Bill Granger Easy (2012), Bill Cooks for Kids (2012), Bill's Italian Food (2014) and Australian Food (2020).

=== Media work ===
In 2004, the six-part series, Bill's Food, followed Granger for a week. It was well received in Australia and subsequently screened on BBC2 in the United Kingdom in 2005, drawing an audience of 2 million. The series was repeated on BBC1 and was shown in 22 other countries. In June 2006, Granger appeared on GMTV to present a week-long barbecue special filmed in the South of France. A second series of Bill's Food was aired on various networks. In 2009 a seven-part television series, Bill's Holiday, was released featuring Granger's travels exploring the varying regions and produce of Australia.

Granger was featured on a fortnightly segment on ABC Radio 702 with Richard Glover. Each week he discussed a recipe.

In 2011, Bill Granger became The Independent on Sunday's weekly food columnist.

A ten-part television series bringing Granger's food to West London, Bill's Kitchen: Notting Hill, aired from June 2013 on BBC Lifestyle in Poland, South Africa, Asia, the Middle East, and the Nordic Region; on BBC HD in EMEA and LatAm; and on BBC Entertainment in Latin America.

== Personal life and death ==
Granger was born on 29 August 1969 in Mentone, Victoria, to a vegetarian mother and a father who worked as a butcher. He was married and had three daughters with his wife Natalie Elliot.

On 26 December 2023, Granger's family announced that he had died on Christmas Day at a London hospital, at age 54. He died from cancer after having been diagnosed many months previously.

== Recognition ==
In the 2023 Australia Day Honours, Granger was awarded the Medal of the Order of Australia (OAM) "for service to the tourism and hospitality sector".

== Bibliography ==
- Sydney Food (Murdoch Books, 2000) ISBN 0864119917
- Bills Food (Murdoch Books, 2002) ISBN 978-1740450850
- Open Kitchen (Murdoch Books, 2003) ISBN 978-1740452267
- Simply Bill (Murdoch Books, 2005) ISBN 1-74045-363-8
- Everyday (Murdoch Books, 2006) ISBN 1921259744
- Holiday (Murdoch Books, 2009) ISBN 978-1741965025
- Feed Me Now (Quadrille, 2009) ISBN 978-1-84400-706-6
- Bill's Basics (Quadrille, 2010) ISBN 978-1-84400-843-8
- Bill's Everyday Asian (Quadrille, 2011) ISBN 978-1-84400-978-7
- Bill Granger Easy (Collins, 2012) ISBN 978-0007478224
- Bill Cooks for Kids (Murdoch Books, 2012)ISBN 9781742668895
- Bill’s Italian Food (Collins, 2014) ISBN 978-0-00-750700-9
- Australian Food (Murdoch Books, 2020) ISBN 978-1911632962
