= Fruktsoppa =

Scandinavian fruit soup

Fruktsoppa (Swedish: fruktsoppa, Norwegian: søtsuppe or fruktsuppe) is a fruit soup that is typically prepared using dried fruits, and usually served as a dessert dish. The dish has been described as a "cold fruit pudding." It is a traditional dessert in Sweden and Norway. Historically, during the winter months in Scandinavian countries, fresh fruit was generally unavailable, so people used dried fruits for the preparation of various dishes, including fruktsoppa. The soup may be served hot or cold. The soup can be made with one fruit or with multiple fruits; a soup which is made with multiple fruits may be called blandad fruktsoppa, which is Swedish for "mixed fruit soup".

Fruktsoppa is a staple food in Scandinavian countries. Consumption of cold soups is also a tradition in the cuisine of Scandinavia. Fruktsoppa is also a traditional soup served during the Christmas holiday season. The dish is also sometimes served as part of a smörgåsbord. It may be served with cake, such as coffee cake.

== Ingredients and preparation ==
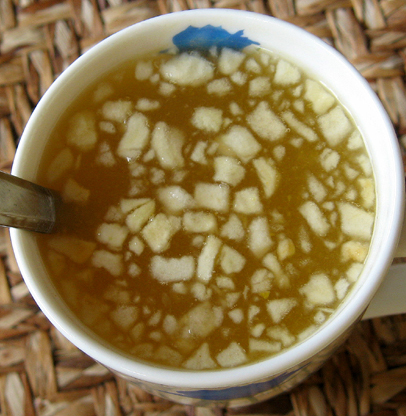
A thin, broth-like version of fruktsoppa (Swedish Varma Koppen)

Dried fruits used in the preparation of fruktsoppa may include apricots, apples, bilberries, pears, raisins, currants, cranberries, prunes, grapes, cherries, cloudberries, arctic raspberry and peaches. Additional ingredients may include tapioca, sago, red wine, sugar, lemon juice, cinnamon, and salt. Preparation involves soaking the dried fruits and various ingredients for some time to soften them, and then adding water and cooking the mixture until it thickens.

It may be served as a cold soup, and can be stored unrefrigerated for a "reasonable" amount of time. Its flavor may be enhanced by letting it sit for several hours prior to serving, which allows the flavors to better intermingle and incorporate into one another. Fruktsoppa may be prepared using a slow cooker.

In the United States, fruktsoppa has also been prepared and served both hot and cold before meals as a sauce.

== See also ==
- Rose hip soup
- Blåbärssoppa
- List of soups
- List of desserts
- Swedish cuisine
