= Blåbärssoppa =

Nordic soup made from bilberries

Blueberry soup
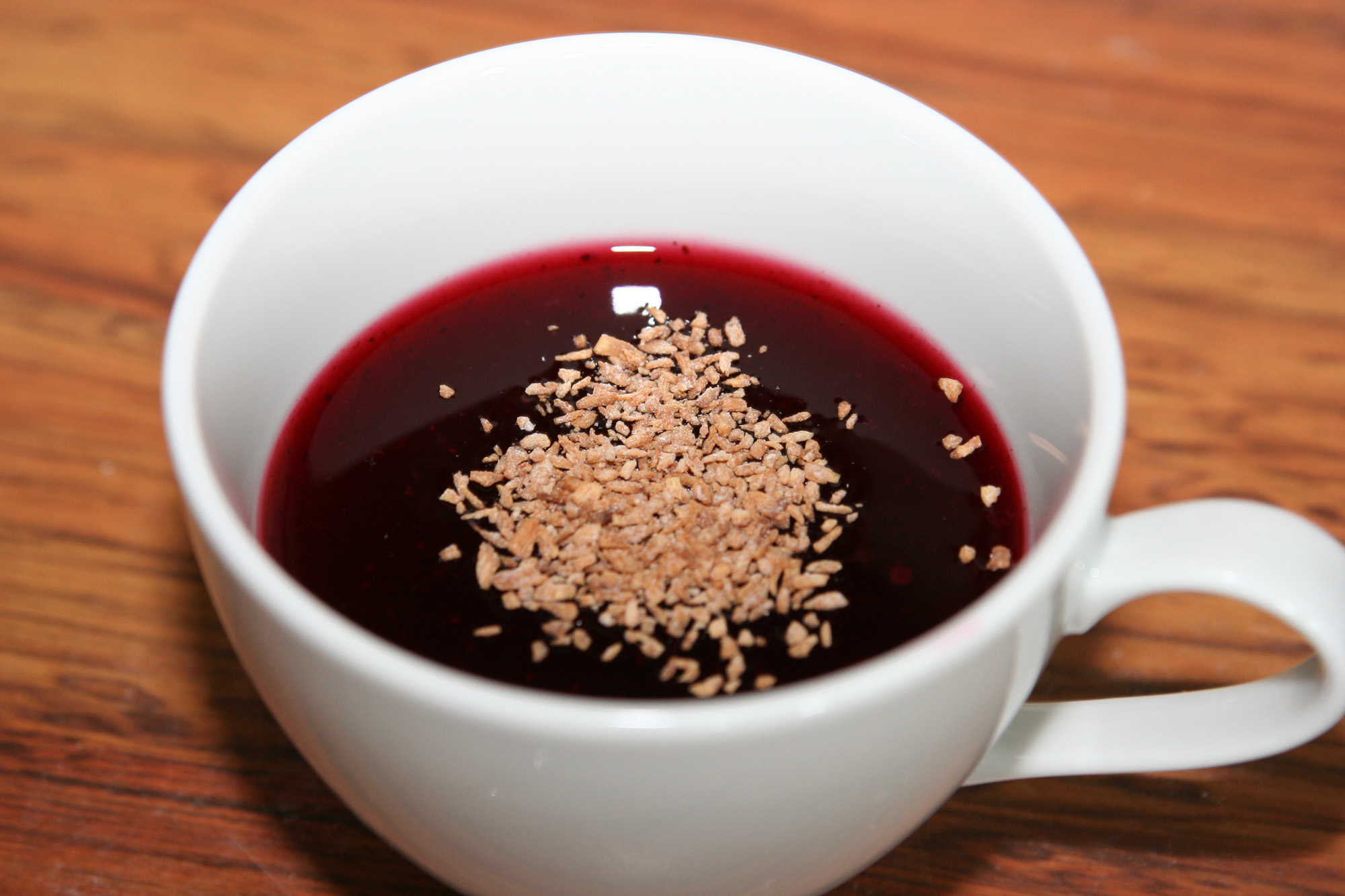
- Cup of blueberry soup
- Alternative names: Bilberry soup
- Type: Fruit soup
- Region or state: Nordics
- Associated cuisine: Swedish, Finnish, and Icelandic cuisine
- Serving temperature: Cold or hot
- Main ingredients: Bilberries, sugar, water, potato starch
- Similar dishes: Krentjebrij, kissel

Blåbärssoppa (Swedish lit. 'blueberry soup', Finnish: mustikkakeitto [ˈmustikːɑˌkei̯tːo], Icelandic: bláberjasúpa) is a Nordic fruit soup made from bilberries (European blueberries), which can be served cold or hot. It is sweet and contains starch, which gives it a fairly thick consistency. It is served either as soup or as a drink.

In the United States, Swedish blåbärssoppa is imported and sold under the trade name Blåbär. Blueberry soup can be home-made from bilberries, sugar, water and potato starch, or it can be bought ready-made or in powdered form to mix with water.

The Swedish word for bilberry, blåbär, literally means 'blueberry', but the beverage is not made from the North American blueberry (section Cyanococcus of the genus Vaccinium), but from the related but distinct European blueberry, Vaccinium myrtillus, which grows in the wild throughout Scandinavia and other parts of Europe.

== Uses ==
Blueberry soup is traditionally served to the participants at the ski marathon Vasaloppet, as it is rich in energy. Bilberries have traditionally been used to combat mild gastrointestinal ailments, and in Sweden and Finland, blueberry soup is often considered suitable food for people with an upset stomach, also because it is energy-rich.

== See also ==
- Rose hip soup, another Swedish fruit soup
- Fruktsoppa, a Swedish mixed-fruit soup
- Krentjebrij, a Dutch soup or porridge-like dessert with fruit juice
- Kissel, a jelly dessert or drink sometimes made of fruit
