= Krentjebrij =

Dutch soup or porridge-like dessert

- Type: Dessert
- Place of origin: Netherlands
- Region or state: Groningen
- Serving temperature: Warm or cold
- Main ingredients: Berry juices (redcurrant, blackcurrant or bilberry), water, pearl barley, sugar, honey, fruits and berries

Krentjebrij is a Dutch name for a traditional soup or porridge-like dessert with juice of fruit that is eaten either warm or cold. It is mainly popular in Groningen and Drenthe. It is also known as watergruwel or krintsjebrij in Friesland. While there is no exact English translation for the word "krentjebrij", it could be called "raisin porridge", "berry soup", or "berry gruel", or a literal translation could be "currants cooked to mush". A commercially available product called Bessola is made in the Netherlands.

Common ingredients include:

- water
- hulled winter barley (barley groats or hulled and polished winter barley (pearl barley)
- redcurrant, blackcurrant or bilberry juice
- currants, raisins, apple, cherries, berries, and other fruits
- sugar, honey, or cherry Jell-O powder
- lemon, salt, vinegar, and possibly cinnamon

== See also ==
- Blåbärssoppa, a Nordic fruit soup
- List of desserts
- List of porridges
