= Rose hip soup =

Swedish soup made from rose hips

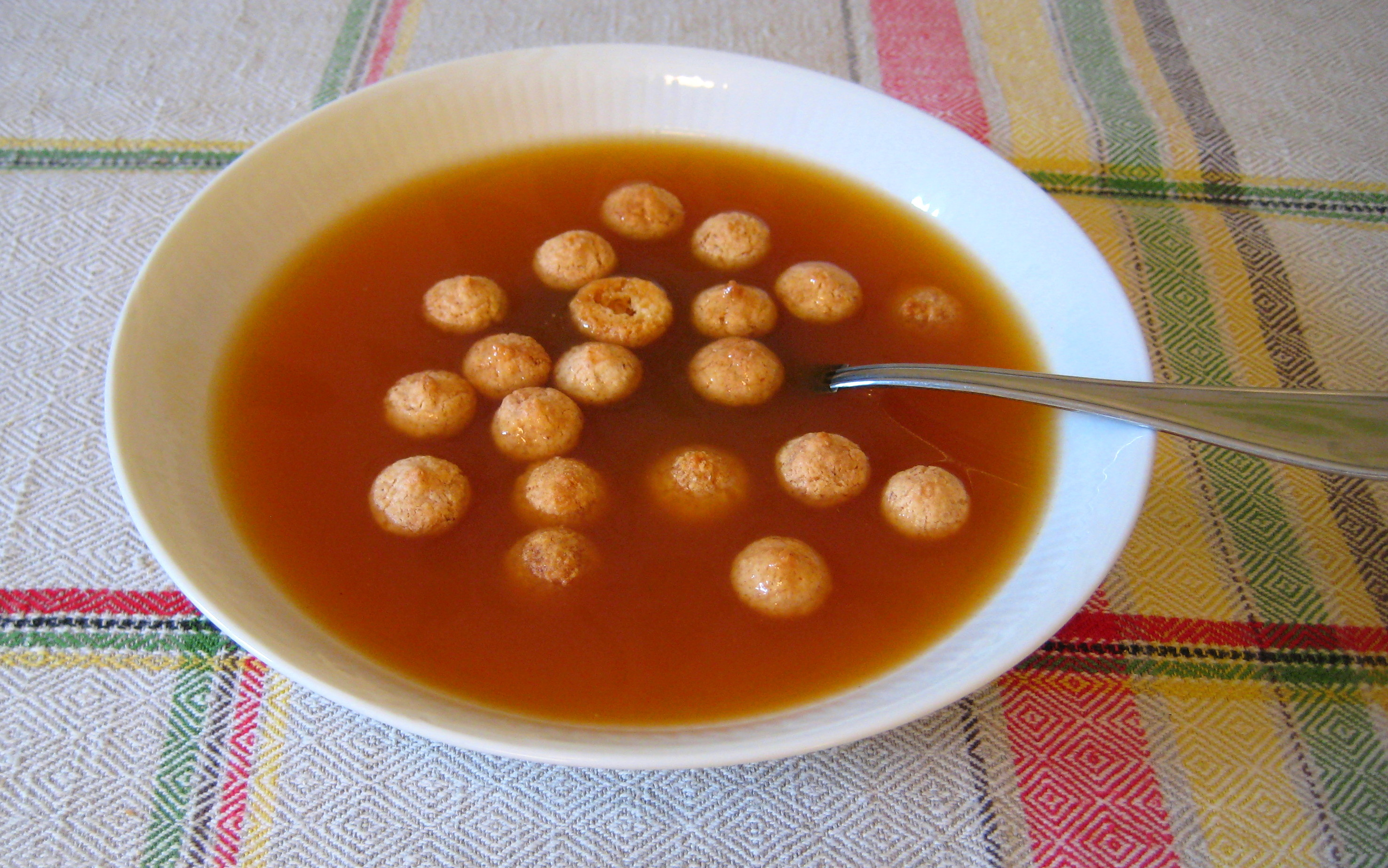
- A bowl of rose hip soup with small biscuits made from almonds, sugar, and egg whites.
- Alternative names: Nyponsoppa
- Type: Beverage or soup
- Course: Breakfast or dessert
- Place of origin: Sweden
- Serving temperature: Cold or hot
- Main ingredients: Rose hips, sugar, water, potato starch
- Food energy (per serving): 83–1,608 kJ per 100g 20–384 kcal per 100g

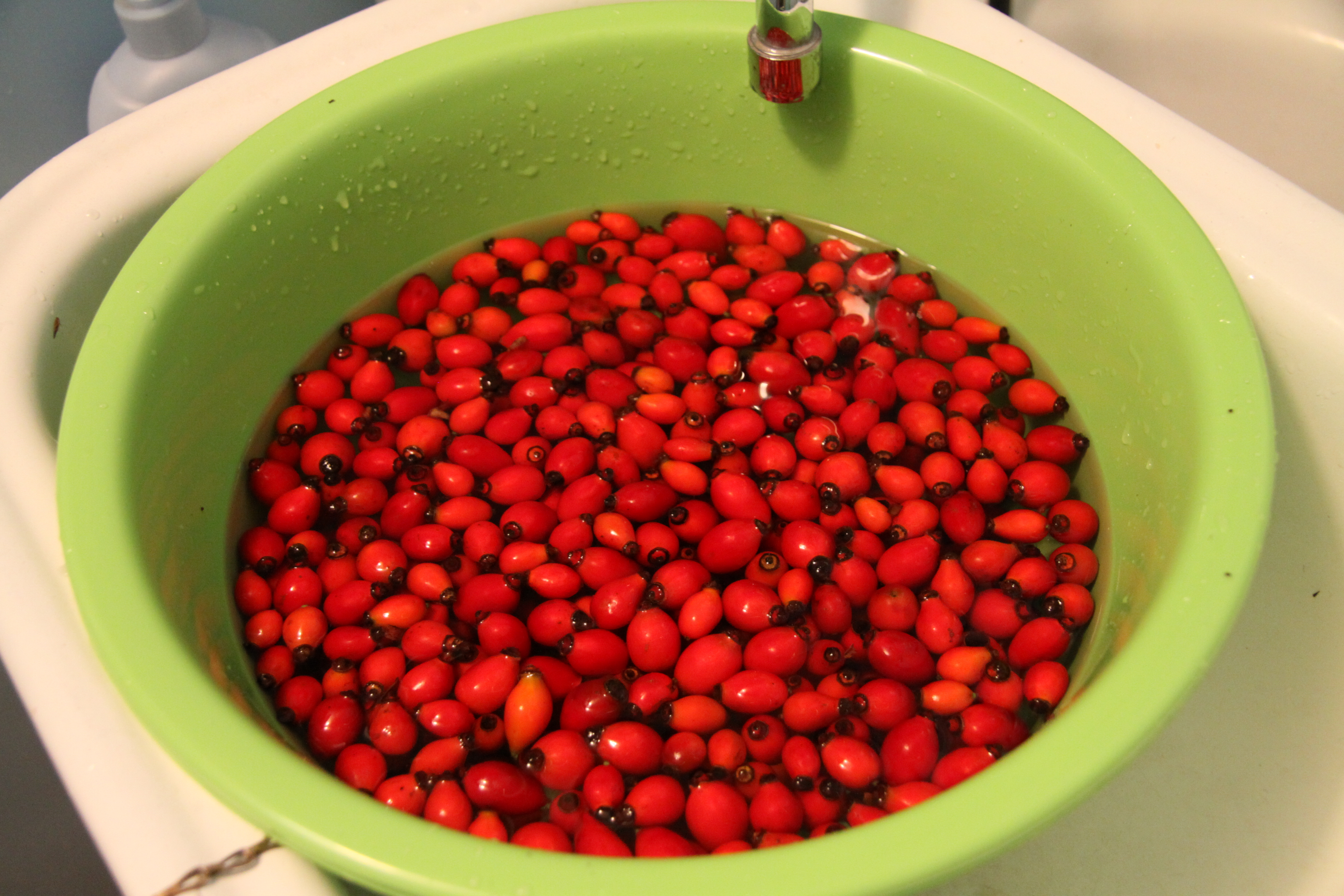
Rose hips

Rose hip soup (Swedish: nyponsoppa) is a Swedish soup made from rose hips. It is served as a beverage or as a dessert with milk, cream or vanilla ice cream along with small almond biscuits.

Rose hip soup may be eaten for breakfast. The types of soup for that purpose are generally lower in fruit content and more watery, and may be served with pieces of crisp bread.

== Description and preparation ==
The best rose hips, or nypon, to make the soup are the large hips of Rosa rugosa, but the smaller hips of Rosa canina and Rosa dumalis are also commonly used. The hips form after the rose petals have fallen off. They are picked after the first frost of the fall, once ripe and red, then dried. Nyponsoppa is typically made with dried rose hips, water, potato starch (as a thickener), and sugar. The rose hips are boiled until they are soft and then blended with a mixer. The mixture is then run through a sieve and thickened with potato starch. Rose hips are rich in vitamin C.

== See also ==
- List of desserts
- List of soups
- Fruktsoppa, a Swedish mixed-fruit soup
- Blåbärssoppa, a Swedish soup made from bilberries
