= Zoque (dish) =

Andalusian cold soup

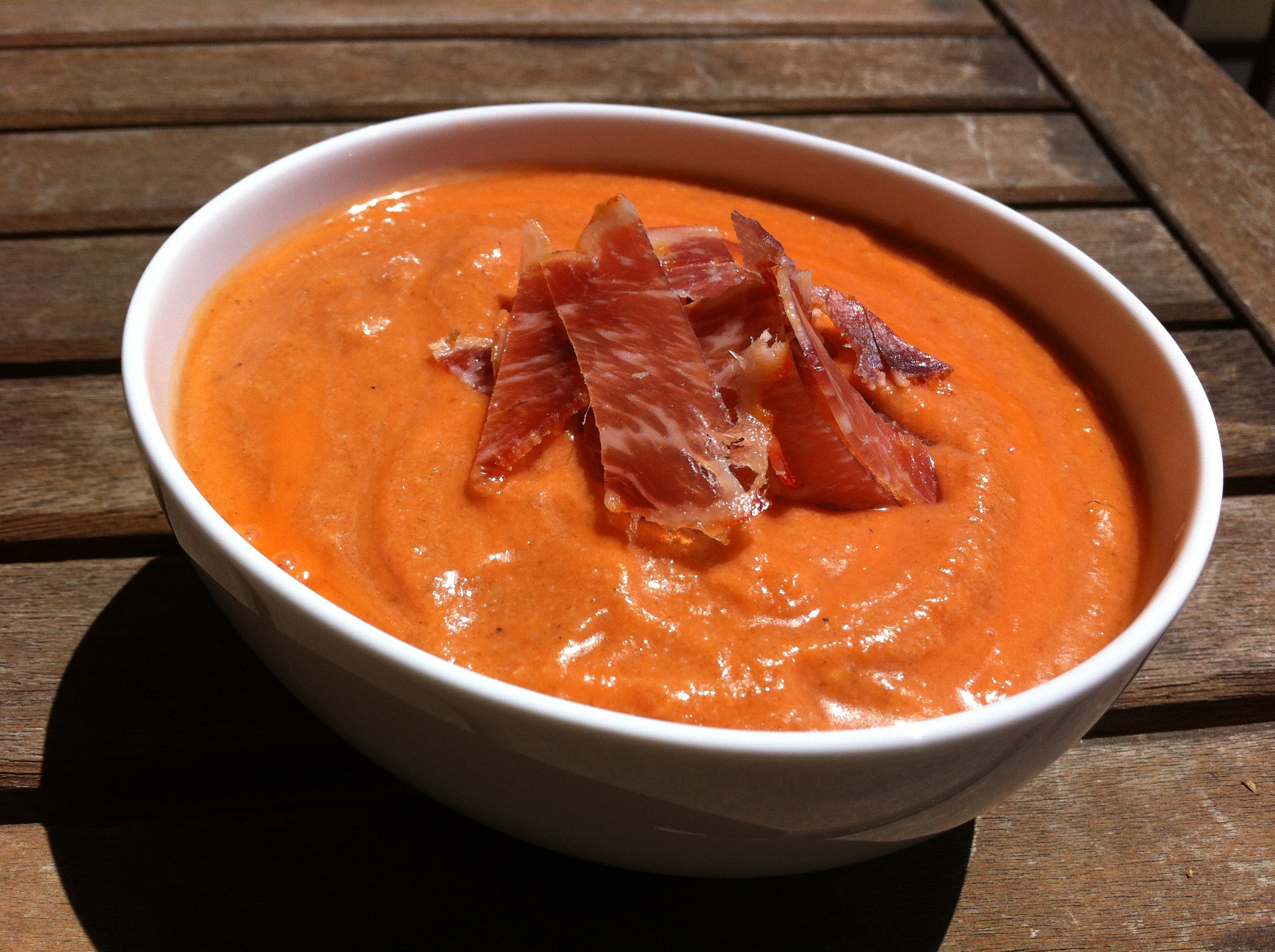
Cordoban salmorejo

Zoque is a variant of the popular salmorejo soup in Málaga. It is a cold soup that has vegetables such as tomatoes, red pepper, and carrot, as its main ingredients. It has a thicker texture than both salmorejo and gazpacho. It is usually served cold, with ham or shrimp.

== Preparation and characteristics ==
One feature of this soup is its creamy texture. The word zoque has its origins in the Arabic word, suqat, meaning waste or worthless item, indicating the use made of stale bread as one of its ingredients. It is customary to serve zoque with grapes.
