= David Hicks (Australian interior designer) =

Australian Interior Designer

David Hicks (born 1974) is an Australian interior designer and author, and the founder of David Hicks design.

== Early life and education ==
David Hicks was born in Australia but as an infant relocated to Kuala Lumpur, Malaysia, with his family where he lived until he was nine years old.

Hicks attributes his mother's approach to eclectically decorating their Malaysian home for his formative interest in art, design and decoration.

With early ambitions to pursue a career in architecture, it was upon completing his schooling in Australia, that Hicks enrolled in a Bachelor of Arts in Interior Design at RMIT from which he graduated with honours.

== Career ==
Having worked for a number of leading Australian interior design practices after graduation, Hicks was awarded Young Designer of the Year in 1998.

In 2000, he launched David Hicks Design in Melbourne, Australia, with the studio focussing on luxury interior and building design. His work is described as blending modern minimalism with luxury and opulence giving special attention to architectural planning and artwork selection as well as his own custom designed furnishings.

Hicks’ first book, Intimate: A Private World of Interiors was published by Thames & Hudson in November 2016, with photography by Ivan Terestchenko and Shannon McGrath and a foreword by Neale Whitaker.

In 2018 Hicks was invited by the National Gallery of Victoria to participate in the Rigg Design Prize which recognises ten design studios who demonstrate excellence in Australian Design.

David Hicks has served as a guest judge on homeMADE and The Block for the Nine Network, Australia.

In 2022 David Hicks was named by LuxDeco as one of Top 100 Interior Designers in the World.

Hicks' design practice expanded to the United States in 2017, establishing a Los Angeles studio that has since redesigned the former 1920's Hollywood Hills home of Ginger Rogers.

== Bibliography ==
- Intimate: a private world of interiors (Thames & Hudson Australia, 2016)

== Television ==
- homeMADE, Nine Network, season 1, 2009
- The Block, Nine Network, Season 8, 2014
