= Salmorejo =

Traditional soup from Andalusia, Spain

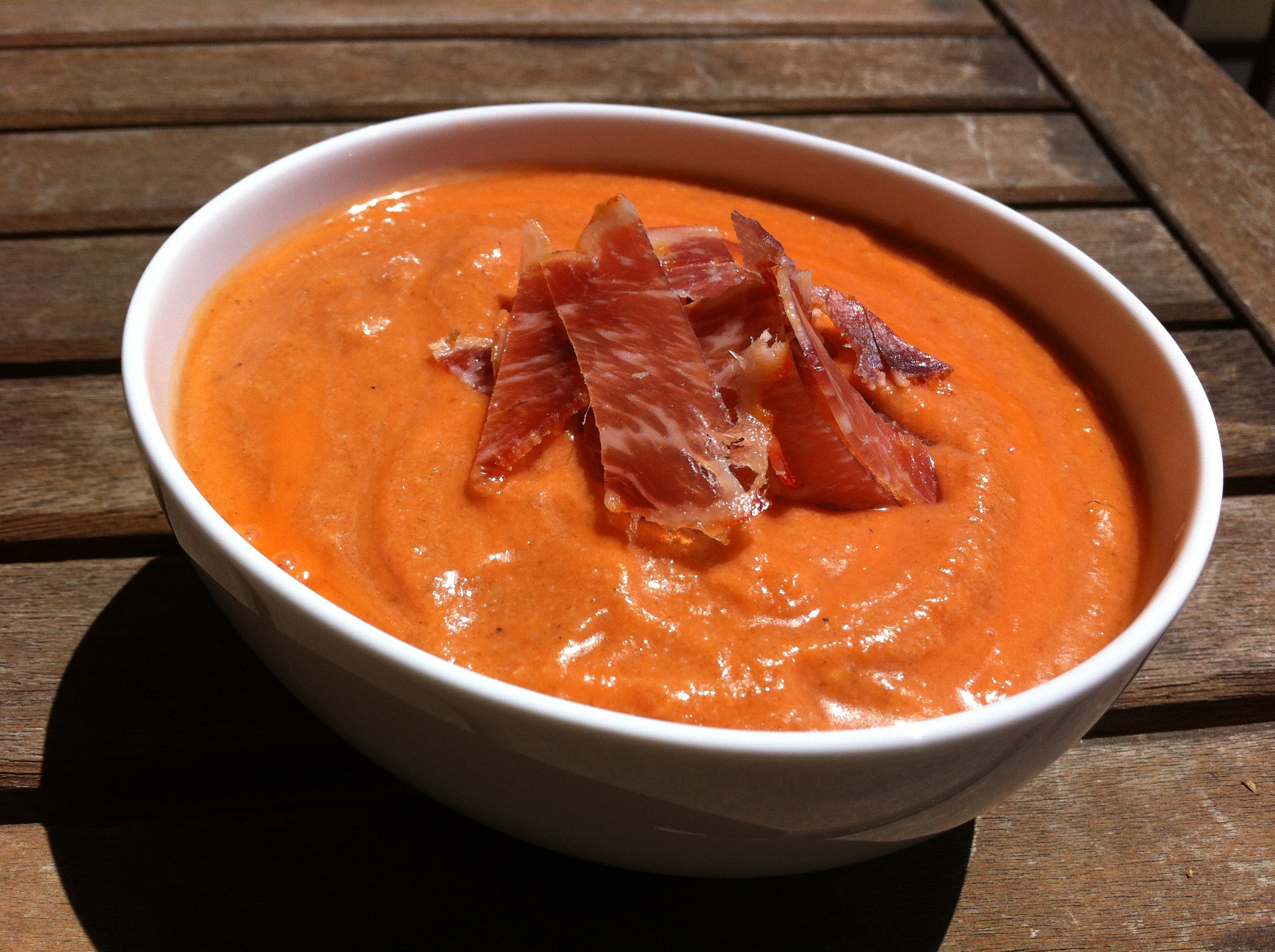
- A bowl of salmorejo with jamón
- Alternative names: Ardoria, ardorío
- Course: Appetizer
- Place of origin: Spain
- Region or state: Andalusia
- Serving temperature: Cold
- Main ingredients: Tomato, bread, extra virgin olive oil, garlic and salt
- Variations: Gazpacho, porra antequerana

Salmorejo, sometimes known as ardoria or ardorío, is a traditional soup originating from Córdoba, Andalusia, southern Spain, made of tomato, bread, extra virgin olive oil and garlic. The salmorejo is served cold and may be garnished with diced Spanish ibérico ham and diced hard-boiled eggs.

== History ==
The recipe (according to Villegas, a member of the Royal Academy of Gastronomy and director of the Salmorejos National Congress) has its origin in the word "aliño" ("dressing") and in principle it was a sauce composed of water, vinegar, salt and oil to season rabbit. It arose after the discovery of the New World and the tomato was introduced to Europe.

First references to the word "salmorejo" date back to the 17th century, being a transitional soup between the old and new world.

According to another theory, the origin of the original recipe was brought from the region of Alentejo, Portugal, after Spanish prisoners were released in the aftermath of the Battle of Montes Claros.

== Ingredients and preparation ==
The customary ingredients and proportions to make salmorejo are 1 kg of tomatoes, 200 g of bread, preferably a special bread called pan de telera, garlic and 100 g of extra virgin olive oil. Normally, the tomatoes are skinned and puréed with the other ingredients.

The bread used for salmorejo is called pan de telera, which is equivalent to Castilian pan candeal. This is a bread with a very dense and white crumb (as it is made with a variety of wheat flour that has a high protein content and less water and gluten content than other flours) and thin crust. Using this kind of bread is important to give salmorejo its characteristic texture.

=== Differences with gazpacho and variations ===
Salmorejo is more pink-orange in appearance than gazpacho, and is much thicker and creamier in texture, because it includes more olive oil and a different kind of bread (in gazpacho, stale bread soaked in water is generally used). There are several variations in Andalusia, including ardoria and porra antequerana (with bits of tuna as topping).

=== Other dishes called salmorejo ===
Salmorejo is also the name given to a marinade typical of Canary Islands cuisine. It is used to flavour meat before cooking, especially rabbit (conejo en salmorejo) which is a speciality of the islands. Typical marinade ingredients include salt, garlic, paprika and hot peppers.

Salmorejo should not be confused with the southern Italian/Sicilian salmoriglio, despite both sharing the same etymology (from Latin salimuria meaning "brine"). Whereas salmorejo is a tomato-based soup, salmoriglio is a sauce consisting of lemon, herbs, and olive oil.

== See also ==
- List of soups
- Zoque (dish)
