= Red pepper =

Red pepper may refer to:

== Arts and entertainment ==
- Red Pepper (musical), 1922 Broadway musical
- Red Peppers, a 1936 play by Noël Coward
- Redd Pepper (born 1961), voice artist who provides voice overs for movie trailers

== Publications ==
- Red Pepper (newspaper), a daily tabloid newspaper in Uganda
- Red Pepper (magazine), a "radical red and green" magazine based in the United Kingdom

== Spices ==
- Capsicum
  - Chili powder, a finely ground mixture of dried chili peppers
  - Crushed red pepper, a coarsely crushed mixture of dried chili peppers
  - Chili pepper that is red, especially:
    - Cayenne pepper
  - Bell pepper, has various colors including red
  - Red Savina pepper, a cultivar of the habanero chili
- Piper
  - ripe black pepper

== See also ==
- Pepper (disambiguation)
