= David Bach (author) =

American financial author and motivational speaker

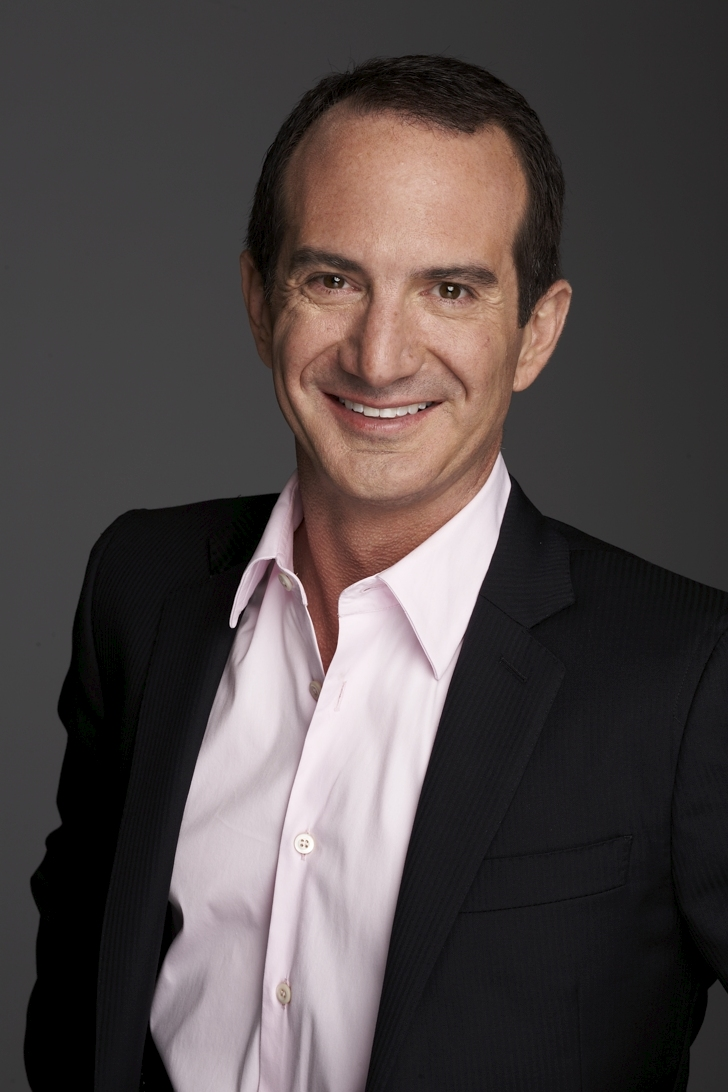
- Born: David L. Bach; Oakland, California, U.S.
- Education: University of Southern California (Bachelor of Arts in Social Sciences and Communication, 1990)
- Occupations: Financial author; television personality; motivational speaker; financial advisor; personal finance columnist
- Website: davidbach.com

David L. Bach is an American financial author, television personality, motivational speaker, entrepreneur and founder of FinishRich.com. Bach, is best known for his Finish Rich Book Series and Automatic Millionaire Series of motivational financial books under the Finish Rich Brand. He has written 13 books since 1998 with more than seven million copies in print.

Twelve of Bach's books have been national bestsellers, including ten consecutive New York Times bestsellers, two of which were consecutive No. 1 New York Times bestsellers (The Automatic Millionaire and Start Late, Finish Rich).

Bach's first book Smart Women Finish Rich was published in 1998. His most recent book The Latte Factor (2019) was published by Simon & Schuster, and appeared simultaneously on The New York Times, Wall Street Journal and USA Today bestseller lists.

== Biography ==
David Bach was born in Oakland, California, in 1966 to Bobbi and Martin Bach. He earned a Bachelor of Arts degree in Social Sciences and Communication at the University of Southern California, in 1990, and was honored by USC as a distinguished alumnus in 2010. segment. He has also appeared on many other nationally syndicated shows including: Weekend Today, CNN's Larry King Live, ABC's Live with Regis and Kelly, The View, CBS's Early Show, ABC News, ABC's Good Money, Fox News, and CNBC.

He has been featured in many major publications, including The New York Times, BusinessWeek, USA Today, People, Reader's Digest, Time, Financial Times, The Washington Post, The Wall Street Journal, Los Angeles Times, San Francisco Chronicle, Working Woman, Glamour and Family Circle. He has been a contributor to Redbook Magazine, Smart Money Magazine, Oprah.com, Yahoo Finance, Forbes.com and AOL Money.

== Career ==
Bach’s interest in finance was kindled in childhood: at age seven his grandmother, Rose Bach, taught him how to buy his first share of stock McDonald’s.

After college, he worked in commercial real estate in San Francisco, earning well and gaining exposure to investing and financial issues.

In about 1993, Bach entered the financial advisory world. He began working with Morgan Stanley, eventually becoming Senior Vice President, and led The Bach Group, managing assets.

He gradually shifted from being a practicing financial advisor to focusing full-time on writing, speaking, teaching, and building his education brand. He left Morgan Stanley in 2001 to make this transition.

Bach established FinishRich Media to manage his financial education content, books, seminars, and related media.

He co-founded AE Wealth Management in 2016, and previously served in roles related to advisor and investor education. Bach was the Director of Investor and Financial Advisor education, overseeing the firm’s educational content, training, and investor outreach programs. Under Bach’s influence, AE Wealth Management has grown rapidly. In a 2018 profile, the firm was reported to have amassed more than US$5 billion in total platform assets by late 2018. Today, it is one of the fastest-growing RIAs in the United States.

== Writing ==
David Bach is the bestselling author of twelve books, including two consecutive No. 1 New York Times bestsellers, Start Late, Finish Rich and The Automatic Millionaire.

- Smart Women Finish Rich (1999)
- Smart Couples Finish Rich (2001)
- The Finish Rich Workbook (2003)
- The Finish Rich Dictionary (2003)
- The Automatic Millionaire (2005)
- The Automatic Millionaire Workbook (2005)
- Start Late, Finish Rich (2006)
- The Automatic Millionaire Homeowner (2005)
- Go Green, Live Rich (2008)
- Fight For Your Money (2009)
- Start Over, Finish Rich (2010)
- Debt Free For Life (2011)
- The Latte Factor (2019)

== Personal life ==
Bach currently resides in Florence, Italy, with his family.
