= Stripey (disambiguation) =

Stripey is a species of fish, Microcanthus strigatus.

Stripy is a 2015 Iranian animated musical short film.

Stripey or Stripy may also refer to:

- Mr. Stripey, tomato cultivar
- Stripey, badger cub that is one of Timmy's classmates in Timmy Time.
- Stripey Bream or Zebra fish, Girella zebra
- Stripey-Jumper, British street theatre group
- The Stripey Badger, pub in Swindon, England
- Mado (fish), Atypichthys latus, known as Stripy in Australia
- Stripy (Bob the Builder), tiger shark pup character in Bob the Builder TV series

== See also ==
- Stripe (disambiguation)
