= The Strip (disambiguation) =

The Strip or the Las Vegas Strip is a stretch of Las Vegas Boulevard South south of the Las Vegas city limits.

The Strip may also refer to:

== Media ==
- The Strip (film), a 1951 film-noir drama film directed by László Kardos and starring Mickey Rooney
- The Strip (book), a 2017 book by Stefan Al about the Las Vegas Strip architectural history]
- The Strip (play), play by Phyllis Nagy for the Royal Court Theatre in 1995
- The Strip (Australian TV series) (2008), an Australian television drama series
- The Strip (New Zealand TV series) (2002–2003), a New Zealand television drama series
- "The Strip" (The O.C.), a 2004 episode of The O.C., an American television drama series
- The Strip (US TV series) (1999–2000), an American television drama series
- "The Strip", an episode of the television series Fallout

== Places ==
- The Strip (Christchurch), two blocks of Oxford Terrace in the Christchurch Central City
- Strip District, Pittsburgh, a neighborhood in Pittsburgh, Pennsylvania
- The Glitter Strip, a nickname for the city of Gold Coast, Australia
- Sunset Strip, stretch of Sunset Boulevard in West Hollywood, California
- A drag strip at Las Vegas Motor Speedway

== See also ==
- Strip (disambiguation)
