= Big Rainbow =

Tomato cultivar

The Big Rainbow heirloom tomato is one of dozens of large fruited yellow tomatoes with red swirls. They have a mild, sweet flavor. The Hillbilly tomato is another similar-coloured tomato.

Big Rainbow tomatoes can be cultivated in the last month of summer.

== History ==
Big Rainbow tomato was first presented by Dorothy Beiswenger of Crookston in Seed Savers Exchange 1983, Minnesota. Commercially, Big Rainbow tomato was presented in 1990.

== Cultivation ==
This sort of tomato cannot stand cold and must be cultivated in warm conditions.

== See also ==
- List of tomato cultivars
