= Tigerella =

Tomato cultivar

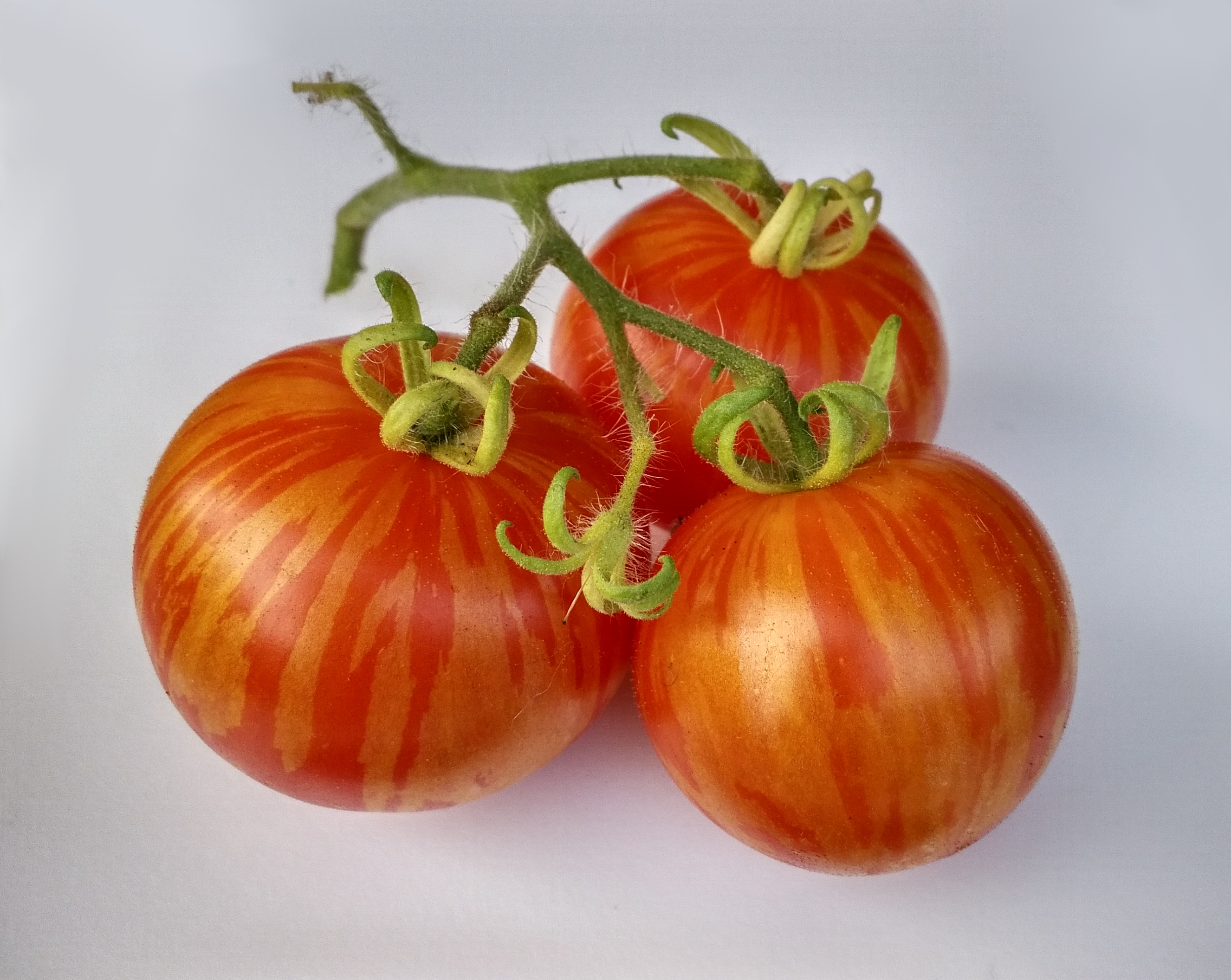
- Tigerella fruit

Tomato (Solanum lycopersicum)
- Maturity: 59 days
- Type: Heirloom
- Vine: Indeterminate
- Plant height: 9 feet (2.7 m)
- Fruit weight: 4 oz (110 g)
- Leaf: Regular leaf
- Color: Bicolor: Primarily red with yellow stripes
- Shape: Globe

Tigerella is a bi-colored tomato cultivar, relatively small, 2 to 4 ounces (60–120 g), and early (59 days). Upon maturity the fruit is red with yellow stripes, essentially the same as Green Zebra, except that the fruit is red instead of green, and has a sweeter flavour. The colour occasionally varies: in New Zealand for instance, commercially produced Tigerella is dark crimson with very dark green stripes.

Seeds are available in the UK for the heirloom Tigerella (which has small plum/cherry-type tomatoes). In the USA there is also a hybrid (non-heirloom) beefsteak tomato that is also called Tigerella, for which culinary results seem to range widely according to a number of bloggers, from large firm and good-tasting fruit to inedible soft fruit which on cutting appears to be all gel and seeds.

== See also ==
- List of tomato cultivars
