= Stars and bars =

Stars and bars most commonly refers to:

- The "Stars and Bars", the first (1861–1863) flag of the Confederate States of America
  - By synecdoche, various other flags of the Confederate States of America, and other flags and symbols incorporating symbology from this flag, including:
    - The flag of the Army of Northern Virginia, which was adopted post-war by the United Confederate Veterans, and has become widely identified as "the Confederate flag" or "Dixie flag"
    - The flag of the Army of Tennessee, which has also seen similar use

Stars and bars may also refer to:

== Literature ==
- Stars and Bars (novel), a 1984 novel by William Boyd

== Mathematics ==
- Stars and bars (combinatorics), a graphical method used to derive the formula for multiset coefficients and other combinatorial theorems

== Movies ==
- Stars and Bars (1917 film), 1917 silent film comedy directed by Victor Heerman
- Stars and Bars (1988 film), 1988 comedy starring Daniel Day-Lewis

== Music ==
- "Goodbye Mr. Mackenzie", a self-titled 1988 single by the Scottish band Goodbye Mr. Mackenzie

== See also ==
- Stars and stripes (disambiguation)
- Stars (disambiguation)
- Stripes (disambiguation)
- Bars (disambiguation)
