= Vikas Mehta =

Urban designer and academic

Academic background
- Education: Morgan State University (MArch); University of Maryland, College Park (PhD)

Academic work
- Discipline: Urban design
- Institutions: University of Cincinnati
- Notable works: The Street: A Quintessential Social Public Space (2013)

Vikas Mehta is an urban designer, author, and academic. He is a professor of urbanism at the University of Cincinnati's College of Design, Architecture, Art, and Planning (DAAP), where he holds the Fruth/Gemini Chair. His research examines streets and other public spaces as settings for social life.

== Education and career ==
Mehta received a diploma in architecture from the Institute of Environmental Design in Gujarat, India, in 1990, a Master of Architecture from Morgan State University in 1998, and a PhD in urban and regional planning and design from the University of Maryland, College Park in 2006. He taught at the University of South Florida before joining the University of Cincinnati.

His book The Street: A Quintessential Social Public Space (2013) argues that a central role of the street as public space is to provide a setting for social behavior. On April 30, 2021, Mehta participated in a roundtable discussion with Vice President Kamala Harris on public transit investment under the American Jobs Plan. In 2024, he was part of a DAAP team that advised the Nodes Project, which advocates for free public Wi-Fi.

== Awards and recognition ==
In 2008, Mehta received an honorable mention for the Chester Rapkin Award for the best paper in the Journal of Planning Education and Research, given by the Association of Collegiate Schools of Planning. The Street was a finalist for the Francis Tibbalds Award and received the 2014 Place Book Award from the Environmental Design Research Association (EDRA). In 2022, he received the Athena City Accolade from the Centre for the Future of Places at the KTH Royal Institute of Technology in Stockholm. Public Space (2023) received an honorable mention for the 2024 EDRA Place Book Award.

== Selected bibliography ==
- The Street: A Quintessential Social Public Space (Routledge, 2013)
- Public Space (Critical Concepts in Built Environment series; editor; Routledge, 2015)
- 101 Things I Learned in Urban Design School (with Matthew Frederick; Three Rivers Press, 2018)
- Companion to Public Space (edited with Danilo Palazzo; Routledge, 2020)
- Public Space Reader (edited with Miodrag Mitrašinović; Routledge, 2021)
- Public Space: Notes on Why It Matters, What We Should Know, and How to Realize Its Potential (Routledge, 2023)
- The Case for Cities (edited with Danilo Palazzo, Conrad Kickert, Christopher Auffrey, and Terry Grundy; Routledge, 2024)
