= Stripe =

Stripe, striped, or stripes may refer to:

== Entertainment ==
- Stripe (billiard ball), billiard balls numbered 9 through 15
- Stripes (film), a 1981 American comedy film directed by Ivan Reitman
- Striped 2, a television ident for BBC Two television
- S.T.R.I.P.E., a fictional superhero in the DC Comics universe
- Stripe, the main antagonist character in the film Gremlins
- "Stripes", an episode of the British sitcom Hi-de-Hi!
- Uncle Stripe, the brother of Bandit Heeler in TV series Bluey

== Decorations ==
- Stripe (pattern), a line or band that differs in colour or tone from an adjacent surface
- Stripes (prison uniform), the uniform worn by detainees
- Stripe, brand name for the first striped toothpaste
- Racing stripe, a vehicle decoration
- Service stripe, a decoration of the U.S. military

== Businesses ==
- Stripe, Inc., an online payment processor
- Stripes Convenience Stores, a chain of convenience stores in Texas, New Mexico, and Oklahoma
- Stripes (growth equity firm), a New York-based growth equity firm that invests in private software and branded consumer products companies

== Computing ==
- Stripes (framework), an open source web application framework based on the model–view–controller (MVC)
- Data striping, a data storage technique
- Magnetic stripe, a method for storing data, such as on a credit card

== Other uses ==
- Stripe, County Fermanagh, a townland in Northern Ireland; see List of townlands in County Fermanagh

== See also ==
- Candy stripe (disambiguation)
- Chevron (insignia), a V-shaped pattern often used in police or military uniforms
- Stars and bars (disambiguation)
- Stars & Stripes (disambiguation)
- Strip (disambiguation)
- Striper Morone saxatilis, a marine fish
- Stripey (disambiguation)
- Stryper, a glam metal band from Orange County, California
- Warming stripes, a data visualization technique for global warming
