= The Strip (book) =

2017 book by Stefan Al

The Strip: Las Vegas and the Architecture of the American Dream
- First edition cover
- Author: Stefan Al
- Language: English
- Subject: Architectural history of the Las Vegas Strip
- Publisher: MIT Press
- Publication date: April 2017
- Publication place: United States
- Media type: Print (hardback and paperback)
- Pages: 254 pages
- ISBN: 978-0-262-03574-3
- OCLC: 958796563
- Dewey Decimal: 725.7609793135
- LC Class: NA735.L3 A4 2017
- Text: The Strip: Las Vegas and the Architecture of the American Dream at Internet Archive
- Website: Official website

The Strip: Las Vegas and the Architecture of the American Dream is a non-fiction book about the Las Vegas Strip's architectural history by Stefan Al. The book was published in 2017 by MIT Press. Al visited Las Vegas for the first time in 2005 to do research on a course assignment. Captivated by what he saw, he decided to write his thesis on Las Vegas architecture and turned it into a book after recognizing the subject matter's appeal to a large demographic. Al reviewed many journals, books, newspapers, and magazines, and visited University of Pennsylvania's Architectural Archives and archives from the University of Nevada, Las Vegas and the Las Vegas News Bureau.

Al identifies seven phases of Las Vegas architecture: Wild West (1941–1946), Sunbelt Modern (1946–1958), Pop City (1958–1969), Corporate Modern (1969–1985), Disneyland (1985–1995), Sim City (1995–2001), and Starchitecture (2001–present). The book explores the economy of the United States, demographic shifts, urbanization, gaming laws, and the resorts' designers and owners. During the Wild West era, the Strip took shape outside the Clark County limits and featured gangster-owned resorts modeled after the 19th-century Old West aesthetic to normalize gambling among the general American public. In the Sunbelt Modern period as suburbanization took hold after World War II, resorts imitated the suburban environments—such as bungalows, extensive parking, large lawn—that were familiar to the growing suburban populace. The Pop City era inaugurated the city's pop culture hotel, featuring neon signs and inexpensive, impersonal hotels.

The Corporate Modern period explores how with as the first companies began to own Strip hotels, the buildings began resembling their nondescript counterparts in other cities. During the Disneyland era, developers imitated Disneyland to attract families to visit. Builders in the Sim City era created resorts that simulated cities like New York City, Paris, and Venice. In the Starchitecture period, casino tycoons enlisted famous architects to create trendy tower casinos in the hope that their name recognition would draw tourists to visit. The book received mostly positive reviews from critics. They praised the book for being well-illustrated, well-written, and entertaining. Reviewers liked the book's cover design for giving readers a good reference point throughout the eras of the buildings' progression.

== Background and publication ==
The book's author, Stefan Al, was born in the Netherlands and is based in New York. An urban designer and an architect, he is a University of Pennsylvania instructor. Al, whose family did not live in the United States, had recently relocated to California. During Thanksgiving week in 2005, he elected to make his inaugural trip to Las Vegas, driving from Berkeley, to Las Vegas to do research on an assignment for professor Ananya Roy's course. Al was captivated by what he saw, saying in an interview, "The large buildings, the lights, the smells, the sounds—everything seemed designed to overstimulate you." Many features piqued his curiosity as a designer such as the Fountains of Bellagio and his hotel room's high-tech features. He decided to write his thesis on Las Vegas architecture before turning it into a book after recognizing the subject matter's appeal to a large demographic.

While writing The Strip, Al consulted numerous journals, books, newspapers, and magazines. He visited archives where he reviewed the floor plans of the 42 huge casinos constructed during the 70 years covered by the book. He visited the University of Pennsylvania's Architectural Archives and archives from the University of Nevada, Las Vegas and the Las Vegas News Bureau. Al in 2016 became scholar-in-residence at the Neon Museum, a significant source for the book and where he learned about Las Vegas's neon signs. The Strip was published by MIT Press in April 2017. It has 63 drawings and photographs. Al devised the book's cover which features drawings of the Strip's properties.

== Style ==
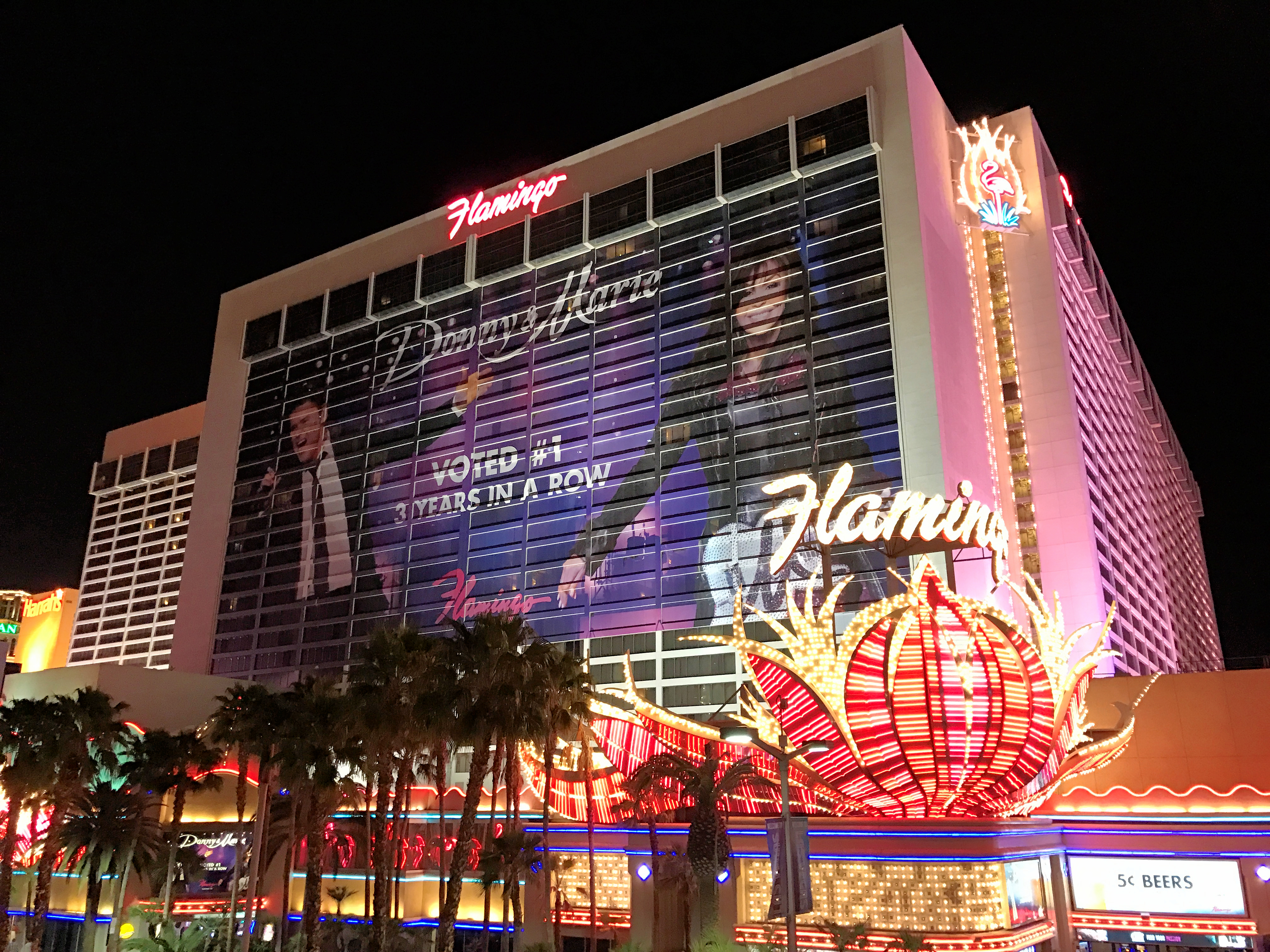
Flamingo Las Vegas in 2017

According to the University of Vermont history professor Chester H. Liebs, the book is filled with numerous interesting tidbits and stories. He cited Al's discussion of Warren "Doc" Bayley, who owned the Hacienda casino. Aiming to lure more gamblers, Bayley in 1956 started to purchase aircraft for offering bundled packages containing economical flights. By 1962, he had 30 airplanes which prompted his airline's closure after drawing the attention of the Civil Aeronautics Board which said it had been operating without a license. Another example Liebs cited was the Caesars Palace sign in 1966 which featured at its bottom centurions with a height of 7 feet (2.1 m). Costing 25 cents, a variety store's centurion figurines was their inspiration. A third example Liebs cited was The Venetian casino where to maintain the water's azure hue, the Grand Canal replica was dyed every month.

Keith Miller of The Times Literary Supplement said the book has "a wealth of incidental human detail on show". He cited Al's chronicling of the Baptist preacher Old Bill Williams, who chose Las Vegas as the base for his crew of Native American horse bandits. Al writes of Williams, who was known to be a cannibal, "In starving times, don't walk ahead of Bill." Another example Miller cited was the gangster Meyer Lansky, who when visiting the Riveria casino resort would walk his Shih Tzu near the pool. A third example Miller cited was Frank Sinatra, who of one his initial performances at the Desert Inn and said, "For six bucks, you got a filet mignon dinner, and me." The Las Vegas Sun reviewer Ric Anderson said the book is filled with "anecdotes and insights" that might astonish readers. He cited how when Bugsy Siegel was constructing the Flamingo, the resort cost much more than expected partially because he devised an escape tunnel for his residence there. Anderson cited Al's discussion of institutionalized racism in Las Vegas, causing it to be branded "the Mississippi of the West". Al chronicled Paul R. Williams, an African-American architect, who was not permitted to enter the Royal Nevada despite being its designer.

To showcase the architectural aspects being analyzed, photographs—spanning historical and modern periods and presented in color and black-and-white—are featured. Spacing book reviewer Jeremy Senko praised the book's design. Calling Las Vegas "a highly visual experience", Senko said he liked the sizable 8x10 pages, which enabled the rendering of large-scale historical images and replications of building designs and posters. He liked how every chapter had subheadings that separate the topics well so that readers can navigate to a particular section. Senko further praised how the "quirkiness" of the subheading names provided "wonderful pause[s]", citing "Casino Suburbanism", "American Babylon", and "Disney À La Vegas".

The Journal of Planning Education and Research book reviewer Stephen Mulherin enjoyed the "period-specific maps" on the book's front and rear covers, noting they depict the positions and outlines of the structures discussed in each chapter. According to Mulherin, the approach gives people "a great spatial reference point" for tracing the buildings' progression. He further praised the images embedded throughout the book for enriching the text by being "well placed and judicially used" and not inundating with visuals. Regarding how the author repeatedly contextualizes the Strip's evolution alongside modern urban development, Mulherin said "[the] placement is logical and flows smoothly with the narrative, without feeling forced into the text".

== Content ==
The Strip is about the history of architecture in Las Vegas. The book, which begins in the 1940s, explores how architectural trends have shaped the Las Vegas Strip over 70 years. It covers the numerous structures and architects that have impacted the Strip. The book delves into the economy of the United States, demographic shifts, urbanization, gaming laws, and the resorts' designers and owners. In seven chapters of the book, Al covers seven phases of Las Vegas architecture: Wild West (1941–1946), Sunbelt Modern (1946–1958), Pop City (1958–1969), Corporate Modern (1969–1985), Disneyland (1985–1995), Sim City (1995–2001), and Starchitecture (2001–present). Consistent architectural designs and land utilization marked every phase. Al demonstrates that evolutions in popular culture, daily routines, and construction techniques shaped the seven phases. To accommodate the next generation of design, solidly constructed edifices were demolished during each phase as part of the "creative destructive" method. Their aim always was to attract people to patronize their properties.

=== Las Vegas as America and Wild West (1941–1946) ===
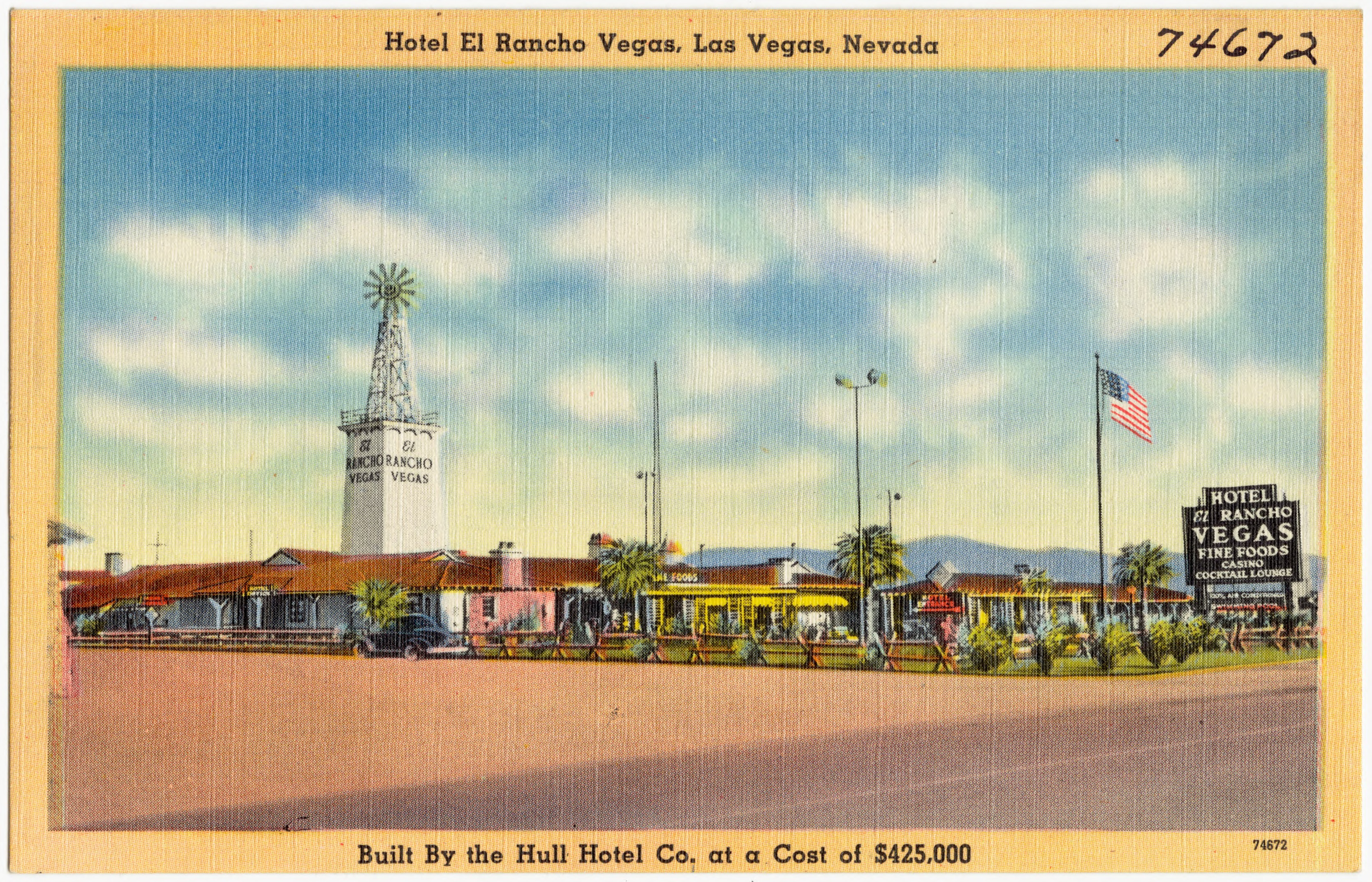
A 1940s postcard of El Rancho Vegas, the first casino built on the Strip

Titled "Las Vegas as America", The Strip's introduction finishes with the sentence, "Las Vegas is a microcosm of America." The book's first chapter is titled "Wild West (1941–1946)" and recounts how the Las Vegas Strip took shape right outside the city limits of Las Vegas after the first casinos started being built in the 1930s and beginning of the 1940s in the Mojave Desert. They were built in a Clark County unincorporated area to avoid government regulations and to have spacious land to build on. The design of the first Las Vegas casinos was significantly influenced by the 19th-century Old West aesthetic, having drawn inspiration from widely watched Western films and from how the neighboring Las Vegas had once been a mining town. Las Vegas was actively marketing itself to vacationers as "Still a Frontier Town". This was despite Las Vegas's lacking a significant link to the frontier culture since its desert landscape was unsuitable for agriculture and raising cattle. To take on the appeal of the Western entertainment, builders followed the Wild West aesthetic to normalize gambling among the general American public. Vacationers were attracted to the city because during the era, Nevada was the sole state to allow gambling. The builders adopted the Wild West aesthetic to promote the region's lack of regulation. The practice made Las Vegas a frontrunner in marketing.

Constructed by Thomas E. Hull and debuting in 1941, El Rancho was the first casino built on the Strip. Initially conceived as a motel, El Rancho later included a casino in its construction plans. The casino's interior has wagon wheel chandeliers and curtains made of cowhide, evoking a nostalgic ambience. Hotel Last Frontier opened soon after. For one hotel, a designer who could not find actual instances of a false fronted Western saloon relied on classic films' portrayal of them. The book provides an account of Las Vegas's history, highlighting crucial events like the building of the Hoover Dam and how Nevada authorization authorized gambling.

=== Sunbelt Modern (1946–1958) ===
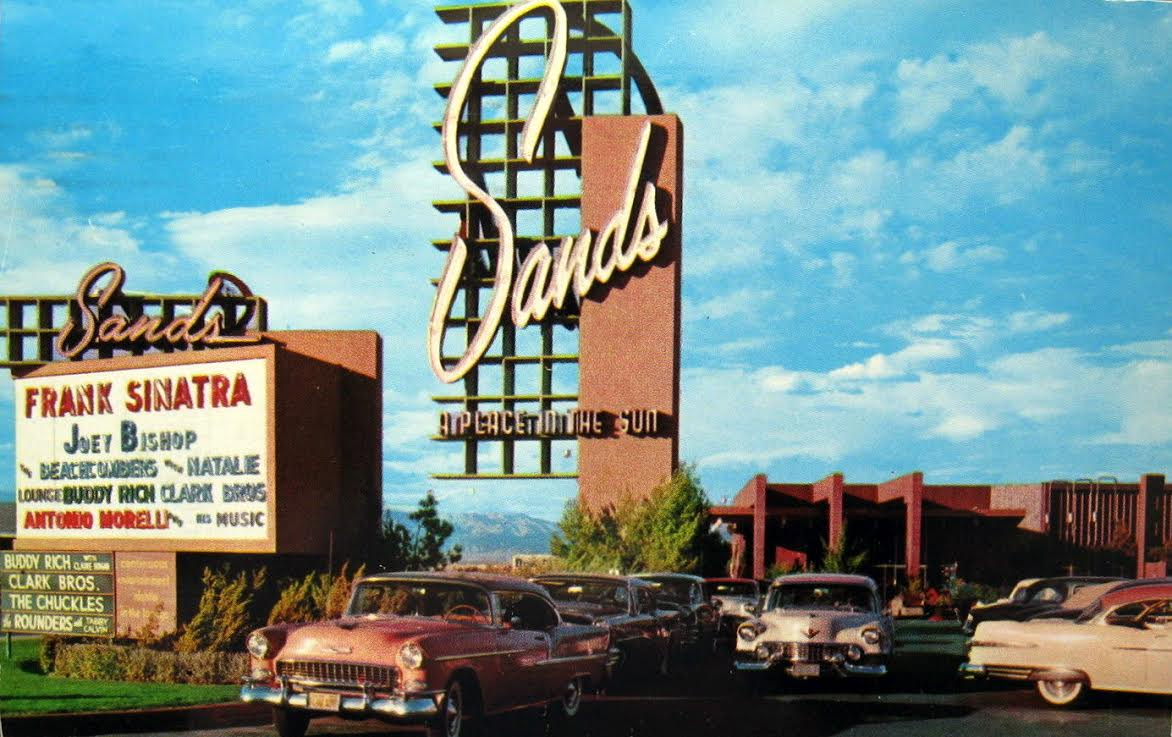
The Sands Hotel and Casino in 1959

Titled "Sunbelt Modern (1946–1958)", the book's second chapter covers the Las Vegas Strip's genesis. In an embodiment of the suburbanization that took place in the aftermath of World War II during the 1940s and 1950s, Las Vegas's core shifted to the suburban Strip from its downtown. Imitating suburban environments, builders tried to lure the United States' quickly growing suburban demographic. They constructed buildings with a low, sprawling profile, typically offering lodgings similar to bungalows. They provided plenty of parking spaces, pools, and extensive lawns. Their casinos had giant signs and parking lots at building entrances which imitated the strip malls arising in those years. All of this provided suburban residents a known and comforting setting.

The Strip's casinos were managed and financed by the mob, so their leaders' preferences shaped resorts' architecture, leading to the constructions of properties like Miami's Fontainebleau and Eden Roc that followed the mid-century modern style. The mobster Bugsy Siegel's Flamingo casino, which featured bungalows, live performances, and giant swimming pools, transformed Las Vegas into the "Entertainment Capital of the World". Frequently with Mafia financial support, Siegel and fellow businesspeople developed the Strip with "clean modern forms". The Wild West style was supplanted as pink paint was applied on the Frontier's stonework and the Strip became dotted by numerous suburban houses. In addition to the Flamingo, resorts that typified this era were Desert Inn, Dunes, Riviera, Sahara, Sands Hotel and Casino, and Tropicana. Al associates Las Vegas's economic expansion with the quest for the American Dream and shifts in the political economy. During the era, there was strict racial segregation.

=== Pop City (1958–1969) ===
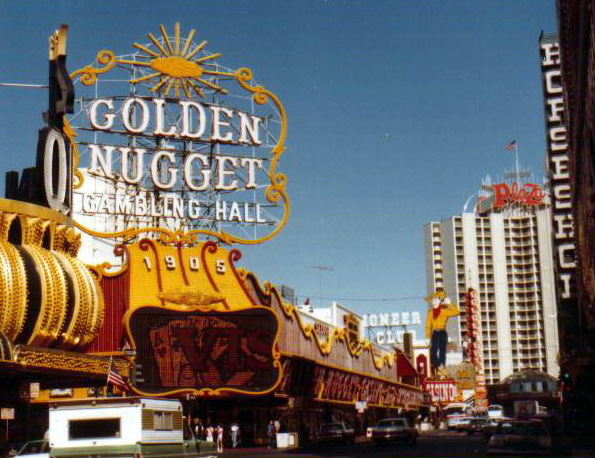
Golden Nugget Las Vegas in 1983

Titled "Pop City (1958–1969)", the book's third chapter documents how cosmetic architecture—architecture focused on aesthetic appeal—inaugurated Las Vegas's pop culture era. Anthony Cornero, a one-time bootlegger, launched the era with the Stardust casino. As they built inexpensive hotels with "as much personality as a warehouse", a number of builders relied not on architects but on the lights. Signs turned into "large objects attached to smaller buildings". A neon sign from the Dune reached the height of 20-floor structures, while an electric sign from the Thunderbird spanned two football fields. Through signs, Downtown Las Vegas's appearance was transformed when the Golden Nugget put up a bullnose, while The Mint put up an eyebrow.

Middle-class vacationers were attracted to visit through the Strip's rapid development. Numerous affordable accommodations enticed the middle-class guests who were traveling by air and interstate highways. The Caesars Palace resort gave vacationers the opportunity to watch shows at the Circus Maximus and consume cocktails while riding a cruising a "Cleopatra's barge" vessel. Jay Sarno, Caesar's owner, said, "Everybody is a Caesar." The book covers key milestones in the evolution of Las Vegas during the time period including the nuclear weapons testing at Nevada Test Site, the demand for electricity exceeding the Hoover Dam's output capacity, the casino resort Caesars Palace's debut, and Robert Venturi and Denise Scott Brown's seminal book Learning from Las Vegas. Alongside Caesars and Stardust, a resort that typified the era was Circus Circus.

=== Corporate Modern (1969–1985) ===
The fourth chapter is titled "Corporate Modern (1969–1985)" and explores how the architecture began to be shaped by commercial considerations. The Corporate Gaming Act of 1967 streamlined the construction of casinos for companies. Gaming legislation taking effect in 1970 allowed company ownership and management of casinos, replacing the earlier restriction that limited ownership to only people. This altered the unfavorable reputation of gambling and supplied Las Vegas with stable financial support as companies like Hilton Worldwide introduced Las Vegas to novel hospitality frameworks. The gambling sector was transformed through technological innovations.

With the uptick in companies owning properties on the Strip, the sway of the mobsters diminished. Owing to this, the Strip became more subdued and sterile as companies tried to sanitize the area. Las Vegas's hotel structures began resembling other areas' standard hotel chains and office structures. The substantial demand for electricity necessary for supplying its numerous neon lights hastened this progression. During the 1973 oil crisis, there was a plea to conserve energy, so Las Vegas adhered to the request and "went dark" for five months. Al writes that the Strip's signage reverted to being buildings' "inferior reference", while neon bulbs were supplanted with less expensive "white acrylic reader boards". The chapter profiles the businessmen Howard Hughes and Kirk Kerkorian and evaluates the Bauhaus design institution with the Las Vegas architecture of the era. Resorts that typified the era were the International and MGM Grand.

=== Disneyland (1985–1995) ===
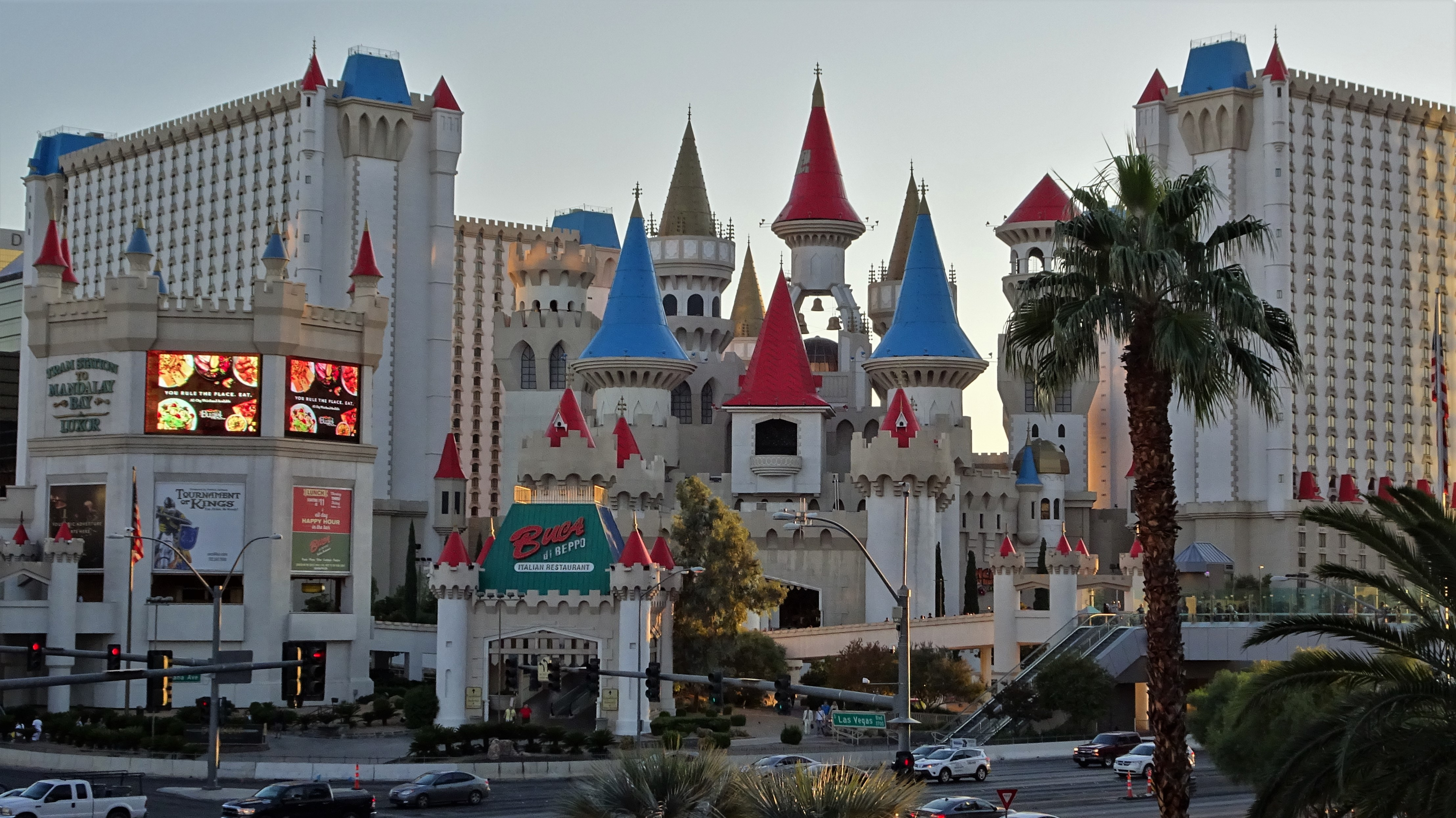
Excalibur Hotel and Casino in 2019

The book's fifth chapter is titled "Disneyland (1985–1995)". Since the latter part of the 1980s, Las Vegas became the epicenter of themed entertainment as it catered to families and the baby boomer demographic. Disney emerged as the top entertainment corporation globally. Builders in the middle of the 1980s imitated Disneyland as they aimed to lure families to visit. Due to fears about copyright infringement, they could not make identical versions of Disney icons. They instead created icons influenced by Disney that dotted the Strip. This included a ship from the 1700s, a spewing volcano, and a bronze-colored pyramid. The developers promoted "fantasy, experience, and spectacle". The chapter links wider socioeconomic shifts—like how the government loosened controls on interest rates for consumers—to advancements in Las Vegas casinos and lodging.

The final thoughts in the chapter analyzes the concept of Disneyfication. Resorts that typified the era were the Excalibur, Treasure Island, The Mirage, and Luxor. After research analysts in the gambling sector discovered that the Disney experiences were attracting families more than gambling, companies reacted by destroying the experiences. The Luxor's Nile was covered up, while MGM Grand excised every reference to The Wizard of Oz only three years removed from having constructed a replica of the Emerald City.

=== Sim City (1995–2001) ===
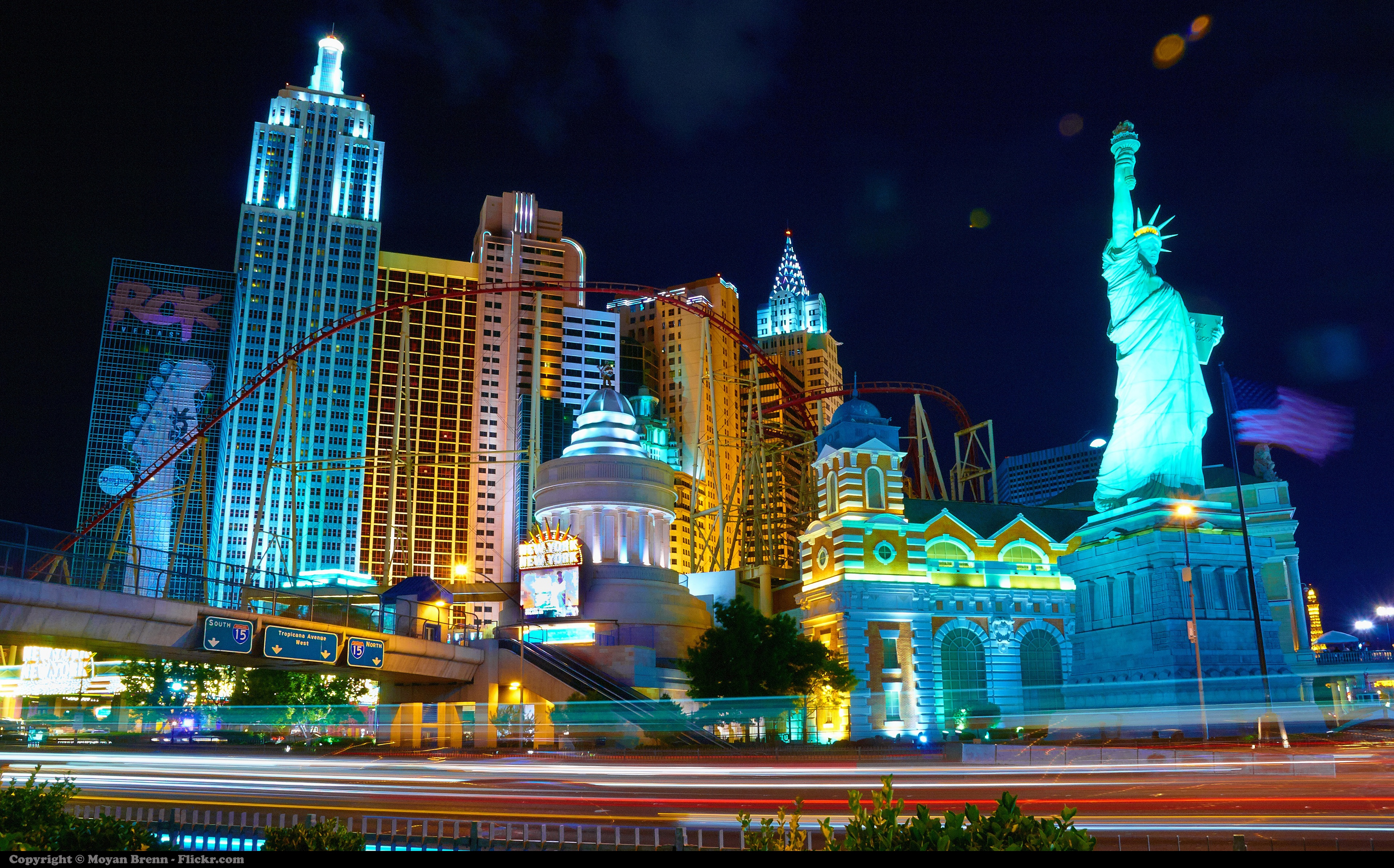
New York-New York Hotel and Casino in 2011

Titled "Sim City (1995–2001)", the sixth chapter outlines how the Strip's architecture progressed from imitating Disney fairy tales to "simulating authentic architectural heritage". As cities like New York for Times Square attempted to cleanse dirty areas, Las Vegas presented imitations that were sanitized and regulated representations of reality. The postmodern architecture theme increasingly prioritized recreating cultural heritage. In Las Vegas, companies built New York City, Paris, Venice, and other replicas. The Venetian, the Venice replica, had a Rialto Bridge, a campanile, and canals. The New York-New York casino, the New York replica, featured Statue of Liberty and Empire State Building replicas. The Aladdin hotel had a Middle Eastern theme with imitations of Cairo and Marrakesh structures. Mandalay Bay had an artificial beach. The replicas triggered theorists to call the Strip "fake". Al examines the tension in the ongoing argument over authenticity that continues to envelop Las Vegas.

After the September 11 attacks, visitors treated the New York-New York's Statue of Liberty as a shrine and avoided the Aladdin hotel so much that it went bankrupt. Al concludes that "even simulacra could be imbued with deep social meanings". Near his concluding remarks about Sim City, Al presents the concept of casino capitalism in which considerable loans are backed by minimal collateral. Builders used this financing approach to fuel the growth of the Strip by outdoing competitors as they developed huge casinos with the anticipation of making profits.

=== Starchitecture (2001–Present) and America as Las Vegas ===
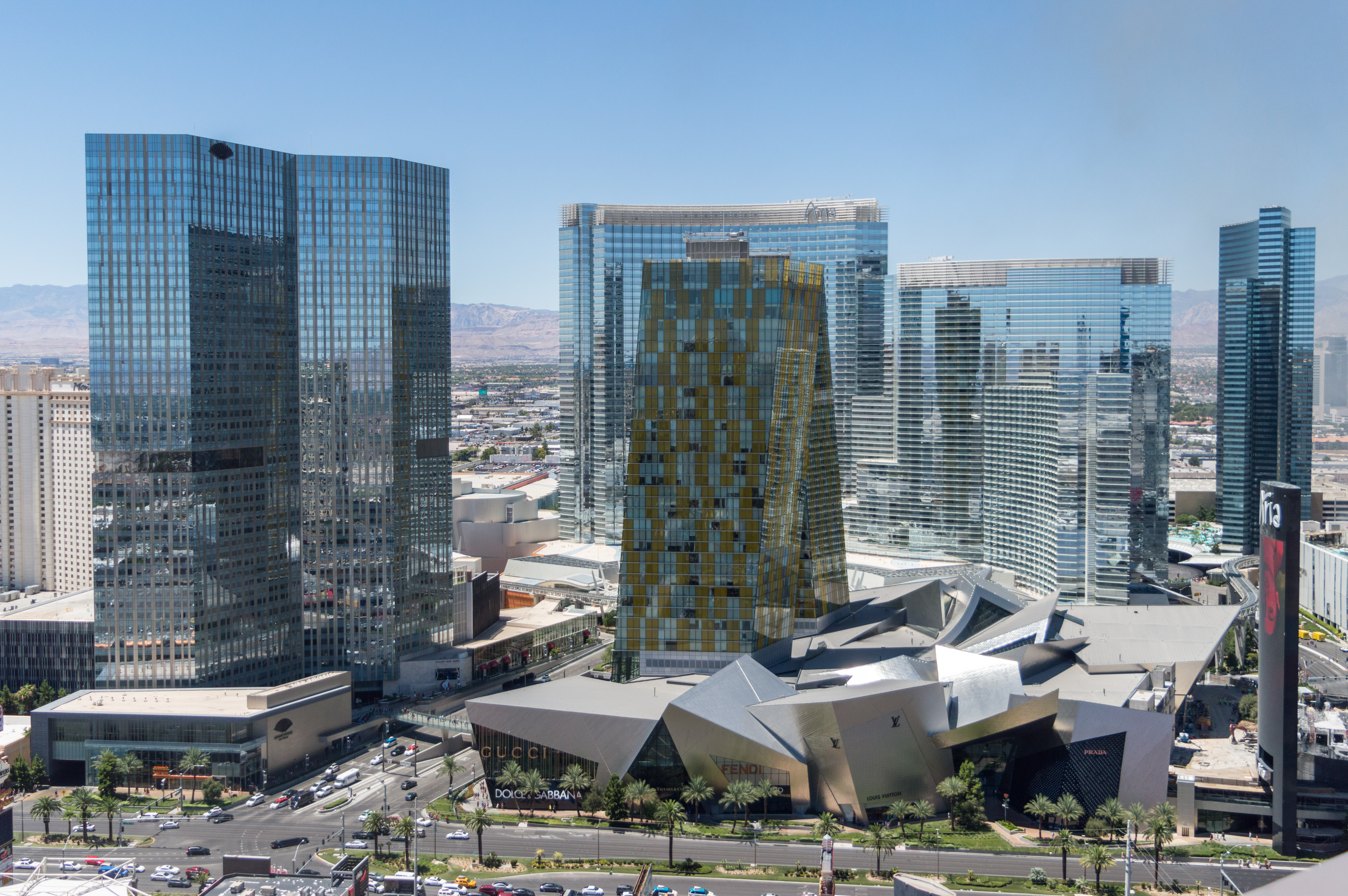
CityCenter complex in 2015, seen from the roof terrace of Marriott's Grand Chateau. From left to right: Waldorf Astoria, Crystals, Aria, Veer Towers, and Vdara.

Titled "Starchitecture (2001–Present)", the seventh chapter chronicles how modern art and architecture have supplanted the previous trend of replicas of cultural heritage. Eminent architects were enlisted by casino tycoons to create trendy tower casinos. The aim was to draw interest and visits to the resorts through the architects' name recognition. To construct the CityCenter complex, MGM Mirage enlisted the renowned architects Helmut Jahn, Daniel Libeskind, César Pelli, Rafael Viñoly, and Maya Lin and the artist Jenny Holzer. Art galleries were architected by Rem Koolhaas and Frank Gehry. Another resort from the era is The Cosmopolitan. The buildings were ornamented with pop art decorations including the large sculpture "Typewriter Eraser" created by Claes Oldenburg and Coosje van Bruggen. The resorts of this era feature shopping malls, art galleries, and restaurants run by celebrity chefs. Branding the trend as "Casinopolitanism", Al notes that several cities globally have adopted it. Macau, Singapore, and additional cities mimicked the urban form of the casino strip.

The Strip had numerous newly built condominiums which aided in sustaining a significant pedestrian zone. Al ties together how the latest Strip hotels and casinos are tied to important aspects of modern life. Touching upon subjects central to modern urban studies, he discusses green buildings, public spaces, celebrity culture, arts patronage, and museums. The chapter outlines how the 2008 financial crisis caused many of the Strip's building projects to be incomplete but that the Strip recovered with the construction of concert venues and renovation of fixer-uppers that had gone through foreclosure.

Titled America as Las Vegas, the book's concluding chapter says, "America has changed along with Las Vegas". The chapter argues that the concepts originating in Las Vegas have substantially influenced the United States and the world.

== Themes ==
The book focuses on not only architecture but also its link to the wider context. It discusses the linkages between architecture and urbanism, the economy, and society. According to the scholar Marta Soligo, The Strip presents resorts and casinos as embodiments of historical changes and worldwide shifts. She said that this gives the Strip "a new, refreshing view", highlighting that these points of interest, commonly labeled as superficial fronts, provide richer insights.

The Strip argues that Las Vegas is not an architectural anomaly. It both influences and is influenced by the remainder of the country. The Strip argues that Las Vegas led the way in larger social developments. The city spearheaded prominent place branding, "self-contained" casinos, and music-filled retail spaces. It led the way in walkability and featuring stores prominently in museums. The reason is that builders had a sizable budget and needed to lure visitors to their properties.

== Reception ==
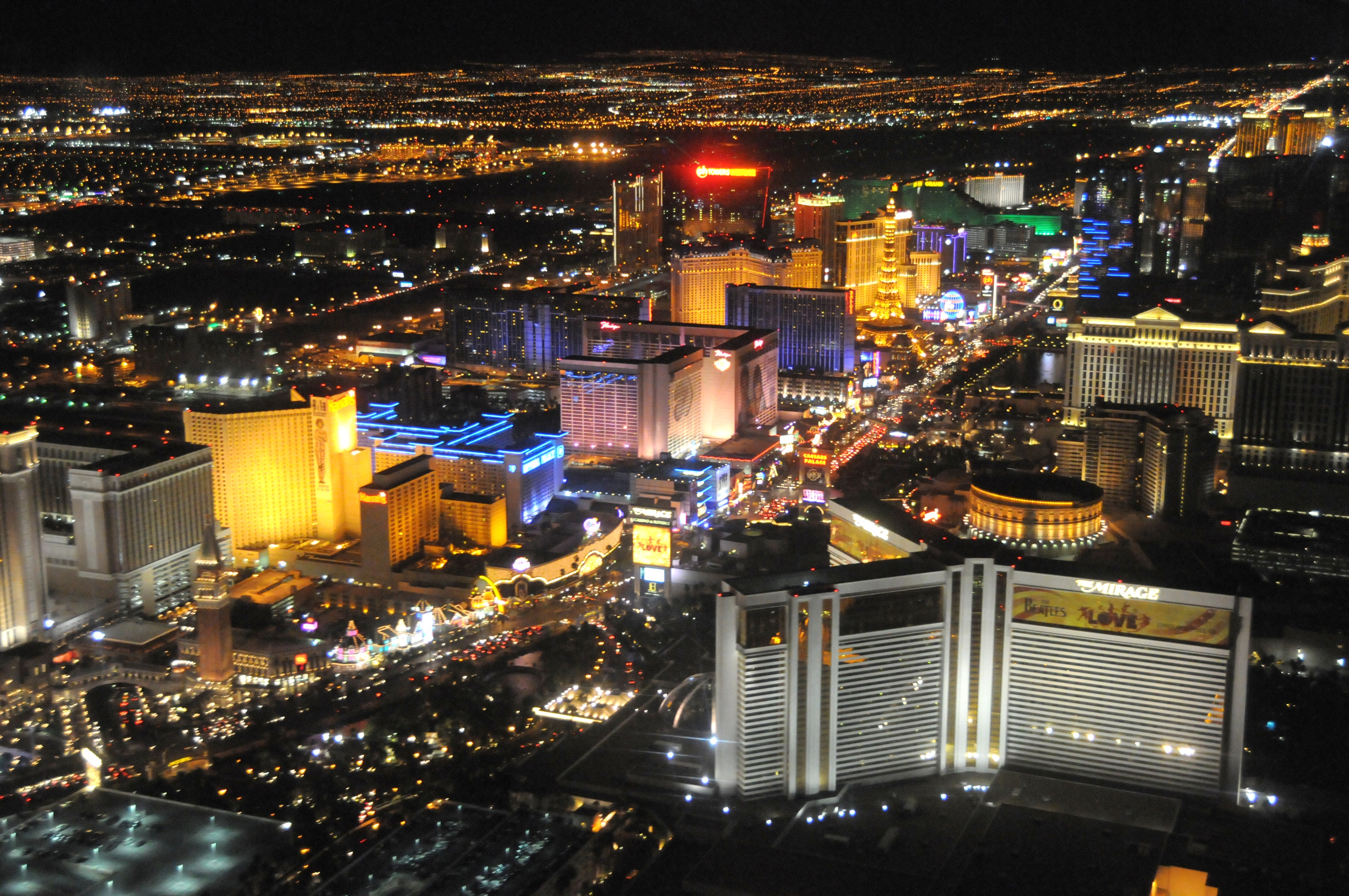
Las Vegas Boulevard South. Journal of Planning Education and Research reviewer Stephen Mulherin said the book should have put more emphasis on the Las Vegas Strip's evolution from a traditional car-centric layout in the 1950s and 1960s to a more pedestrian-friendly urban design.

In the UNLV Gaming Research & Review Journal, Marta Soligo praised the book for "definitively fill[ing] a gap in today's scholarship" and having "beautiful pictures and an enjoyable writing style" as well as being "particularly rich in historical and architectural details". According to Soligo, the book's concluding chapter could have been improved by discussing how sociological shifts affect architecture. The Wall Street Journal's Christine Cipriani praised The Strip for being "a muscular, often funny book accessible to any lay reader". She criticized the book for not providing the names of architectural experts when quoting from them, inconveniencing readers who have to check the footnotes. According to Cipriani, the prose is "flippant" or "occasionally imprecise" as when Al writes "Las Vegas still consumed a ton of energy".

In a mostly positive review, University of Vermont history professor Chester H. Liebs said The Strip "will likely become the classic study of the Las Vegas Strip for some time to come". He noted the book had numerous illustrations, vintage photographs, and historical ads, praising the captions for being "excellent" and for "greatly support[ing] and illuminat[ing] the text". Liebs had several criticisms of the book. He bemoaned how a large number of the book's images lacked dates and their provenance is "relegated" to "a small, hard-to-read abbreviated list" at the book's front. According to Liebs, Al mixed up the meanings of "ranch house" and "bungalow". Liebs said that the author's statement that The Venetian's second tower "ended up overtaking the Pentagon as the United States' tallest building" definitely should be fixed. In the oversights category, Liebs said that Al omits the "possible similarities and cross-influences" between the Las Vegas Strip and America's commercial strips that line roads.

The architect Alan Hess penned a negative review of the book in Journal of the Society of Architectural Historians. He said the book presents a skewed interpretation likely due to its references reflecting their eras' prevailing viewpoints. Al's overview of the Strip resorts' foundational years "lacks the serious architectural analysis" that he gives more contemporary architects of Las Vegas buildings. Referring to the architects in Las Vegas's initial eras like Wayne McAllister, George Vernon Russell, Martin Stern Jr., and Hugh Taylor, Hess argued, "Without a solid assessment of these early architects and the historical context in which they worked, the full significance of Las Vegas is difficult to evaluate. They established the design strategies for most of what followed." In addition, Hess took issue with Al's statement "The Strip began as an exception". According to Hess, Las Vegas's original designers were both deeply knowledgeable about and instrumental in the developments in architecture and urban planning as cars became more popular in the years following 1920. These developments transformed the emerging Sun Belt metropolises which included not just Las Vegas but also Dallas, Denver, Los Angeles, Phoenix, Salt Lake City, San Diego, San Jose, and Tucson. Hess said that Wayne McAllister, for example, had a deep grasp of how cars were transforming city urban layouts and lifestyles, going beyond—as the book suggests—merely copying automobiles' visual style. According to Hess, Al echoes the error of many contemporary critics who have overlooked the shifts and perceived the outcomes as merely odd and awkward without understanding their rationale. Al, he said, incorrectly calls McAllister's designs for El Rancho and Sands "strange paradox[es]", "incongruities", and "glaring contradictions".

Keith Miller of The Times Literary Supplement said Las Vegas's story "is gripping and it's told ably, if none too flamboyantly" in the book. He thought the author should have consulted more sources. For example, he wished Al had consulted Michel Foucault to give "a slightly broader cultural perspective" as well as the 1972 novel Invisible Cities which could have suggested "interesting parallels" between Las Vegas and Venice as both cities have depended on gambling and prostitution and now are trying to earn a better reputation. Miller thought Al should have referenced the films Diamonds Are Forever (which has a billionaire character inspired by Howard Hughes), Ocean's 11 (where the leading characters frequently played at the casinos involved in the film's heists), and the remake Ocean's Eleven (where the bandits assemble at the Fountains of Bellagio). Miller praised the book's coverage of how Las Vegas captivated New Journalism devotees Tom Wolfe and Hunter S. Thompson. He liked Al's coverage of the structures' subtle nuances.

The San Francisco Chronicle's John King called the book a "wisecracking and well-illustrated design history of Sin City's Main Street", while Choice's L.B. Allsopp lauded the "well-chosen black-and-white and color illustrations". In a positive review, Ray Bert wrote, "Lavishly illustrated with both current and vintage photographs, The Strip is a well-told piece of narrative research that should grip both design buffs and those who relish tales of capitalism and culture—regardless of your feelings about Las Vegas." Writing for the Journal of Planning Education and Research, Stephen Mulherin praised the book for providing "a quality analysis of a significant urban area" and for having an "impressive" overview of numerous structures. He suggested that the book barely discusses the momentous shift of Las Vegas from a traditional car-centric layout in the 1950s and 1960s to a more pedestrian-friendly urban design. Mulherin concluded it was "a well-researched, well-organized, and important text".

The University of Pennsylvania's Lauren Hertzler said the book "brings alive amusing characters" while "taking readers creatively and chronologically" through Las Vegas's seven stages. Danielle Prostrollo of the University of East Anglia's American Library called the book "a great read" for people fascinated by entertainment, architecture in the United States, entertainment, or contemporary United States history. In a positive review, Jeremy Senko of Spacing found the book "an exhaustive yet accessible look" and a "wonderfully interesting and fun ride through one of the world's strangest locations". He said the author "has done it great justice, creating an amazing collection of images and historical anecdotes that will delight readers from many realms".

Library Journal reviewer Valerie Nye stated the book would be an "enjoyable read" for Las Vegas history enthusiasts and would attract undergraduates studying American and Las Vegas architectural developments. The Los Angeles Times columnist Carolina A. Miranda said that the "engaging" book covers the "colorful history" of Las Vegas architecture. Praising Al's overview of the Las Vegas strip as "erudite" and "entertaining", Publishers Weekly said the book was "a story of the American national identity, and once you've bought in, this compulsive read won't lose you a dime".
