= Black Krim =

Heirloom tomato cultivar

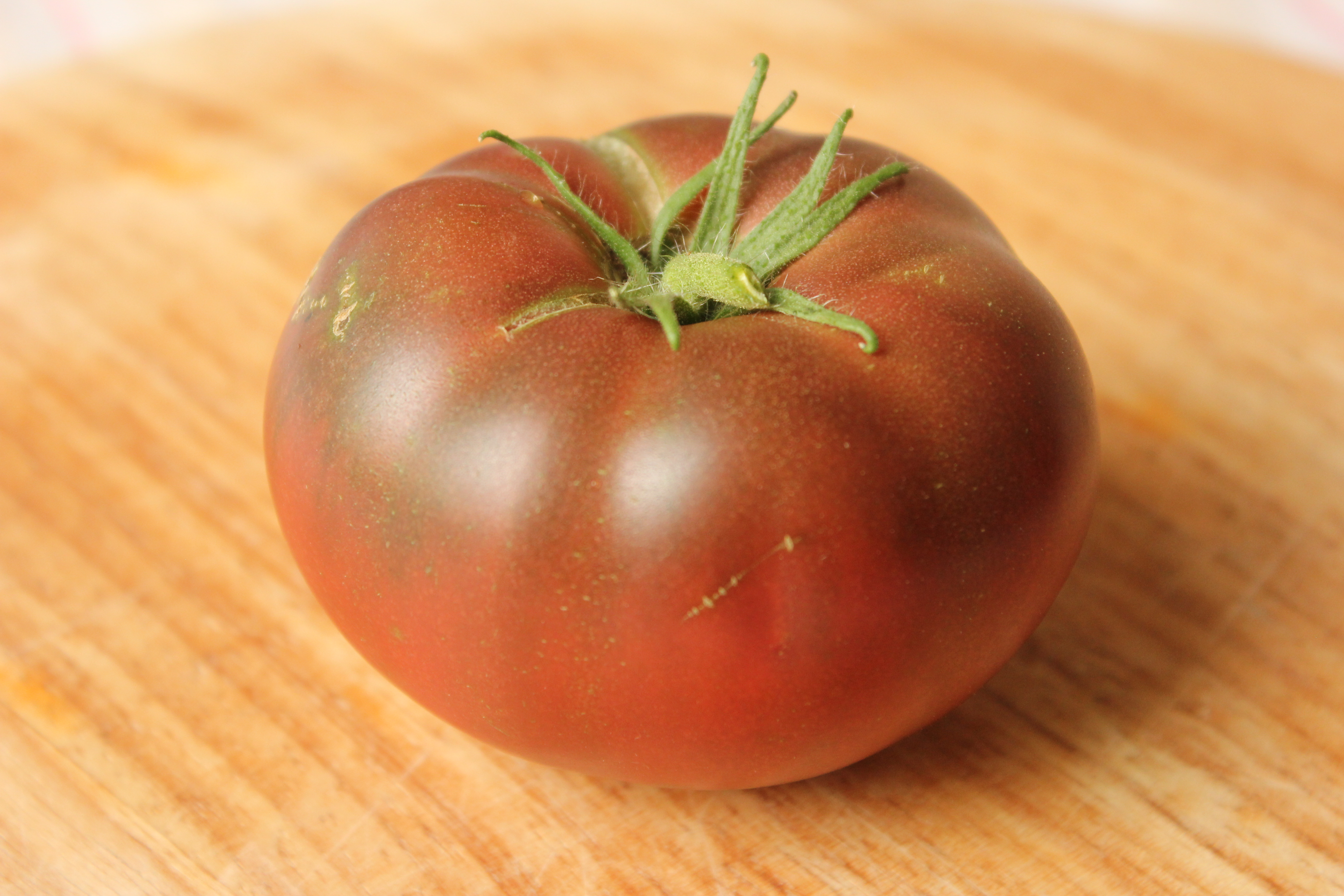
Black Krim heirloom tomato on a wooden cutting board

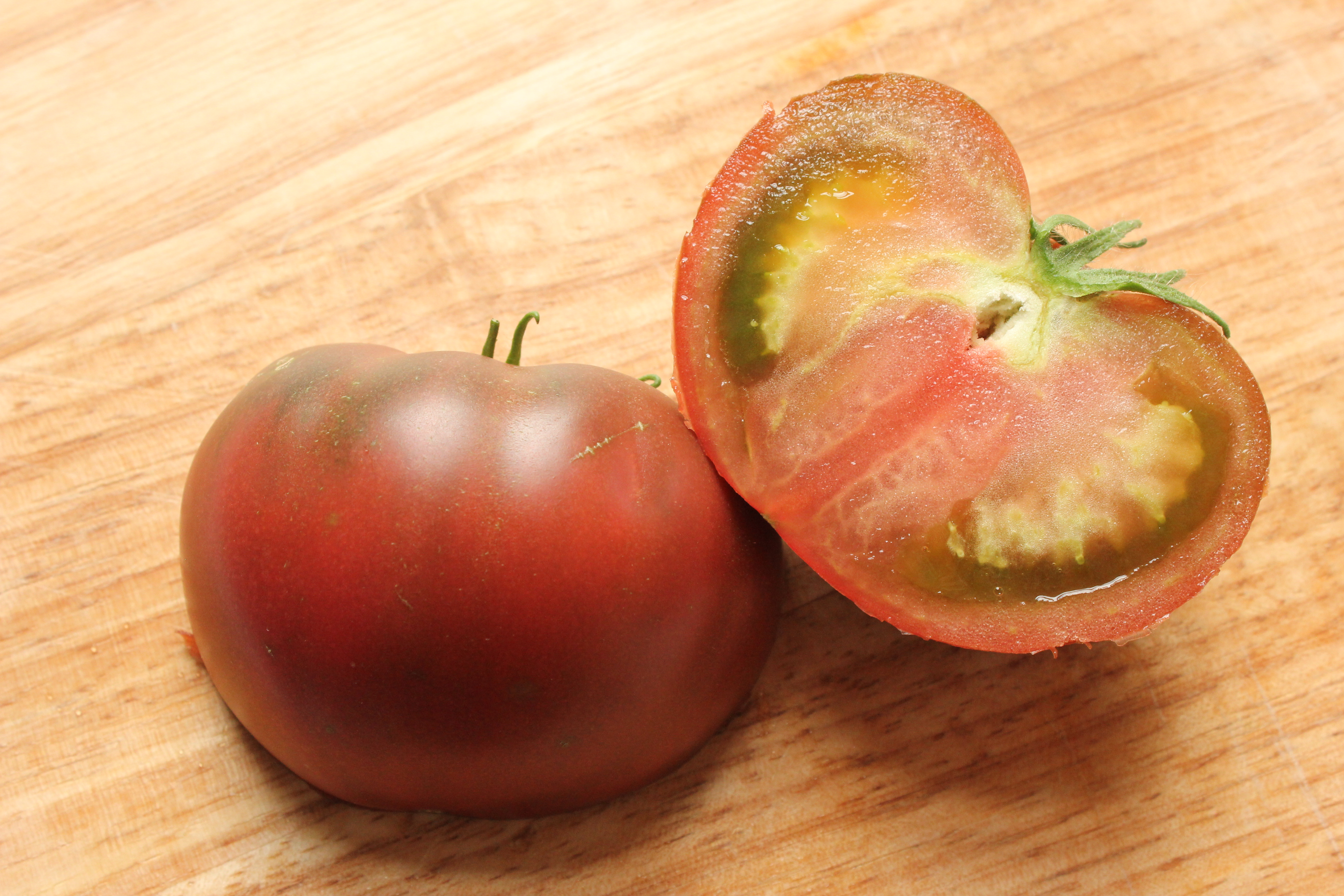
Black Krim heirloom tomato cut open through the top

The Black Krim (Solanum lycopersicum) (also known as Black Crimea and Noire de Crimée) is an heirloom tomato originating from Crimea. The plant is open-pollinated, indeterminate, bearing 250 gram flattened globe fruits with a diameter around 8–12 centimeters (3.1–4.7 in). The unique color of the berry are dark reddish-purple to black in sunny conditions with green/brown shoulders. The plant can grow up to 180 centimeters in height if it is in a greenhouse and slightly less if outside. The berry is described tasting as "Intense, with a sweetness that is balanced out by the acidity". The plants are indeterminate type. Should be planted 3-5 feet apart.

The Black Krim is named after the Crimean peninsula; In 1990 it became the first "black" tomato to be commercially available in the United States and is popular on the west coast for its flavorful yet well balanced taste.

== See also ==
- List of tomato cultivars
- Heirloom tomato
