= Pear tomato =

Common name for type of tomato

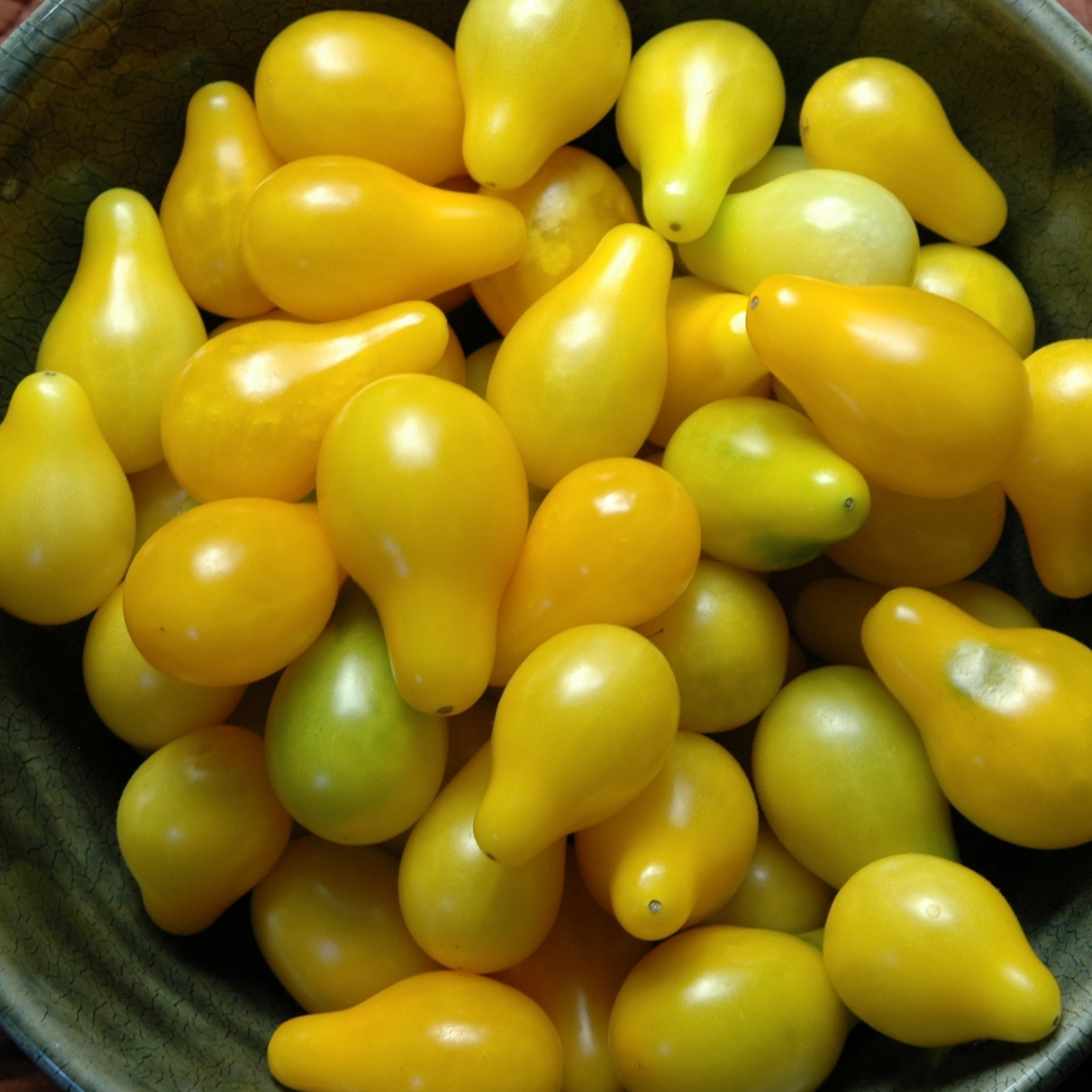
A collection of yellow pear tomatoes

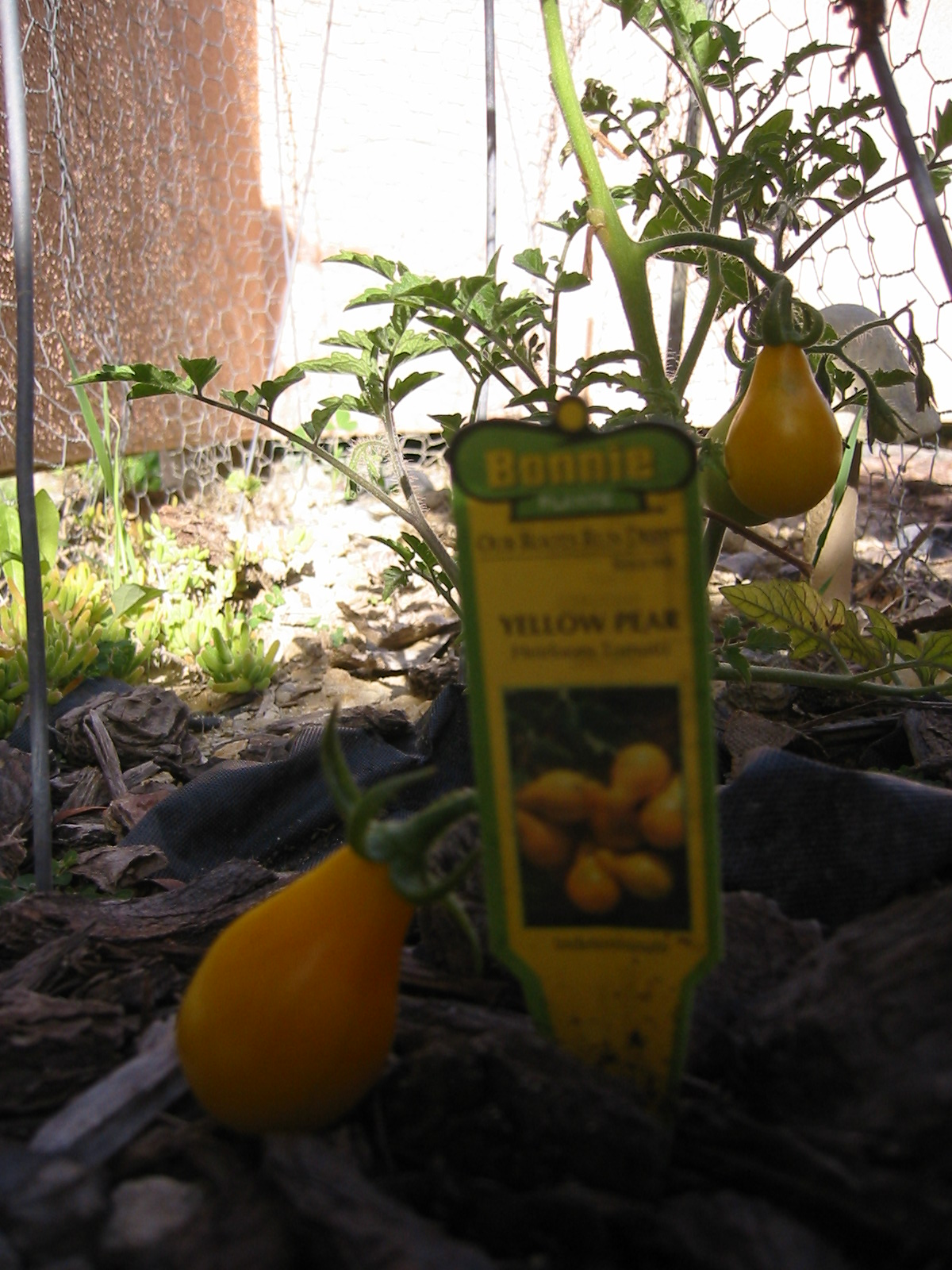
Pear tomatoes on the vine

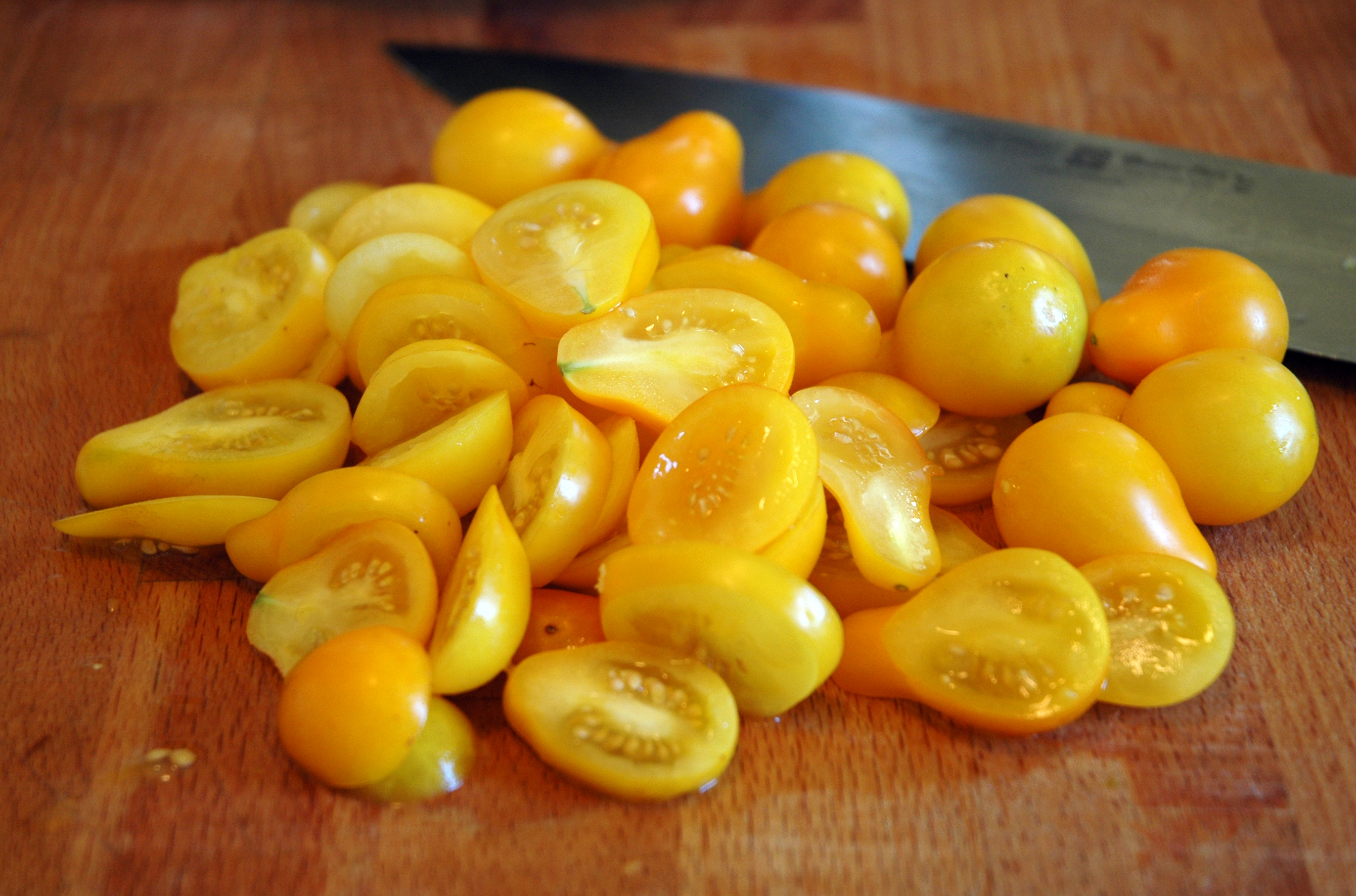
Pear tomatoes sliced

Pear tomato or teardrop tomato is the common name for any one in a group of indeterminate heirloom tomatoes. There are yellow, orange, and red varieties of this tomato, the yellow variety being most common. They are generally sweet, and are in the shape of a pear, but smaller. They are heirlooms and have 3 common other names, such as the "Red/Orange/Yellow Pear Tomato Plants."

== History ==
The tomato originates from the Americas and was introduced to the Europe in the 16th century. The pear tomato originated in Europe in the 18th century. Within the next century both England and the United States were introduced to the fruit. In 1752 records show the English using it for flavoring soups.

The first recorded yellow pear tomatoes were grown in Europe in 1805. In 1825 the Hudson's Bay Company, Fort Vancouver, once the headquarters of the fur trade in the Northwest, operated a seven-acre farm filled with flowers, herbs, vegetables, and fruits, among which was the yellow pear tomato.

In 1847, three varieties of tomato, including the pear tomato, were grown for the table in the United States. In 1863, seedsman Joseph Ellis offered over a hundred varies of tomato seeds for sale in Utah and Denver, including those of the yellow pear tomato. In 1889, George Thomas & Co. sold pear tomatoes.

In 2001, the Smithsonian Institution in Washington, D.C. completed their heirloom gardens surrounding the National Museum of American History; in this garden, pear tomatoes are featured.

== Traits ==
Classification: Solanum Lycopersicum

Plant Size: Averages 8 feet

Fruit Size: Averages 0.6 oz

Hereditary: Open pollination

Leaf Shape: Compound Leaf

== Growing Information ==
Life Cycle: Perennial

Hardiness Zone: Zone 11 +4.4 °C (40 °F) to +7.2 °C (50 °F)

Space: 2-3 feet apart

Growing Habit: Vine

Light Requirements: Full Sun (6 or more hours of direct sunlight)

Water Preference: Mesic (Constant irrigation)

Fertilization: Plants are heavy feeders and require fertilization prior to transplant, upon planting, 2 weeks before flowering, and 2 weeks after first bloom

Toxicity: Leaves and Roots are toxic to humans and animals

Propagation: Plants can be propagated by seed and cutting. Seeds are self-fertile/self-pollinating and can be taken straight from the plants fruit and directly sown. Plants can also be propagated by stem cutting by cutting the stem below a nondual and replanting

== See also ==
- List of tomato cultivars
- Cherry tomato
- Plum tomato
