= Heirloom tomato =

Tomato cultivar

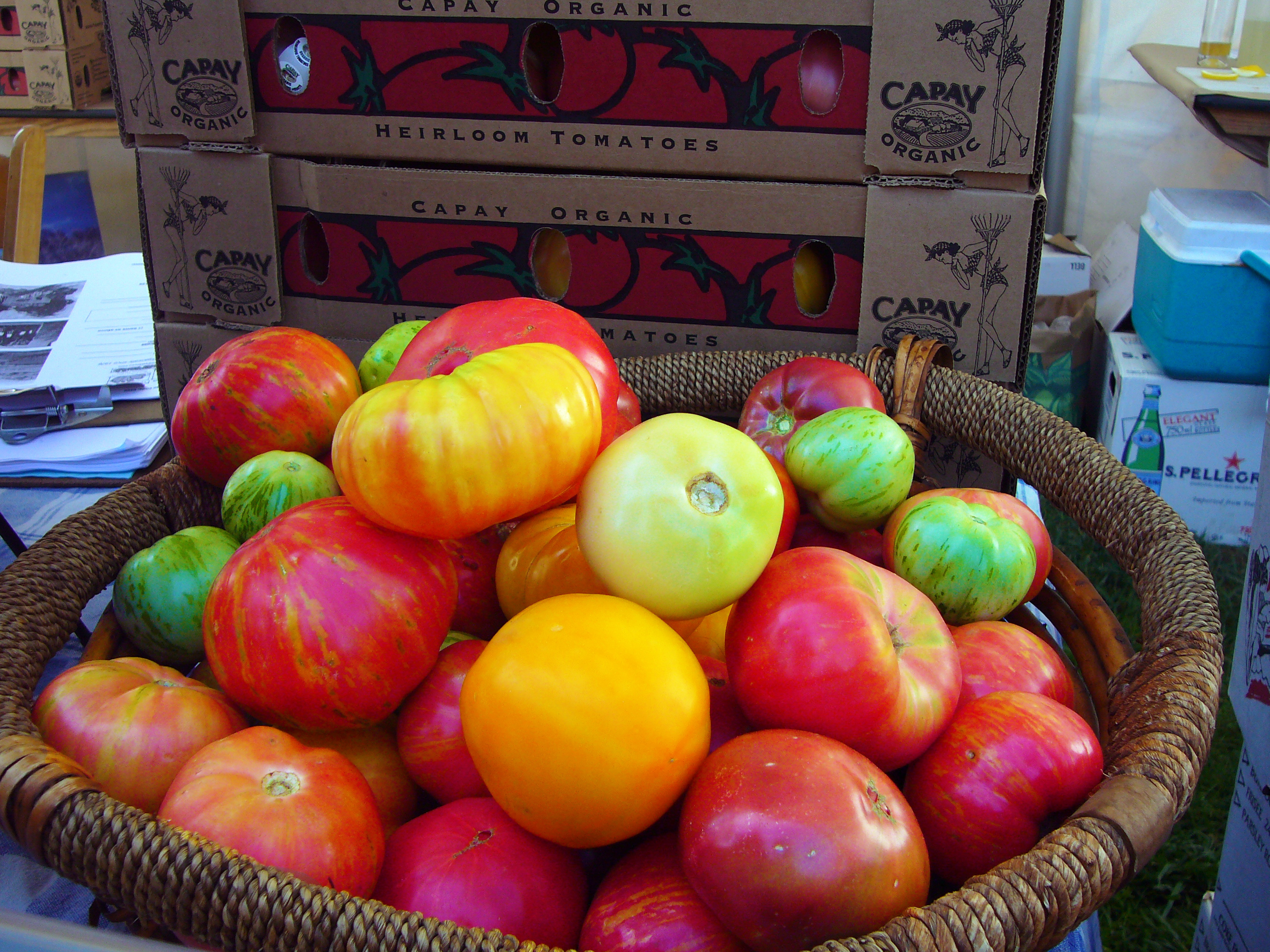
Organic heirloom tomatoes

An heirloom tomato (also called heritage tomato in the UK) is an open-pollinated, non-hybrid heirloom cultivar of tomato. They are classified as family heirlooms, commercial heirlooms, mystery heirlooms, or created heirlooms. They usually have a shorter shelf life and are less disease resistant than hybrids. They are grown for various reasons: for food, historical interest, access to wider varieties, and by people who wish to save seeds from year to year, as well as for their taste.

== Taste ==
Many heirloom tomatoes are sweeter and lack a genetic mutation that gives tomatoes a uniform red color at the cost of the fruit's taste. Varieties bearing that mutation which have been favored by industry since the 1940s – that is, tomatoes which are not heirlooms – feature fruits with lower levels of carotenoid and a decreased ability to make sugar within the fruit.

== Cultivars ==
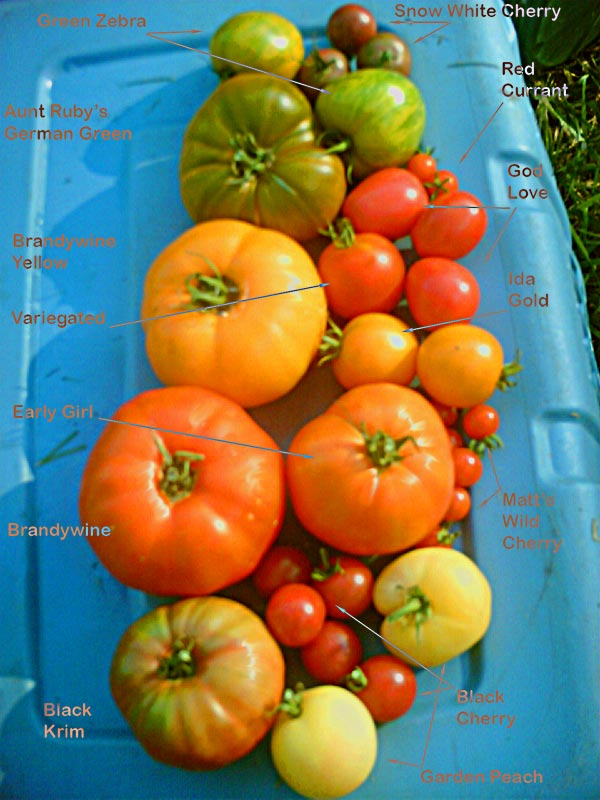
Selection of heirlooms, plus one hybrid, the Early Girl (second largest red)

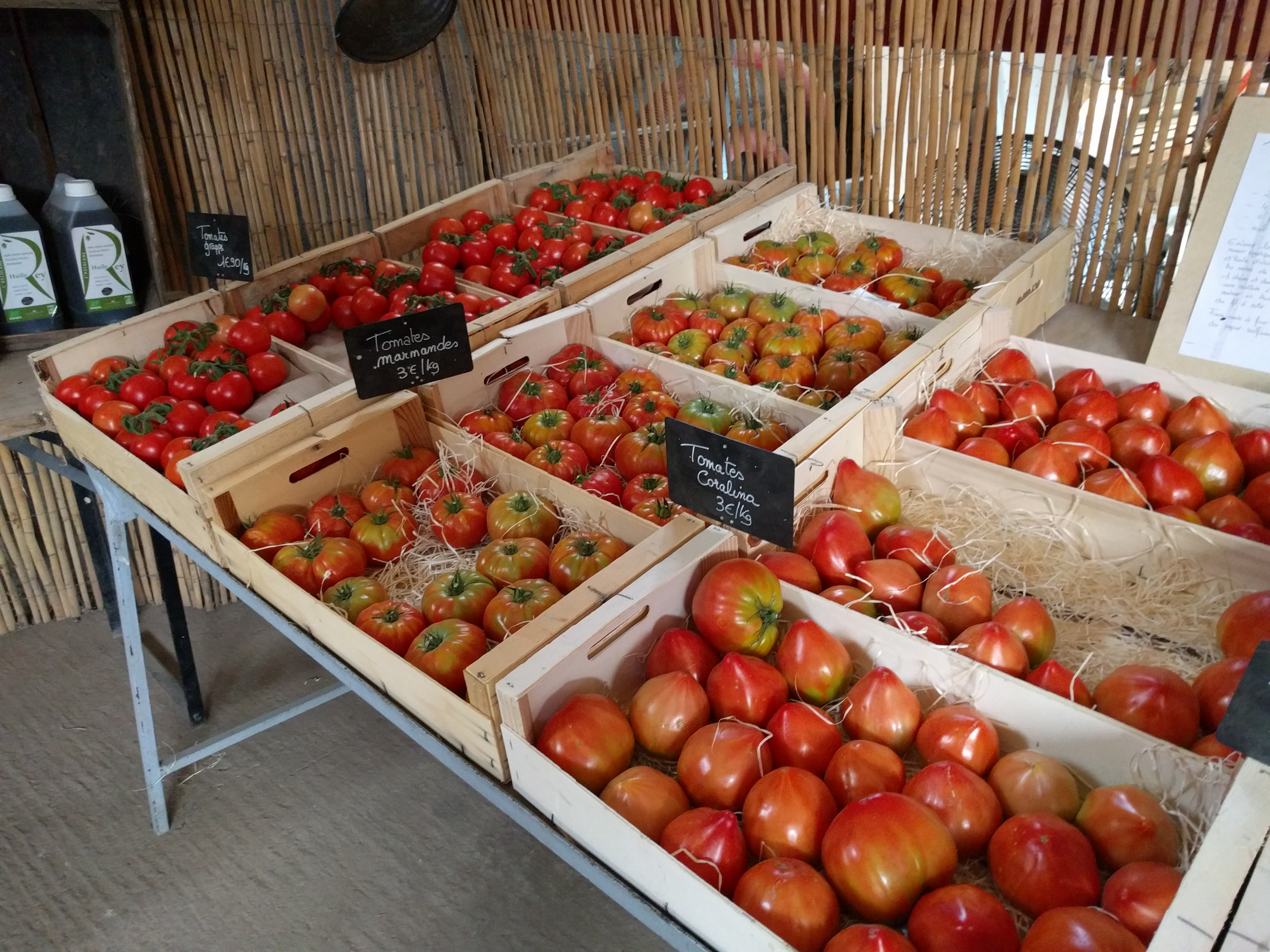
Fresh tomatoes displayed in crates at a farmers’ market in France.

Heirloom tomato cultivars can be found in a wide variety of colors, shapes, flavors, and sizes. Some heirloom cultivars can be prone to cracking or lack disease resistance. As with most garden plants, cultivars can be acclimated over several gardening seasons to thrive in a geographical location through careful selection and seed saving.

Some of the most famous examples include Aunt Ruby's German Green, Banana Legs, Big Rainbow, Black Krim, Brandywine, Cherokee Purple, Chocolate Cherry, Costoluto Genovese, Garden Peach, Gardener's Delight, Green Zebra, Hawaiian Pineapple, Hillbilly, Lollypop, Marglobe, Matt's Wild Cherry, Mortgage Lifter, Mr. Stripey, Neville Tomatoes, Paul Robeson, Pruden's Purple, Red Currant, San Marzano, Silvery Fir Tree, Three Sisters, and Yellow Pear.

== Seed collecting ==
Heirloom seeds "breed true", unlike the seeds of hybridized plants. Both sides of the DNA in an heirloom variety come from a common stable cultivar. Heirloom tomato varieties are open pollinating, so cross-pollination can occur. Generally, tomatoes most likely to cross are those with potato leaves, double flowers (found on beefsteak types), or currant tomatoes. All of these should be kept at least 15 metres (50 ft) apart. All other tomatoes should be kept at least 6 metres (20 ft) apart to reduce the possibility of cross-pollination. Seed should be saved from tomatoes picked from several different plants throughout the growing season that are true to type to preserve genetic diversity. These seeds should be mixed at the end of the growing season.

There are two main ways to save heirloom tomato seeds. The first method is to let the tomato ripen completely, even to the point of beginning to rot, and then remove the seeds with a spoon and spread them on a piece of cloth or paper to dry. Some people spread them out on a paper towel, let them dry, and then plant the paper towel and seeds together in potting or germinating soil. The second method to save tomato seeds using the fermentation process. The tomatoes are allowed to overripe and then cut to expose the seed cavities. The seeds are then scooped out and put into a container. The tomatoes need to be stirred one or more times per day for three or more days until the seed mixture is soupy. As fermentation occurs, some fungal growth will appear on top of the mixture, but that is normal. At the end of the fermentation process, the seed mixture is stirred, and the seeds dislodge from the gel and sink to the bottom of the container. Water is then poured into the mixture; the pulp and the bad seeds will rise to the top and flow over the side of the container, while the good seeds sink to the bottom. Once the water becomes clear, strain the remaining seeds, then spread the seeds out to dry. Once the seeds are dry, mix the seeds together, breaking apart any that are stuck together, and put the seeds in a tightly sealed plastic bag. Seeds should be dated, labeled, and stored at room temperature, away from direct sunlight. Heirloom tomato seeds may be stored for up to ten years.

== See also ==
- Heirloom plant
- List of tomato cultivars
