= Stars and Stripes Forever (disambiguation) =

"The Stars and Stripes Forever" is a march by American composer John Philip Sousa.

Stars and Stripes Forever may also refer to:

- Stars and Stripes Forever (film), a 1952 biopic about John Philip Sousa, starring Clifton Webb, Debra Paget, Robert Wagner, and Ruth Hussey
- Stars and Stripes Forever, a 1998 science fiction novel by Harry Harrison, the first book in the Stars and Stripes trilogy
- Stars & Stripes Forever (album) by the Nitty Gritty Dirt Band
- "The Stars and Stripes Forever", a song from the 2003 album The Civil War by Matmos
- "Stars and Stripes Forever", an assortment of action figures released by Toys "R" Us to celebrate the 15th anniversary of the G.I. Joe: A Real American Hero toyline

== See also ==
- Stars & Stripes (disambiguation)
