= Test strip =

A test strip is a band/piece/strip of paper or other material used for biological testing.

Specifically, test strip may refer to:

- Food testing strips
- Glucose meter test strip
- Lipolysis test strip
- Urine test strip
- Universal indicator pH test strips

It may also refer to:

- Teststrip, an art gallery in Auckland, New Zealand

== See also ==
- Test (disambiguation)
- Strip (disambiguation)
