= Stripped =

Stripped may refer to:

== Music ==
- "Stripped" (song), by Depeche Mode, 1986
- Stripped (Christina Aguilera album) or the title song, 2002
- Stripped (Daniel Ash album), 2014
- Stripped (Macy Gray album), 2016
- Stripped (Pretty Maids album), 1993
- Stripped (Rolling Stones album), 1995
- Stripped (We the Kings album), 2014
- Stripped (Hinder EP), 2016
- Stripped, an EP by Dylan Scott, 2018
- Stripped, an EP by The Score, 2017
- Stripped, an EP by Sam Smith, 2020
- Stripped, an album by Stage Dolls, 1991
- "Stripped", a song by Jesus Jones from Doubt, 1991
- "Stripped", a song by Neurosis on their album Souls at Zero, 1992

== Other uses ==
- Stripped (film), a 2014 American documentary film
- Stripped (franchise), a reality-documentary television series with several international versions
- Stripped (tour), a 2009 comedy tour by Eddie Izzard
- "Stripped" (The Good Wife), a 2009 television episode

== See also ==
- Strip (disambiguation)
