= Mr. Stripey =

Tomato cultivar

Mister Stripey
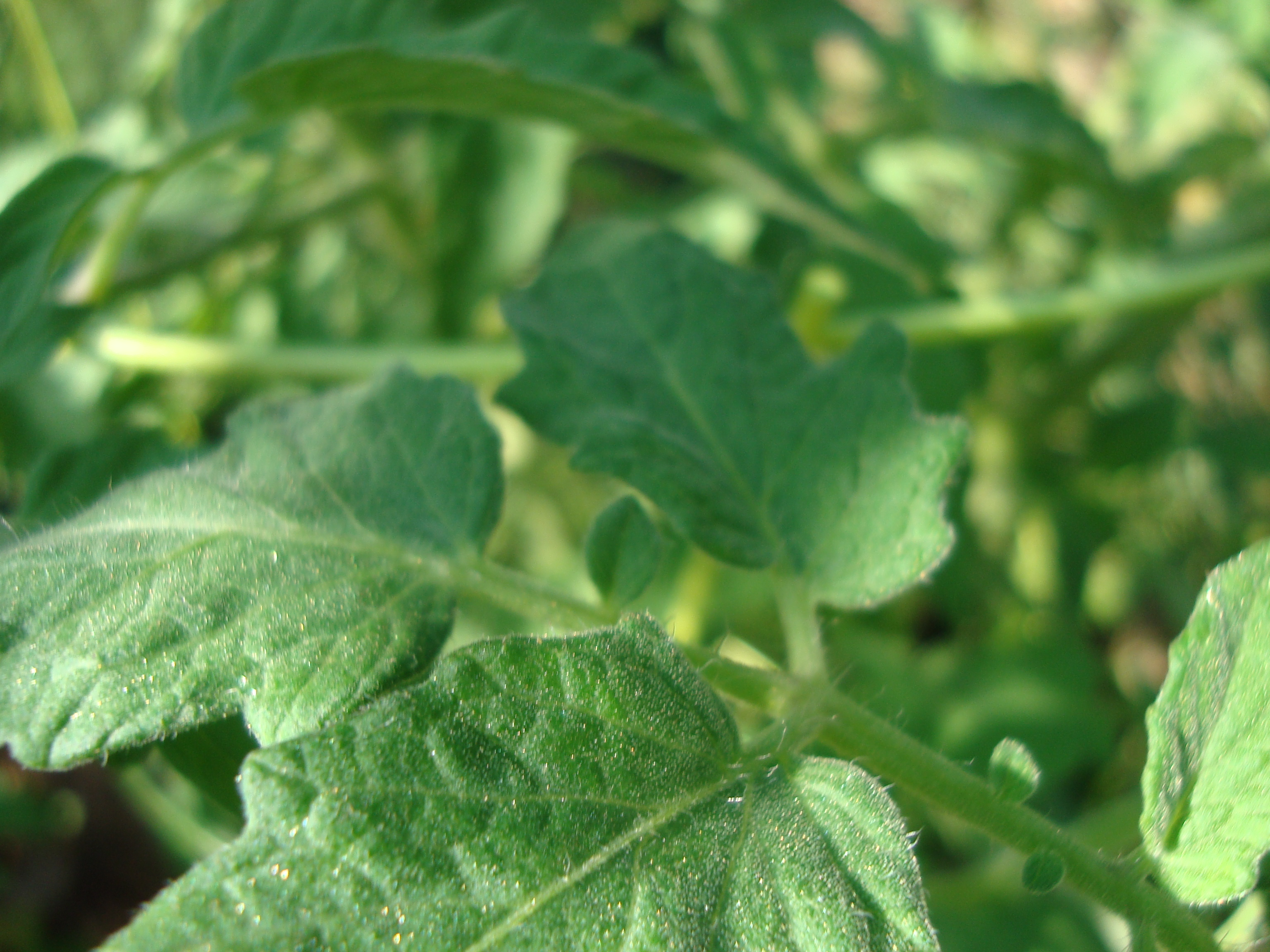
- The leaves of the plant

Tomato (Solanum lycopersicum)
- Maturity: 80 days
- Type: Heirloom
- Vine: Indeterminate
- Plant height: 9 feet
- Fruit weight: 6 to 24 oz
- Leaf: Regular leaf
- Color: Dusky red, green shoulders
- Shape: Beefsteak

Mr. Stripey (sometimes confused with Tigerella) is a type of heirloom tomato with unusually small leaves and a mix of a yellow and red color that can fool some growers into thinking they are picking an unripe tomato.

Under good conditions in size, shape and internal structure it may be considered a "beefsteak". Tigerella is generally smaller than the Mr Stripey variety and the colors are less defined. They are actually two distinct heirloom varieties. Tigerella isn't as sweet or "low-acid" as the Mr. Stripey variety, either. Like other heirloom varieties, Mr. Stripey has an appearance that differs considerably from other tomatoes. In coloration, it is more yellow near the stem and more red towards its underside, with gentle stripes of red and yellow blending into each other along the sides. This coloration may extend into the interior of the fruit, which tends to be more yellow than red.

Under the correct conditions, this variety develops a mild and sweet taste. The mild character of the tomato flavor is best used where it is intended to blend in with other flavors, such as in a pasta sauce or salad. The sweetness of the tomato is most notable when sliced raw. The ripe flesh is soft, juicy, and tender.

== See also ==
- List of tomato cultivars
- List of heirloom tomato cultivars
