= Strip =

Strip, Strips or Stripping may refer to:

== Places ==
- Aouzou Strip, a strip of land following the northern border of Chad that had been claimed and occupied by Libya
- Caprivi Strip, narrow strip of land extending from the Okavango Region of Namibia to the Zambezi River
- Gaza Strip, narrow strip of land along the Mediterranean, in the Middle East
- Las Vegas Strip, section of Las Vegas Boulevard South
- Cotai Strip, an area of hotels and casinos in Macau
- Strip District, Pittsburgh, a neighborhood in Pittsburgh, Pennsylvania
- Sunset Strip, 1.5-mile stretch of Sunset Boulevard in West Hollywood, California, US
- Tarfaya Strip (Cape Juby Strip), a strip of land between Morocco and the Western Sahara along the Atlantic Ocean
- Toledo strip, formerly contested area between Ohio and Michigan; see Toledo War

== Arts, entertainment, and media ==
=== Comics ===
- Strip (comics), a comics anthology published by Marvel UK in 1990
- Comic strip, a sequence of drawings arranged in interrelated panels to display brief humor or form a narrative
- Sunday strip, a newspaper comic-strip format

=== Erotic dancing ===
- Striptease, act of removing one's clothes slowly to music
  - Strip club, a venue that regularly provides adult entertainment, predominantly in the form of striptease or other erotic or exotic dances
  - Stripper, a professional erotic dancer who performs a contemporary form of striptease

=== Films ===
- Filmstrip, a form of still image instructional multimedia, once commonly used by educators in primary and secondary schools (K-12)
- Stripping (film), a 2002 Finnish film
- The Strip (1951 film), a 1951 film directed by László Kardos

=== Music ===
- Strip (Adam Ant album), 1983 pop rock album
- Strip (The Chameleons album), 2000 post-punk band album
- "Strip" (Chris Brown song), a 2011 song by Chris Brown
- "Strip", a 2018 song by Little Mix featuring Sharaya J from LM5
- "The Strip" (Scarlet Pleasure song), 2014

=== Television ===
- The Strip (Australian TV series), a 2008 Australian television drama series
- The Strip (New Zealand TV series), 2002–2003 New Zealand television series
- "The Strip" (The O.C.), a 2004 episode of The O.C. television series
- The Strip (American TV series), 1999–2000 American action drama series
- Strip programming, a practice of running a television series at the same time daily

== Aviation ==
- Airstrip, a kind of airport that consists only of a runway with perhaps fueling equipment
- Landing strip or runway, an area for the landing and takeoff of aircraft

== Finance ==
- Strip bond, a financial instrument
- Strip (options), an option trading strategy in finance
- Separate Trading of Registered Interest and Principal of Securities (STRIPS), a United States Treasury term for the securities obtained when trading the coupons and principal of bonds separately

== Science and technology ==
- Strip (Unix), Unix computer command program
- Stripping (chemistry), removal of one or more components from a liquid stream to a vapor stream
- Stripping (fiber), the act of removing the protective polymer coating around optical fiber in preparation for fusion splicing
- Stripping (textiles), color removal process in textiles
- Stripping (printing), preparation & assembly of printing negatives in pre-press
- Paint stripper, a solvent that removes paint
- Stanford Research Institute Problem Solver (STRIPS), an artificial intelligence system for automated planning
- Triangle strip, method for rendering computer graphics
- Vein stripping, a surgical procedure
- Weatherstripping, the process of sealing openings such as doors, windows, and trunks from the elements; also, the sealant materials used

== Other uses ==
- Chicken strips, another name for chicken fingers, a prepared form of chicken meat
- Strip steak, type of beef steak
- Stripping (linguistics), an ellipsis mechanism that elides everything from a clause except one constituent
- Football strip, standard attire worn while playing association football
- Landing strip, or French waxing, a type of bikini waxing

== See also ==
- Test strip (disambiguation)
- The Strip (disambiguation)
- Stripped (disambiguation)
- Strips (disambiguation)
- Piece (disambiguation)
- Section (disambiguation)
- Segment (disambiguation)
- Slice (disambiguation)
- Stripe (disambiguation)
