= Marglobe =

Disease resistant tomato

The Marglobe tomato was developed in 1917 by Frederick J. Pritchard of the United States Department of Agriculture's Agricultural Experiment Station by crossing the Marvel and Globe tomatoes ("Marglobe" is a fusion of the two names). It was publicly released by the USDA in 1925, and was one of the first disease-resistant strains that also had a good resistance to Verticillium and Fusarium wilt. The Marglobe tomato is the parent of many tomato varieties, such as Rutgers.

The Seed Savers Exchange yearbook lists several types of Marglobe variants: Marglobe F, Marglobe Improved, Marglobe Larson, Marglobe Supreme, and Marglobe Supreme F.
