= Green Zebra =

Variety of hybrid tomato

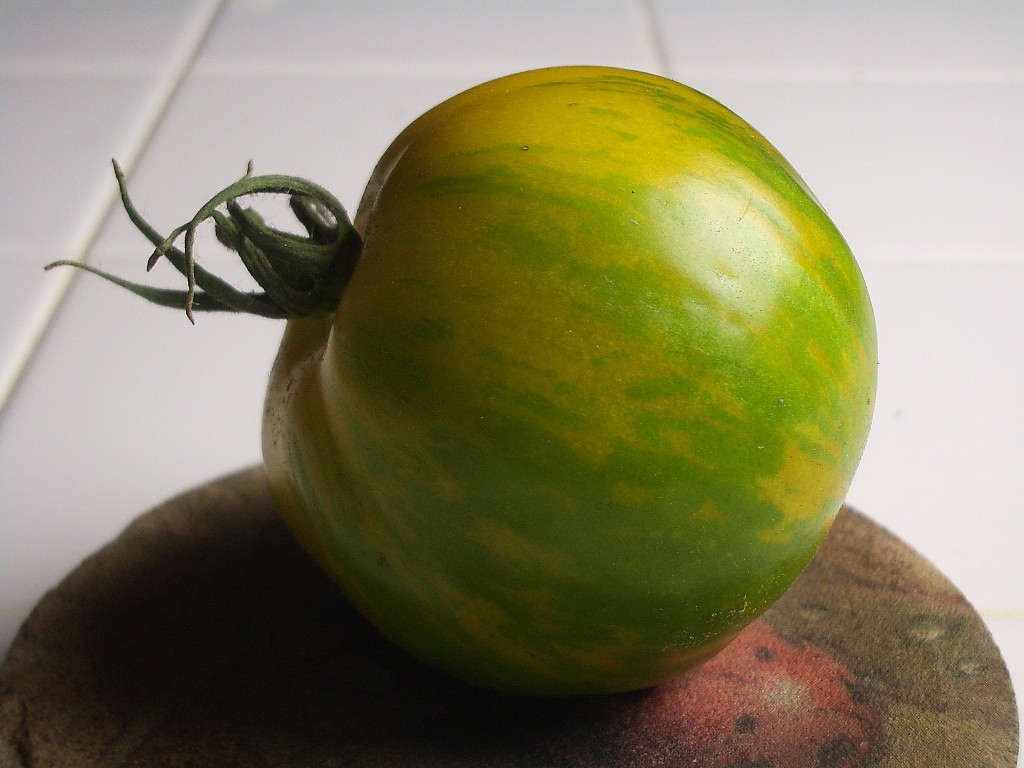
- Green Zebra

Tomato (Solanum lycopersicum)
- Maturity: 78 days
- Type: Open pollinated
- Vine: Indeterminate
- Plant height: 2.8 m
- Fruit weight: 170 g
- Leaf: Regular leaf
- Color: Bicolor: Green with yellow stripes
- Shape: Globe

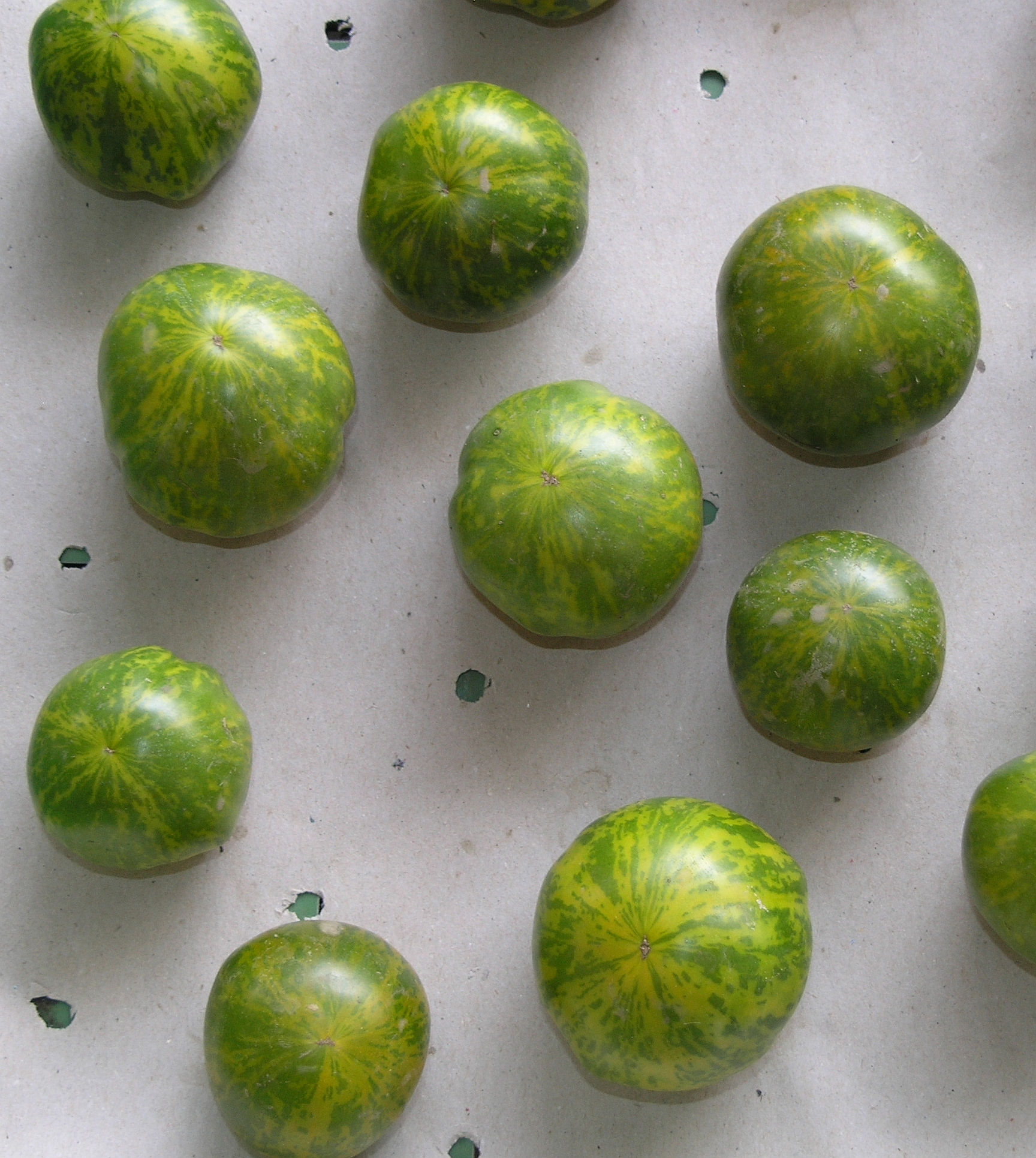
Green Zebra tomatoes

Green Zebra is a tomato cultivar with characteristic dark green and yellow stripes. Newer variations blush reddish instead of yellow when ripe. It is more tart (described as 'spicy' and 'zingy') than a regular tomato, and it is an early cultivar. Compared to other tomato varieties, it can produce somewhat mealy fruits depending on growing conditions.

Green Zebra was bred by Tom Wagner of Everett, Washington, and introduced in his Tater-Mater Seed Catalog in 1983. He first came up with the idea in the 1950s. Usually, green tomatoes are considered unripe and discarded or fried. However, Wagner was intrigued by the idea of a green tomato that was ready to eat.

There is some controversy as to whether Green Zebra should be considered an heirloom tomato. Some people do not consider it an heirloom quite yet, while others consider it either an heirloom, "modern heirloom" or "created heirloom".

== Classification ==
Common varieties include Green Zebra, Black Zebra, Big Zebra, and Red Zebra.

== Planting information ==
The Green Zebra tomato does not often obtain a disease; however, if the tomato has a disease the Green Zebra will not turn yellow, the plant will stay green until it wilts. The Green Zebra has a higher defense rate against diseases compared to other tomatoes. To grow this tomato one must plant seed 1–2 weeks after the temperature remains constant around 15-35 degrees Celsius. The soil should be well drained and the seed must remain 3 mm deep within the ground under full sunlight. Plant the seed 30 cm to 90 cm apart and harvest after 65–80 days. This plant is semi-annual and it is best to harvest in midsummer. One should transplant when the plant is 15 cm high.

== Determining ripeness ==
Because this tomato is green throughout its lifecycle, it can be difficult to tell when it is ripe. There are three main ripening stages. Different people have different preferences on which ripening stage is best to harvest during. The first stage is when the tomato reaches the normal firmness of a ripe tomato. Test this by gently grasping. Second, when the Zebra's light green stripes turn to yellow. Third, when the bottom of the yellow stripes begin to turn a blush color. For a sweeter tomato leave it on the vine for a longer period of time. However, leaving it on the vine for too long can cause it to become mealy.

== See also ==
- List of tomato cultivars
- Media related to Zebra tomatoes at Wikimedia Commons
