= Hillbilly tomato =

Tomato cultivar

The Hillbilly tomato is a cultivar of heirloom tomato originating in West Virginia in the 1800s. There is also a potato-leaf variant named Hillbilly Potato Leaf. The fruit is considered a beefsteak tomato weighing 1-2 pounds. It is round, heavily ribbed and its skin and flesh is orange-yellow with red streaks. The flavor is described "sweet and fruity" and is low in acid.

The Hillbilly tomato plant stands anywhere from 52"-84" tall when fully established, needing 85–94 days of growth before it reaches its full maturity. The plant is a low maintenance crop and does not require extra attention as long as it is planted properly, particularly after any season of frost. It requires full sun with a minimum of six hours daily. This plant also requires water but is drought tolerant, and mulching can help to ensure an even supply of moisture to the tomato plant. There are some problems that may occur with the hillbilly tomato plant which include pests and diseases. You can control some of these problems by crop rotation.

== See also ==
- List of tomato cultivars
