= The Stripey Badger =

Pub in Swindon, England

Coordinates: 51.5541°N 1.7356°W

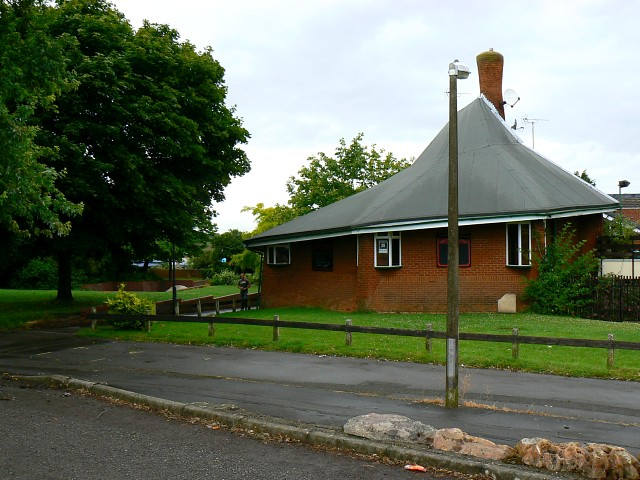
The Stripey Badger

The Stripey Badger is a Grade II listed pub in Eldene, an eastern suburb of Swindon, Wiltshire, England. Originally known as The Crumpled Horn, it was designed by Roy Wilson-Smith on the theme of the nursery rhyme "This Is the House That Jack Built" and built in 1975.

The pub received notoriety after being the scene of gangland violence on Friday 10 March 2023 when three people armed with machetes entered the pub to carry out a targeted attack. On 14 March 2023, a closure order for the pub was issued by Swindon Magistrates on the request of Wiltshire Police after the landlady, Jane Jeapes, was implicated in facilitating the sale and distribution of drugs from the premises.

Following a change of ownership and extensive renovation, the pub reopened on 17 October 2025 under its new identity of The Stripey Badger.
