= Stars & Stripes =

Stars & Stripes or Stars and Stripes may refer to:

== United States ==
- Flag of the United States, nicknamed Stars and Stripes
- United States men's national soccer team, also nicknamed Stars and Stripes
- United States women's national soccer team, also nicknamed Stars and Stripes

=== Military ===
- Stars and Stripes (newspaper), government-supported newspaper of the United States Armed Forces
- USS Stars and Stripes (1861)

== Arts and entertainment ==
- Stars and Stripes trilogy, a collection of three alternate history novels by Harry Harrison
- Stars and Stripes (ballet), choreographed by George Balanchine in 1958
- Stars and Stripes (professional wrestling), a World Championship wrestling tag team

=== Music ===
- Stars & Stripes (Aaron Tippin album), 2002
- Stars & Stripes (Kenny Garrett album), 1995
- Stars & Stripes (EP), a 2008 EP by SOJA
- Stars and Stripes Vol. 1, 1996 album by The Beach Boys
- "Stars 'n' Stripes", a song by Grant Lee Buffalo from Fuzzy
- Stars and Stripes, American Oi! band and side project of Jack Kelly from Slapshot

== Other uses ==
- Stars & Stripes (America's Cup syndicate), a series of America's Cup competitors
- Stars and Stripes Stakes an American Thoroughbred horse race at Arlington Park

== See also ==
- Stars and Stripes Forever (disambiguation)
