= Journal of Planning Education and Research =

- Discipline: Planning
- Language: English
- Edited by: Clinton J. Andrews, Frank Popper

Publication details
- History: 1981–present
- Publisher: SAGE Publications on behalf of the Association of Collegiate Schools of Planning
- Frequency: Quarterly
- Impact factor: 2.328 (2017)

Standard abbreviations
- ISO 4: J. Plan. Educ. Res.

Indexing
- ISSN: 0739-456X (print); 1552-6577 (web)
- LCCN: 84645933
- OCLC no.: 8399085

Links
- Journal homepage; Online access; Online archive

The Journal of Planning Education and Research is a peer-reviewed academic journal that publishes papers in the field of planning. The editors-in-chief are Clinton J. Andrews and Frank Popper. The journal was established in 1981 and is published by SAGE Publications in association with the Association of Collegiate Schools of Planning. It focuses on topics such as planning practice, planning theory, and planning pedagogy and publishes articles reporting original and current research, commentaries, and book reviews.

== Abstracting and indexing ==
The journal is abstracted and indexed in Scopus and the Social Sciences Citation Index. According to the Journal Citation Reports, its 2017 impact factor is 2.328, ranking it 16th out of 57 journals in the category "Planning & Development".
