= Cream soup =

Soup made with cream

A cream soup is a soup prepared using cream, light cream, half and half, or milk as a key ingredient. Sometimes the dairy product is added at the end of the cooking process, such as after a cream soup has been puréed.

A cream soup will often have a soup base, prepared with ingredients such as onion, celery, garlic powder, celery salt, butter, bacon drippings, flour, salt, pepper, paprika, milk, light cream, and chicken stock or vegetable stock. Various vegetables or meats are then added to the base. Sometimes, leftover vegetables and meats are used in cream soups.

== List of cream soups ==
A multitude of notable cream soups exist, including, but not limited to the following listed below.

Image	Name	Description
A cup of bisque at a restaurant	Bisque	Heavy cream soups traditionally prepared with shellfish, but can be made with any type of seafood or other base ingredients
Bobó de camarão	Bobó de camarão	A chowder-like Brazilian dish of shrimp in a purée of manioc (or cassava) meal with coconut milk and other ingredients.
Corn chowder with avocado and lime	Chowder	Often prepared with milk or cream, fish chowder, corn chowder, and clam chowder are especially popular in the North American regions of New England and Atlantic Canada.
Clam chowder prepared with whole clams	Clam chowder	Any of several chowder soups containing clams and broth, many regional variations exist, but the two most prevalent are New England or "white" clam chowder, a cream-based chowder, and Rhode Island/Manhattan "red" clam chowder, which is typically prepared without a cream base.
Corn chowder with shrimp	Corn chowder	Basic corn chowder ingredients comprise corn, onion, celery, milk or cream and butter.
Cream of asparagus soup	Cream of asparagus soup	Asparagus, a light chicken or vegetable stock and milk or cream are primary ingredients.
Cream of Broccoli	Cream of broccoli soup	Primary ingredients are broccoli, stock and milk or cream. Mass-produced commercial varieties of cream of broccoli soup are produced by various food manufacturers, such as the Campbell's.
Cream of chicken soup	Cream of chicken soup	Mass-produced in a condensed soup form, various non-commercial and homemade variations also exist
Cream of wild mushroom	Cream of mushroom soup	A simple soup where a basic roux is thinned with cream or milk and then mushrooms and/or mushroom broth are added. In America, the Campbell Soup Company began producing its well-known condensed "Cream of Mushroom Soup" in 1934.
Cream of spinach soup	Cream of spinach	With spinach as a main ingredient, additional ingredients can include onion, green onion, carrot, celery, tomatoes, potatoes, lemon juice, olive oil, seasonings, salt and pepper. Spinach soup is typically served hot, but can also be served as a cold soup.
A shrimp chowder	Cream of shrimp	Sometimes prepared as a cream soup, pictured is a shrimp chowder.
Cream of tomato soup	Cream of tomato	Cream of tomato soup is made with tomatoes as the primary ingredient and cream or milk as an ingredient. It may be served hot or cold in a bowl, and may be made in a variety of ways.
Crème Ninon	Crème Ninon	A soup with stock, purée of green peas and dry champagne, flavoured with lemon and dry sherry and topped with whipped cream.
She-crab soup	She-crab soup	A rich soup similar to a bisque, made of milk or heavy cream, crab or fish stock, Atlantic blue crab meat, and (traditionally) crab roe, a small amount of dry sherry added as it is plated.
	Soup du Barry	A soup made from cauliflower, potatoes, and veal stock, often including cream.

Additional cream soups include cream of cauliflower, cream of fennel, cream of potato, cream of corn, cream of walnut, cream of roasted pumpkin, cream of celery and cream-of-anything soup.

== Gallery ==
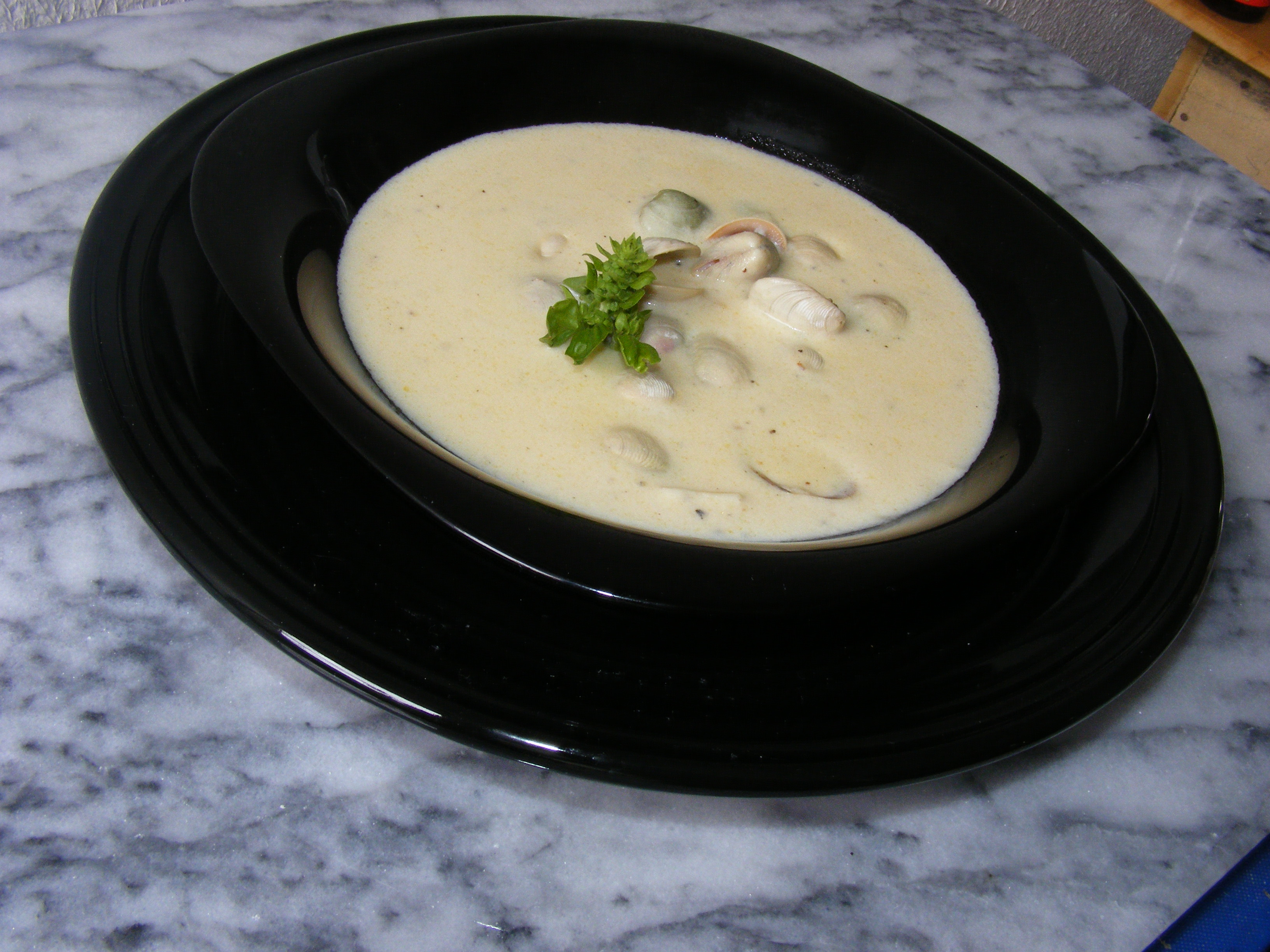
Cream of clams soup

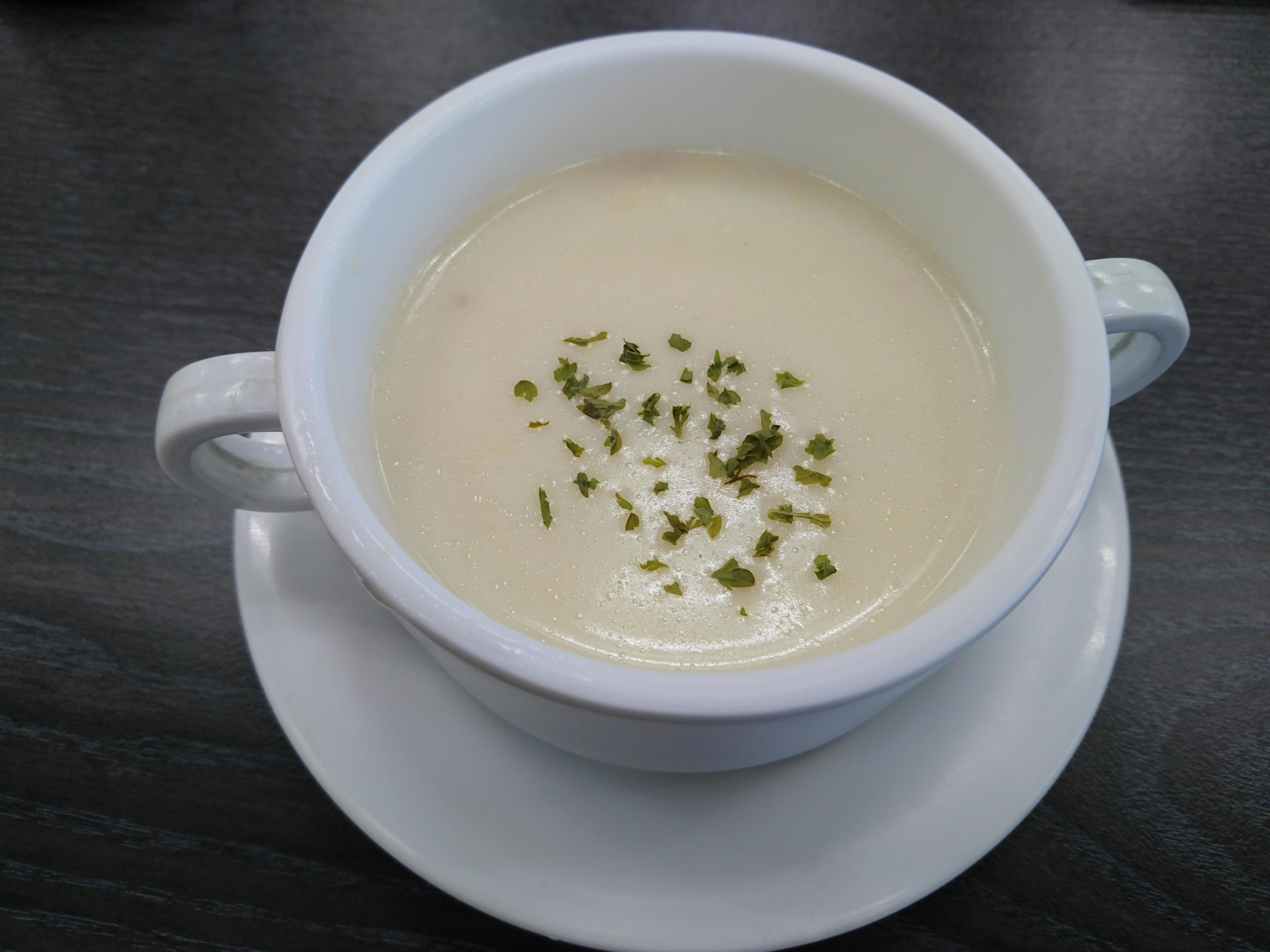
Cream of corn soup

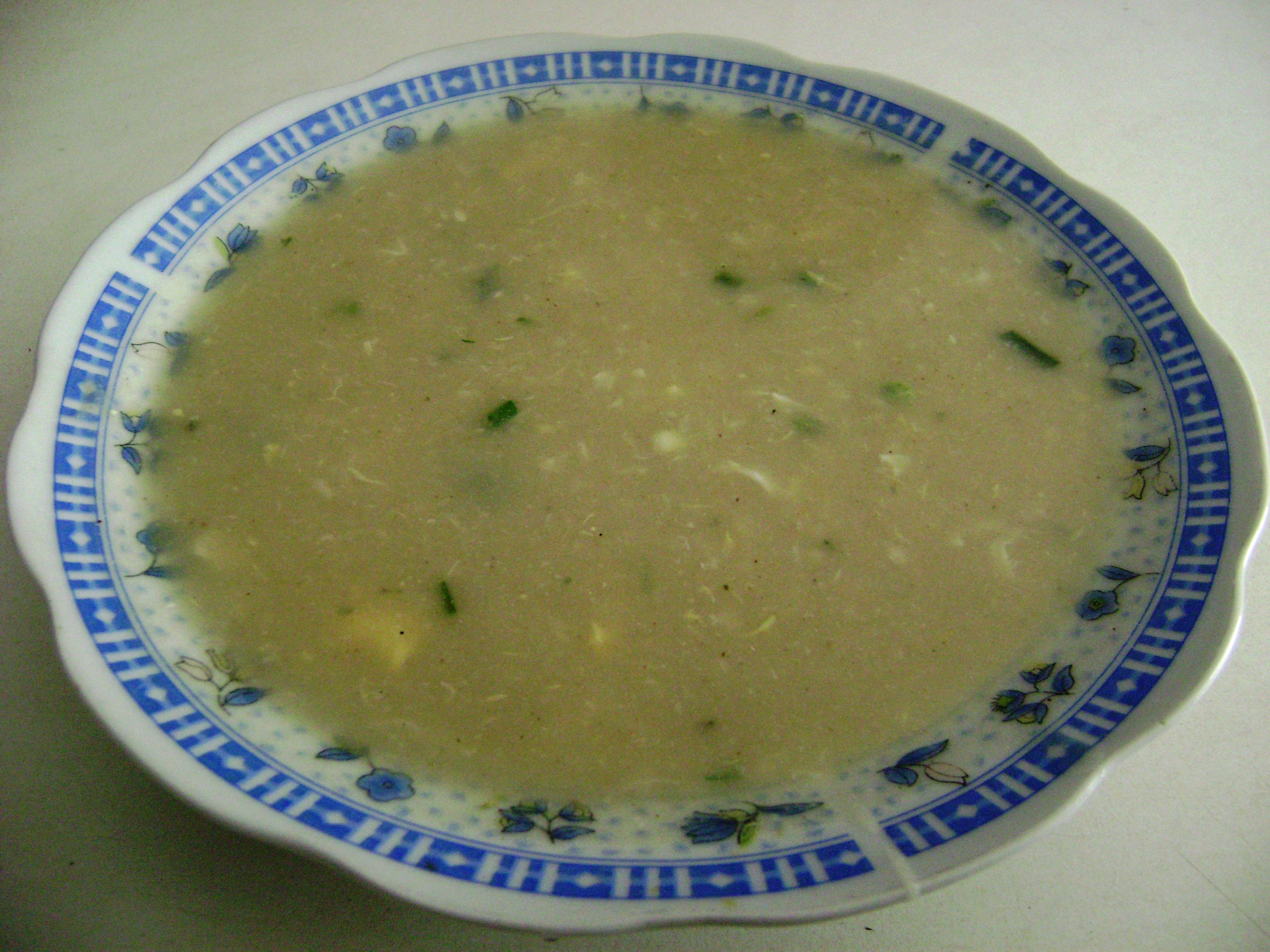
Cream of fava beans soup

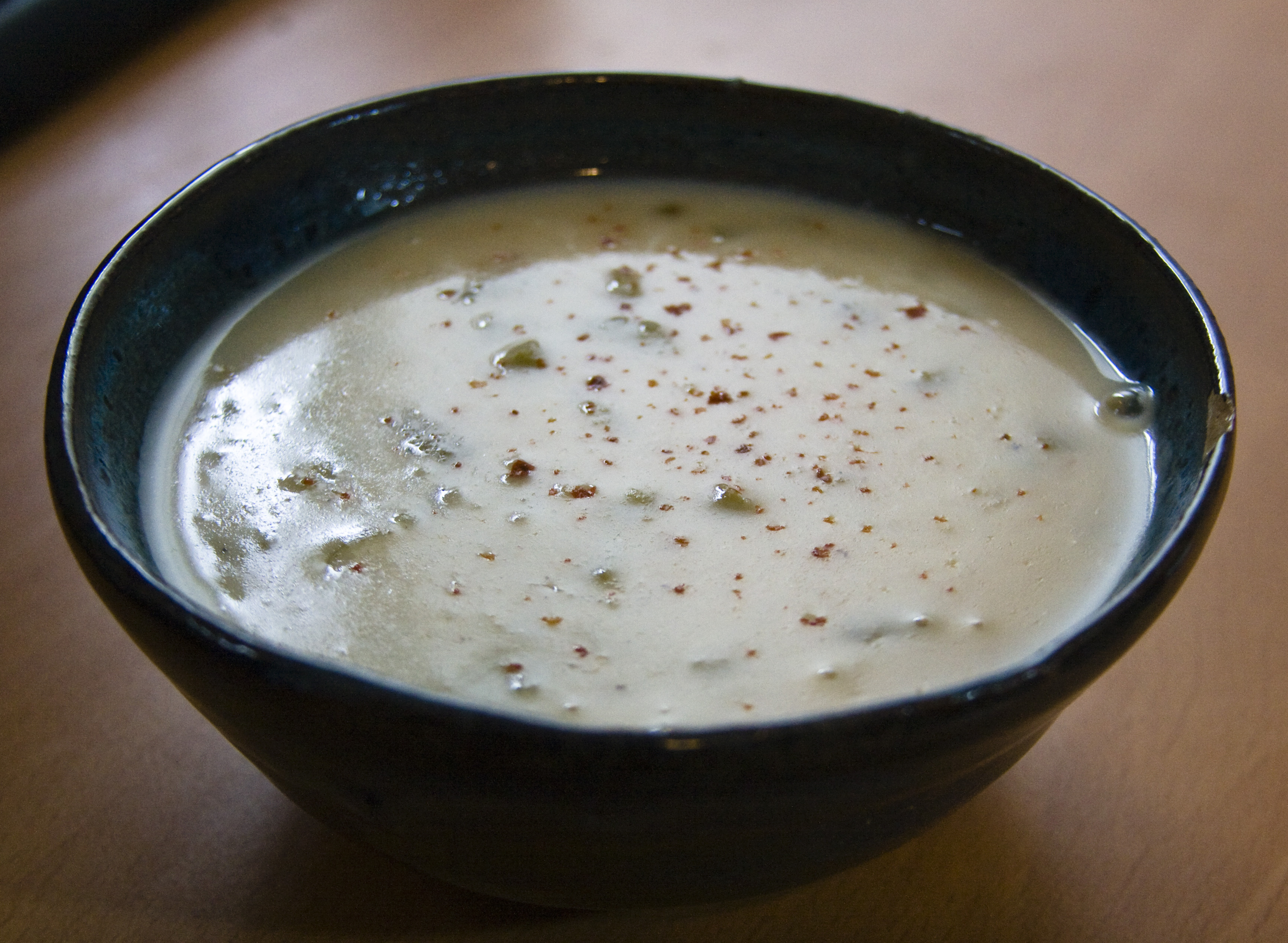
Cream of potato soup

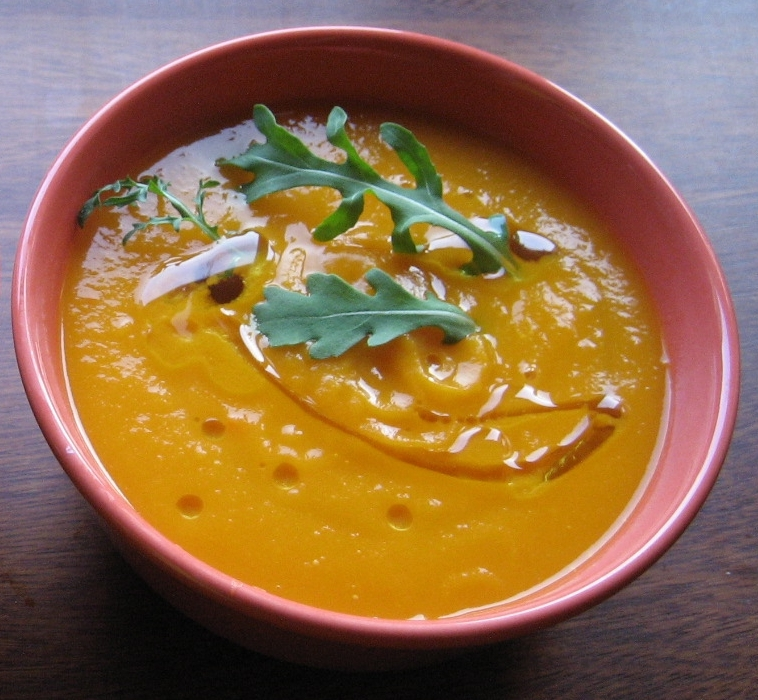
Cream of roasted pumpkin soup

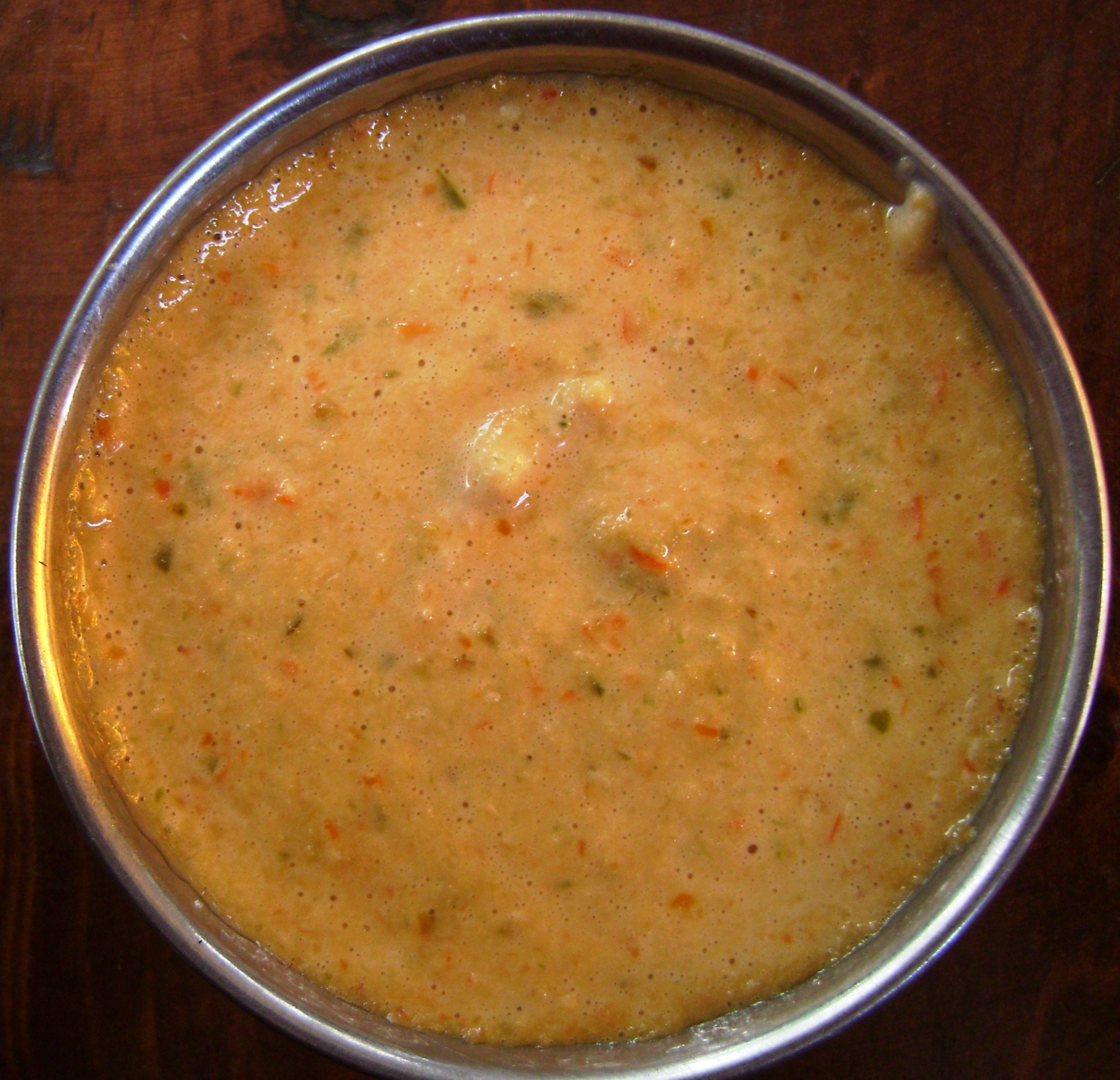
Cream of rocoto soup

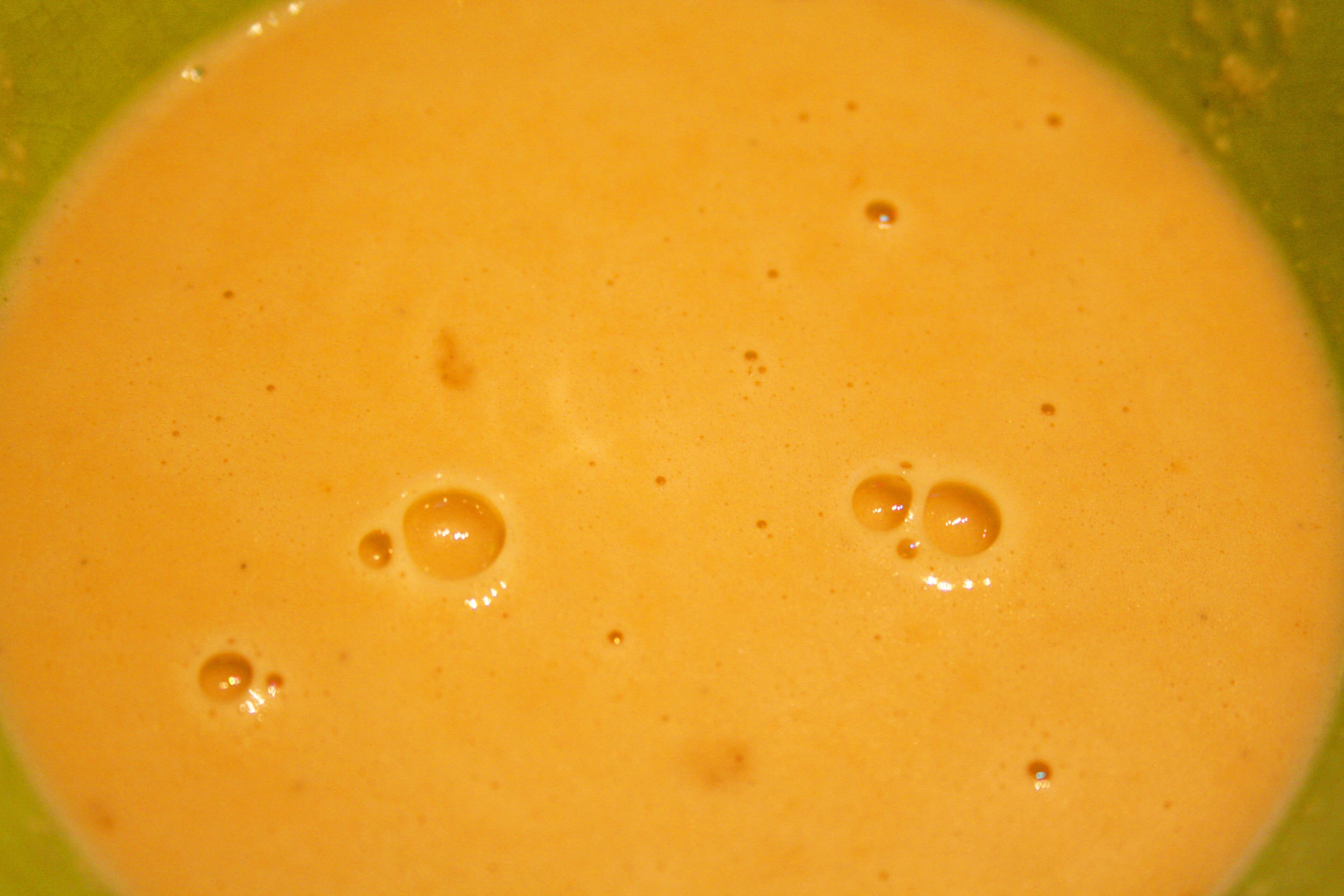
Cream of walnut soup

== See also ==
- Creamed corn
- List of soups
