= Crème Ninon =

French soup

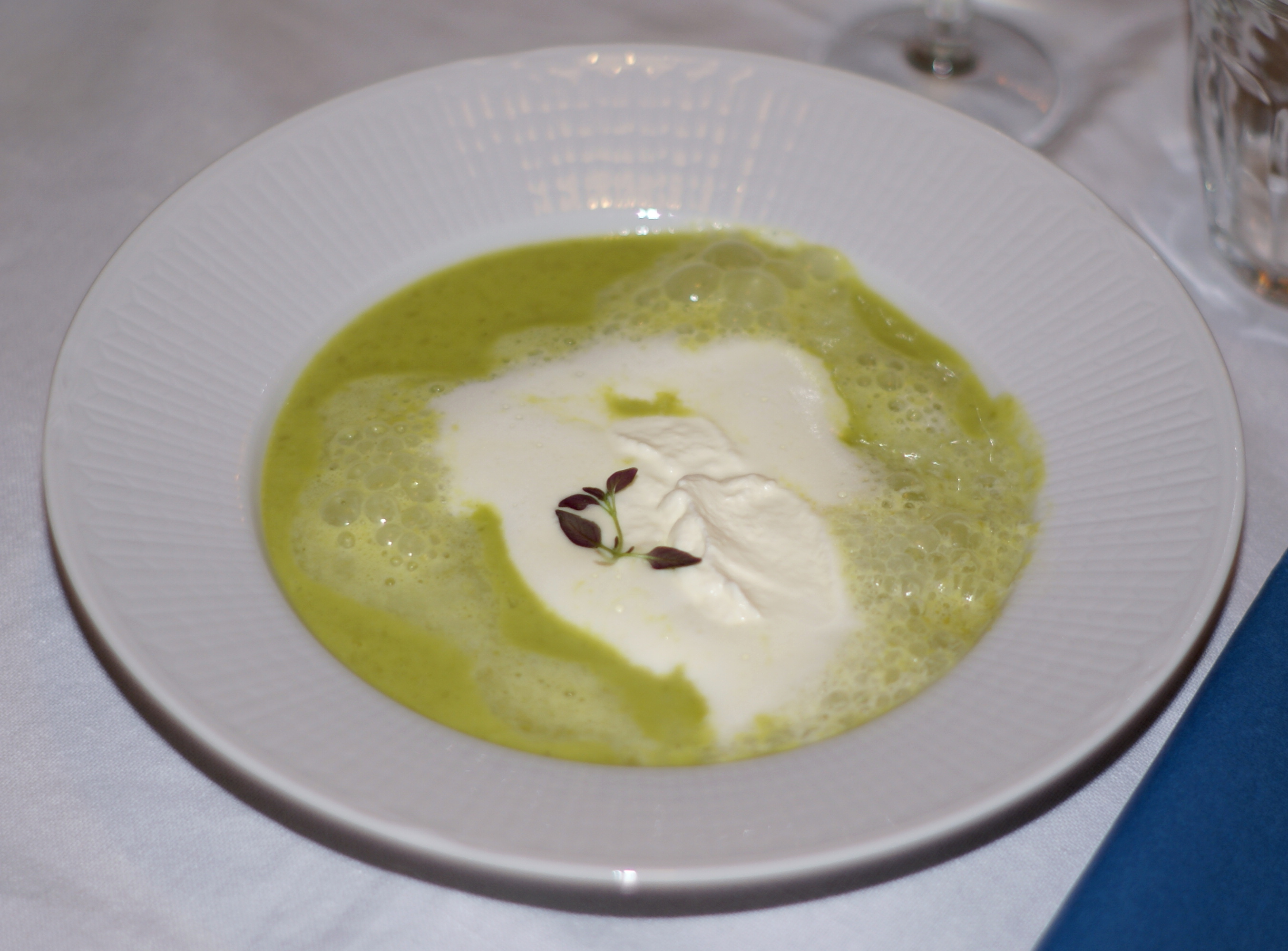
- Type: Soup
- Course: First
- Place of origin: France
- Associated cuisine: French cuisine
- Main ingredients: stock (purée of green peas and dry champagne), lemon, dry sherry

Crème Ninon is a soup with a base of a heavy stock purée of green peas and dry champagne. It is flavoured with lemon and some dry sherry, as well as salt and pepper. Just before serving it is topped with some whipped cream and champagne.

== See also ==
- List of soups
