= Bouillon (soup) =

Haitian soup

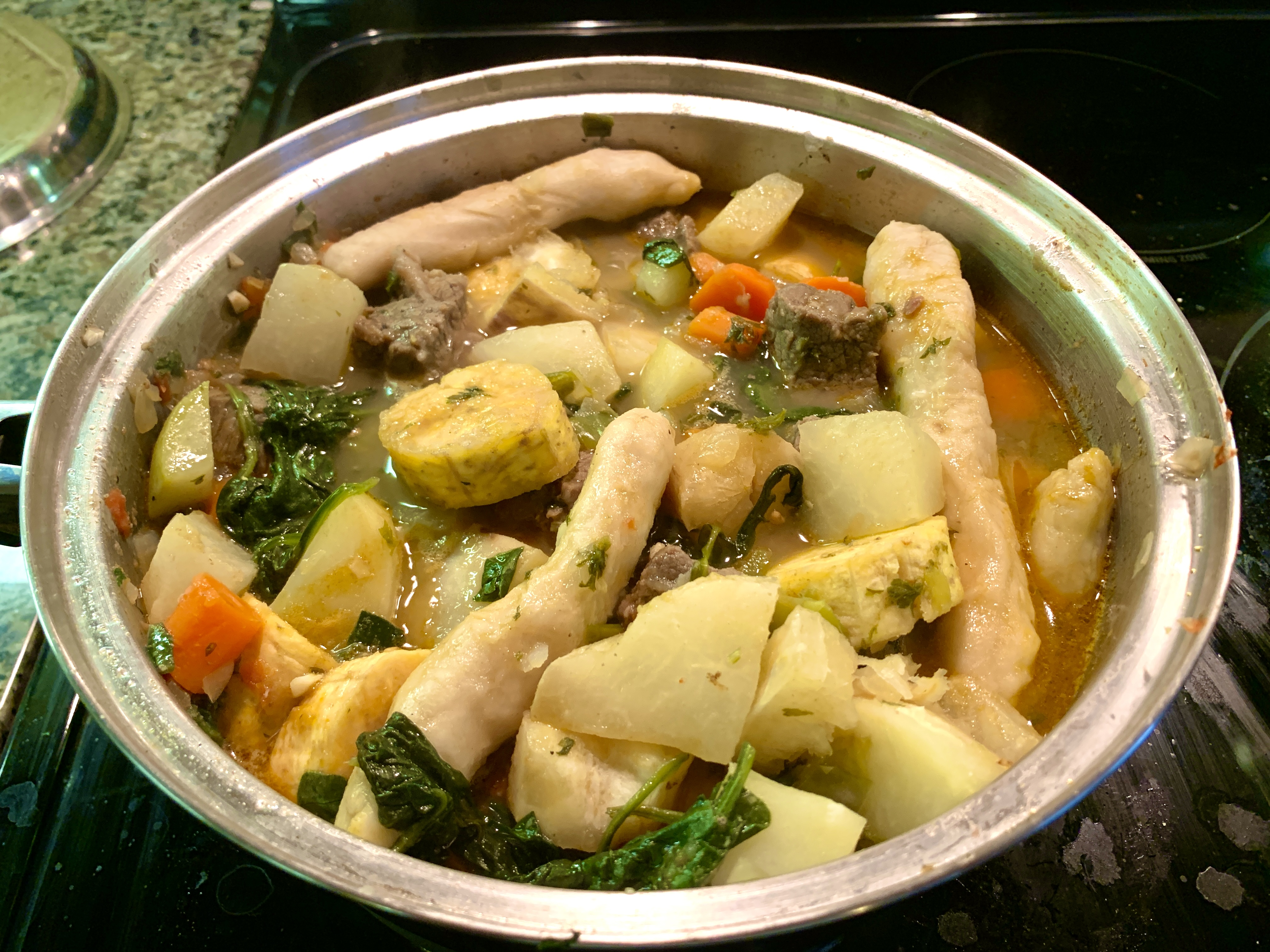
- Bouyon bèf, or beef bouillon
- Type: Soup
- Place of origin: Haiti
- Main ingredients: Meat, potatoes, plantains, yams, spinach, cabbage, celery, watercress

Bouillon (Haitian Creole: bouyon; /ˈbuːjɒn/) is a Haitian soup. This name comes from the French verb bouillir, meaning to boil. It is made with sliced meat, potatoes, sliced plantains, yam, spinach, watercress, cabbage, and celery (other ingredient variations exist), and cooked as a mildly thick soup.

== See also ==
- List of soups
- Soup joumou
- Plantain soup
