= Plantain soup =

Plantain soup dish

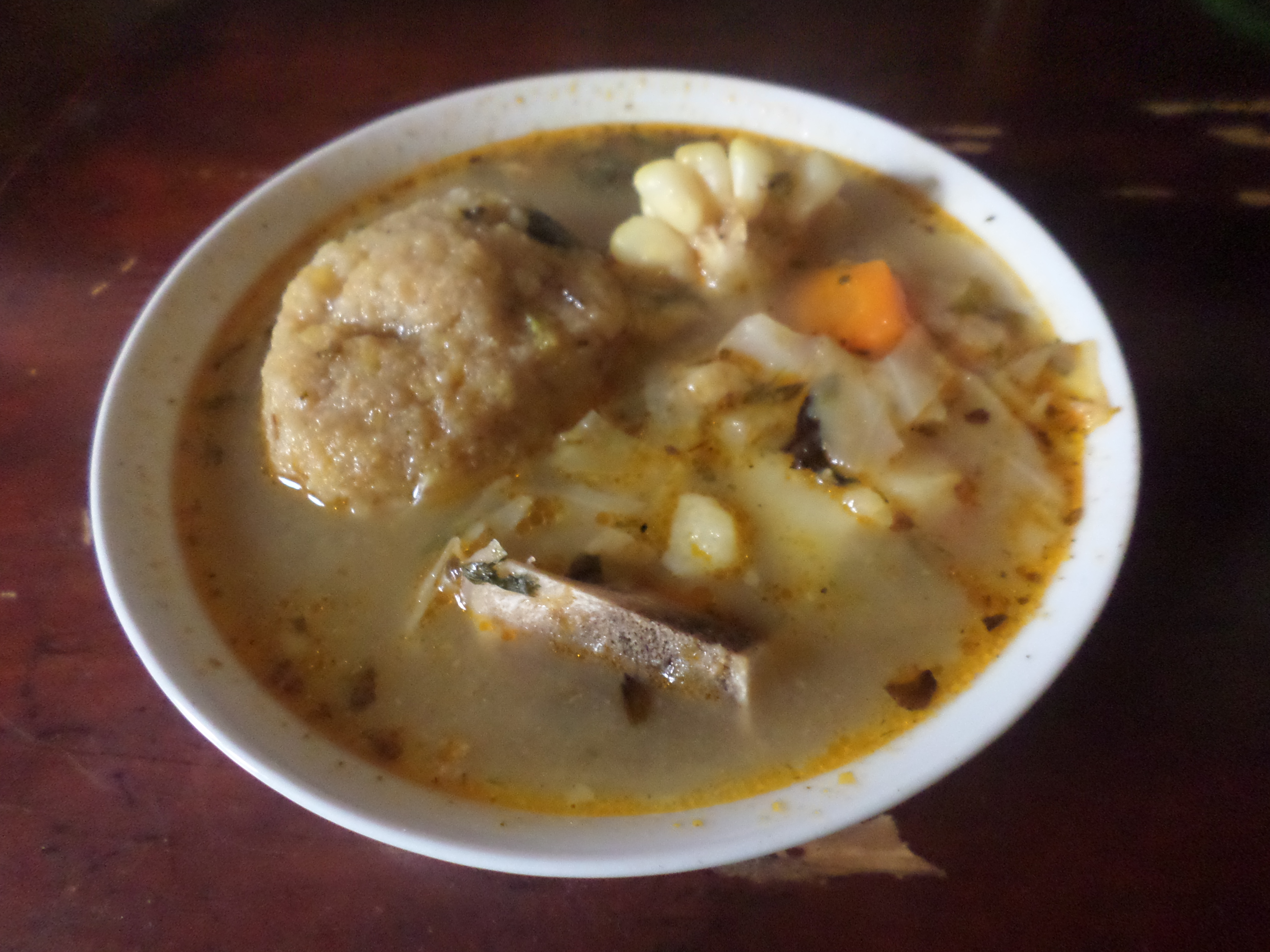
- Type: Soup
- Place of origin: Latin American
- Region or state: Colombia

Plantain soup is eaten in various cuisines. In Colombian cuisine, the dish is known as sopa de patacón (fried plantain). There is also sopa de platanos (plantain soup) in Latin American cuisine including Cuban cuisine and Puerto Rican cuisine.

Caldo de bolas de verde (green plantain dumpling soup) is from coastal Ecuador. The dumplings (balls) are made from green plantains stuffed with meat and vegetables. The beef broth includes corn and yuca.

Aguají is a rustic Dominican plantain soup.

Mohinga is a Burmese soup made with banana/plantain stem.

In Puerto Rico the soup is called sopa de plátano (plantain soup) and crema de plátano (plantain cream), and is made with a ratio of three green plantains to one yellow plantain. They are cooked in sofrito, spices, broth, and milk, and the cooked mixture is then pureed. The soup is similar in texture and appearance to chowder and cream soup, and is topped with cheese.

== See also ==
- List of soups
- Mofongo
