= Apple soup =

Soup prepared using apples as a primary ingredient

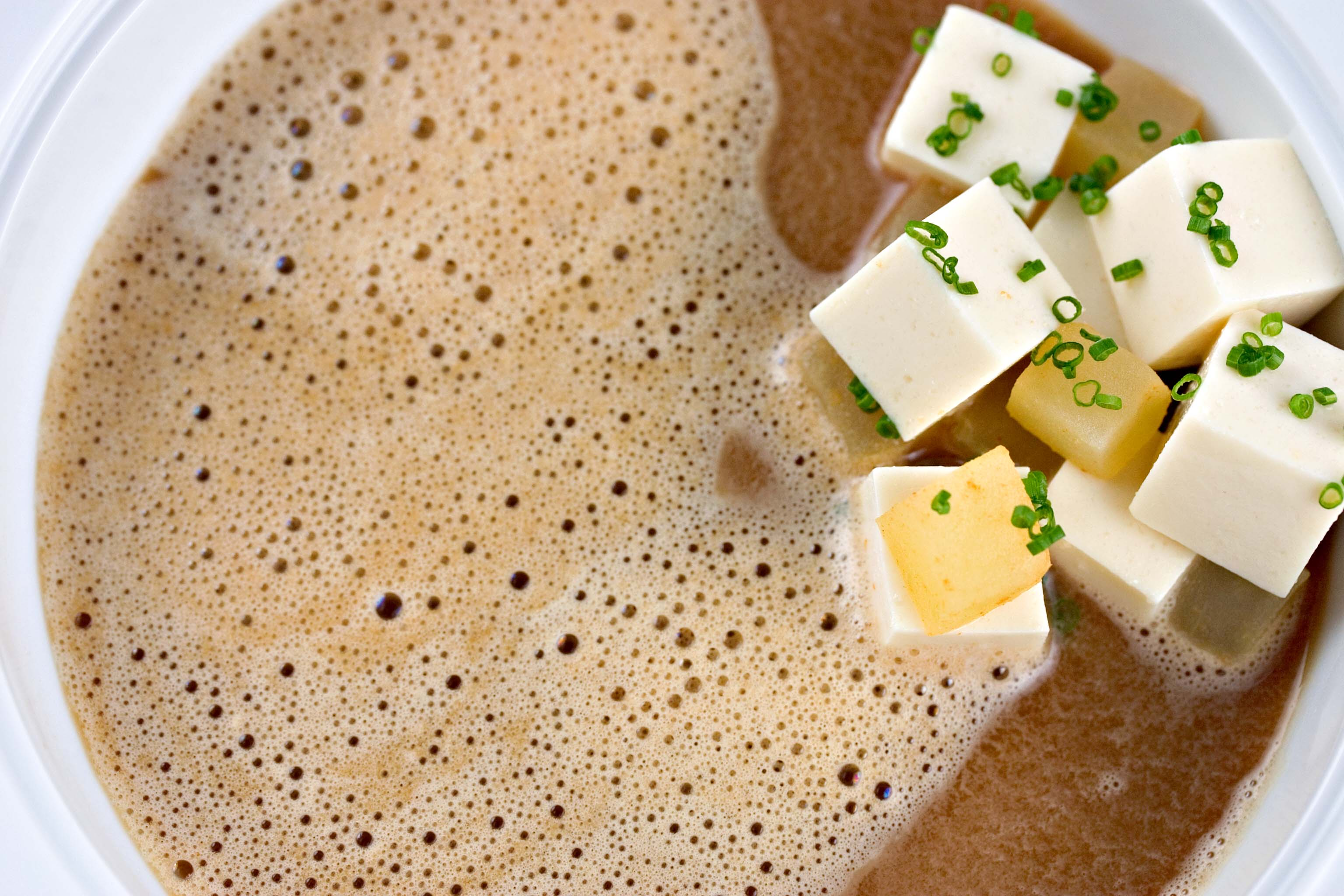
- An apple soup with kimchi and cheddar tofu
- Type: Soup
- Course: Appetizer
- Main ingredients: Apples, onions, chicken or vegetable broth or water or apple cider

Apple soup is a soup prepared using apples as a primary ingredient. The apples can be puréed, sliced, or boiled and used whole. Onions, carrots, parsnip and pumpkin are used in some preparations. Some recipes use chicken or vegetable broth or stock, while some others use water or apple cider. Additional ingredients can be added according to taste, such as cinnamon, lemon juice, sugar, ginger, curry powder, salt and pepper. It is sometimes served as an appetizer.

Apple soup has been used as a dish to feed the sick, as occurred circa the early 1900s in the United States.

== Gallery ==
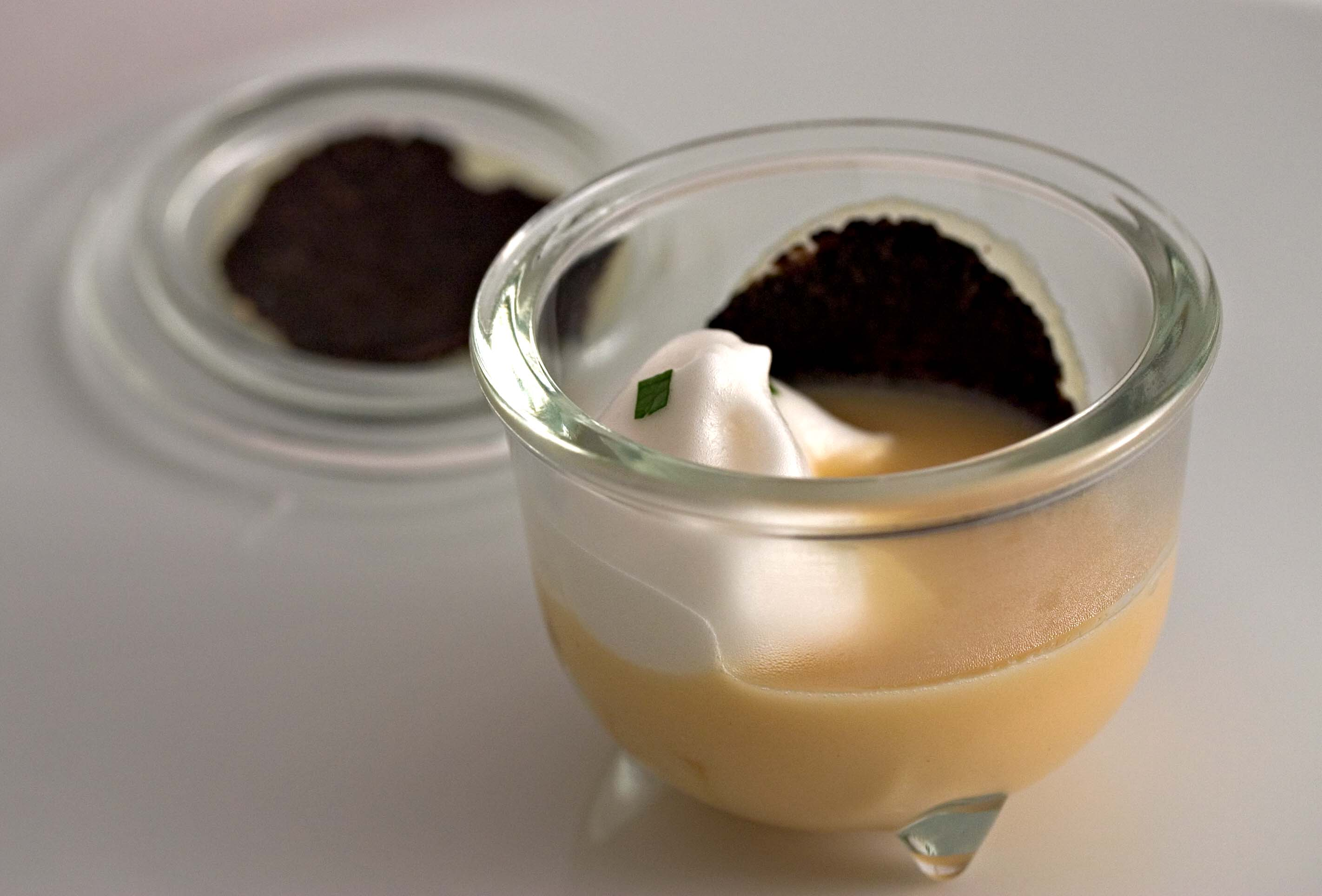
Apple soup with truffle

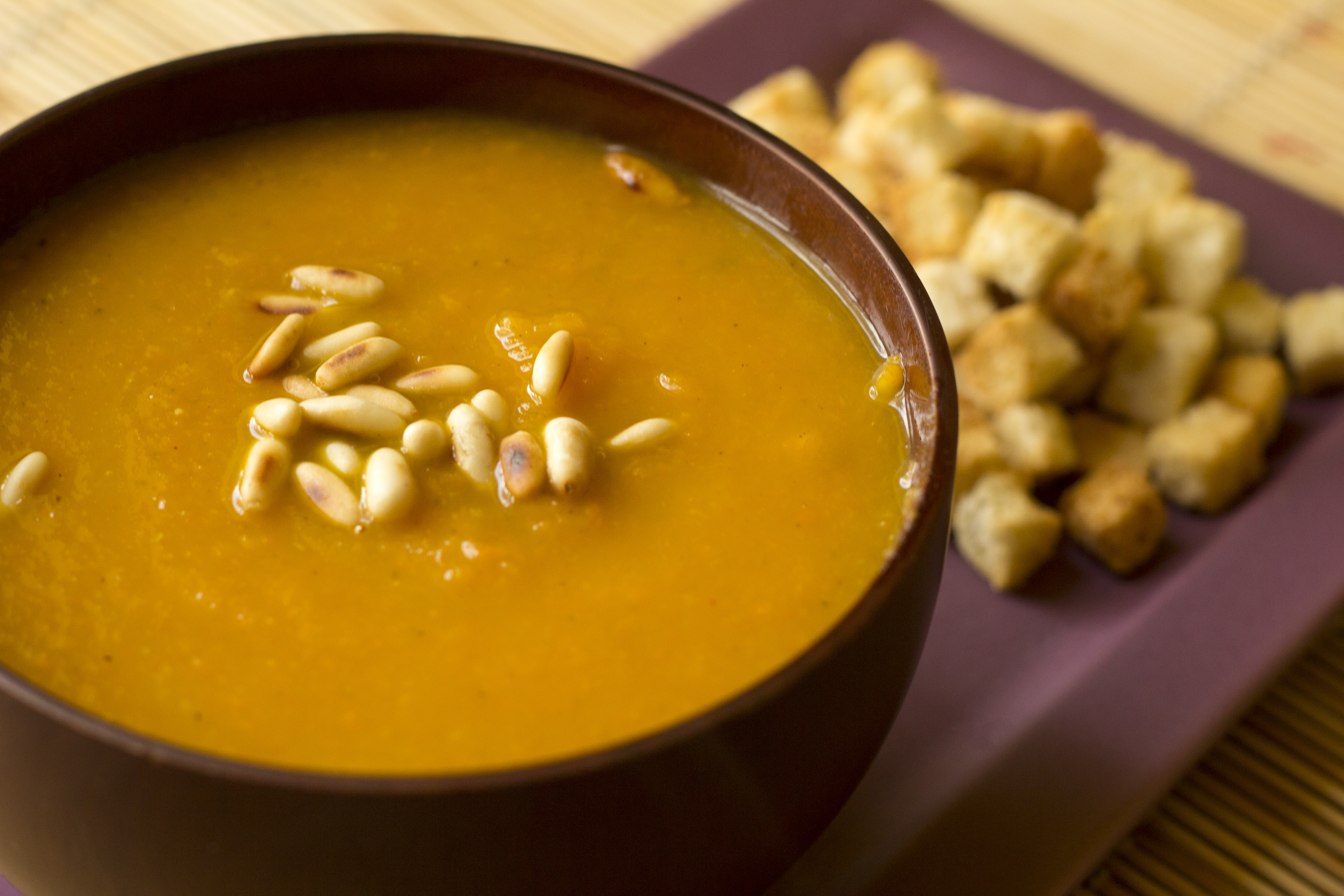
An apple and carrot soup

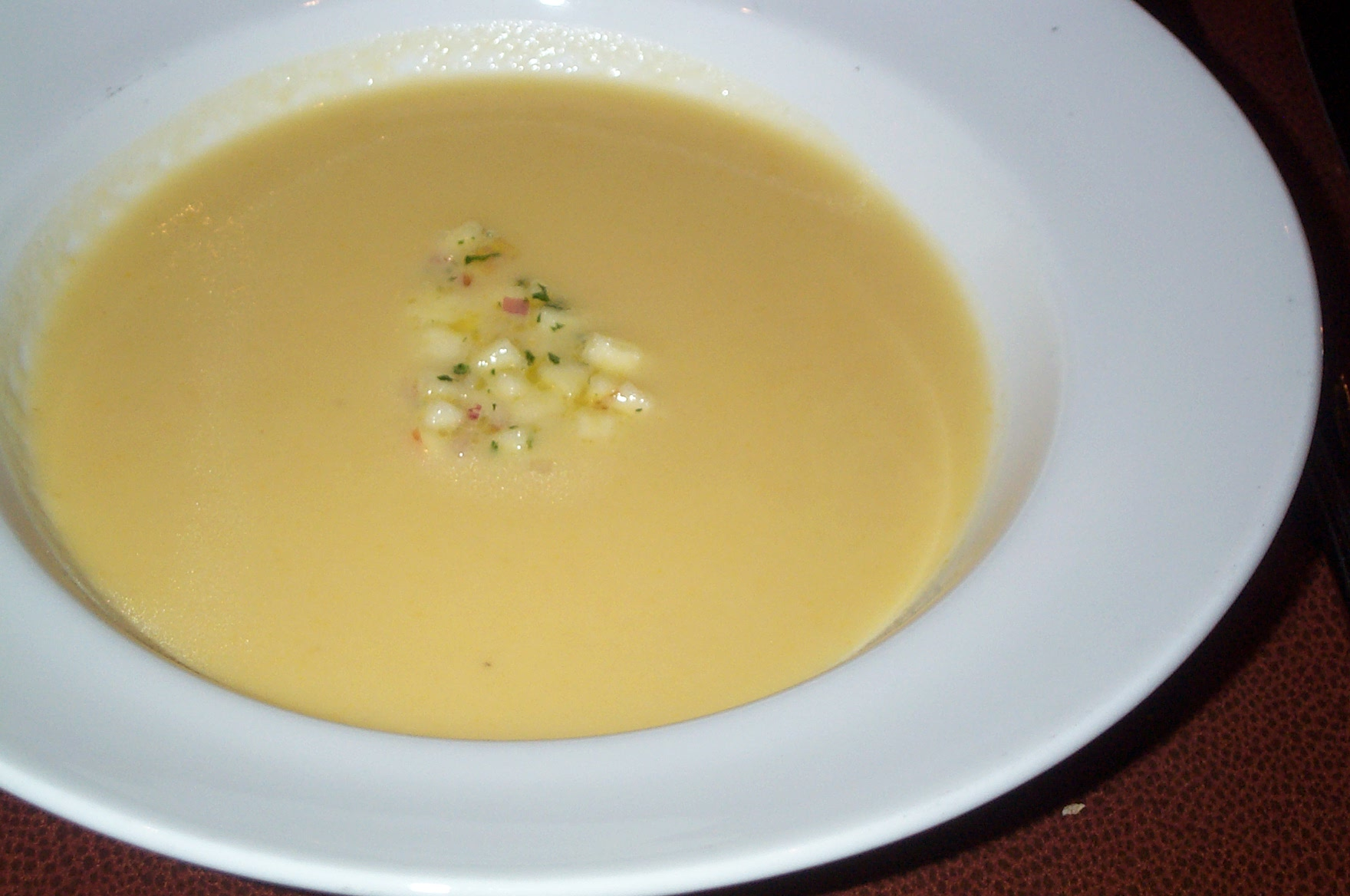
An apple and parsnip soup topped with apple relish

== See also ==
- List of soups
