= Caldo Xóchitl =

Chicken and vegetable soup in Mexican cuisine

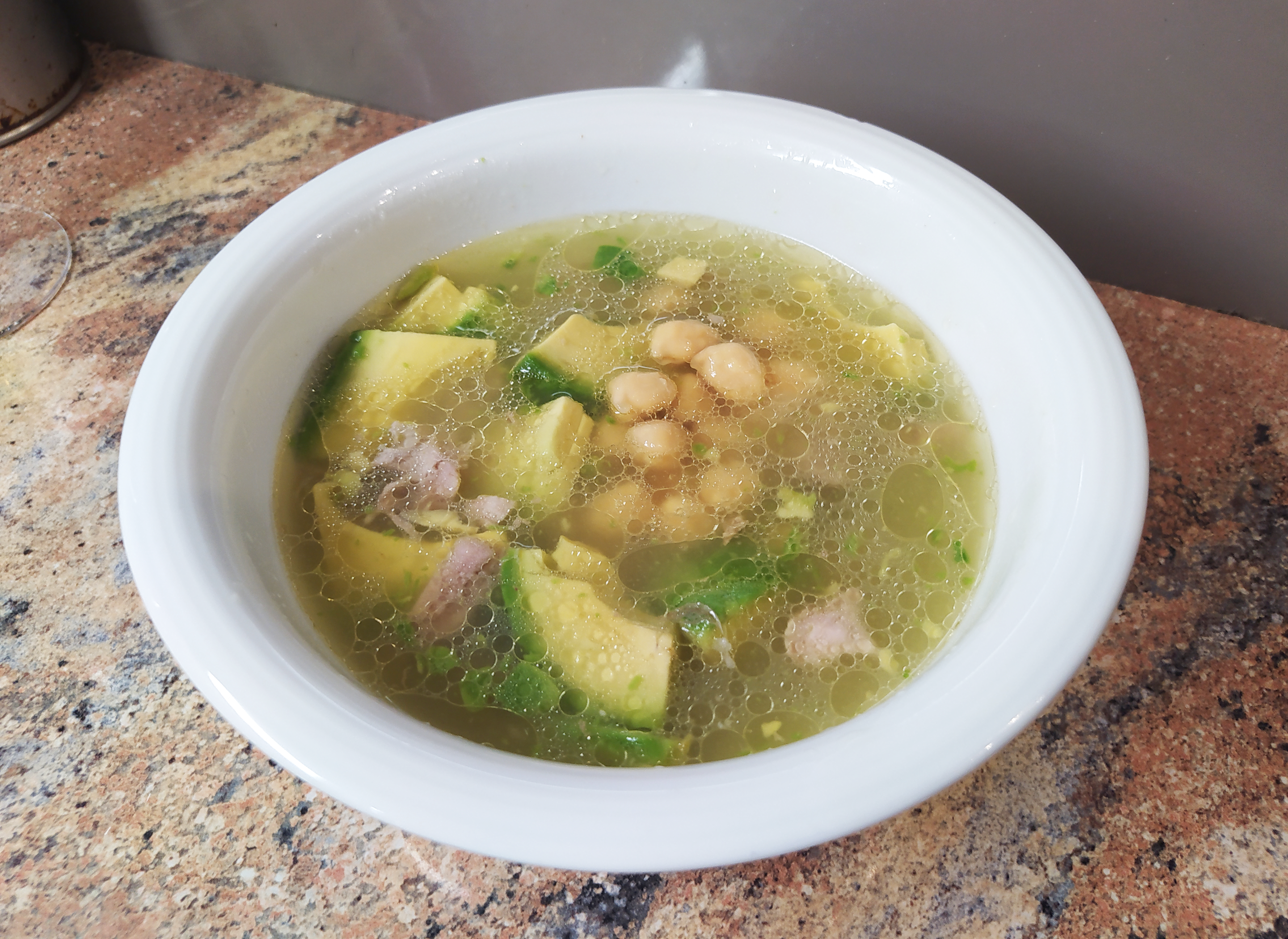
- Course: Soup
- Place of origin: Mexico
- Main ingredients: Chicken meat, chickpeas, avocados, chicken broth

Caldo Xóchitl is a simple consommé of Mexican origin with a vast multitude of variants, although, in essence, it is an enriched chicken broth with rice, chickpeas, avocado, and chicken, and usually flavored with garlic, cilantro or epazote; onion, chili, tortilla chips, and tomato are frequently also included. It is served with lemon,and sometimes with green chili and chopped onion on the side.

The origin of the name is unknown, perhaps in honor of its creator, since xóchitl (/ˈsotʃitɬ/) is a traditional name among Mexicans, meaning "flower" in Nahuatl.

== See also ==
- Mexican cuisine
- Caldo tlalpeño
- Tortilla soup
