= List of soups =

This is a list of notable soups. Soups have been made since ancient times.

Some soups are served with large chunks of meat or vegetables left in the liquid, while others are served as a broth. A broth is a flavored liquid usually derived from boiling a type of meat with bone, a spice mix, or a vegetable mix for a period of time in a stock.

A potage is a category of thick soups, stews, or porridges, in some of which meat and vegetables are boiled together with water until they form a thick mush.

Bisques are heavy cream soups traditionally prepared with shellfish, but can be made with any type of seafood or other base ingredients. Cream soups are dairy based soups. Although they may be consumed on their own, or with a meal, the canned, condensed form of cream soup is sometimes used as a quick sauce in a variety of meat and pasta convenience food dishes, such as casseroles. Similar to bisques, chowders are thick soups usually containing some type of starch.

Coulis were originally meat juices, and now are thick purées.

While soups are usually heated, some soups are served only cold and other soups can optionally be served cold.

== Soups ==
Name	Image	Origin	Type	Distinctive ingredients and description
Abula (soup)		Yorubaland	Smooth	Beans (including locust beans), ewedu, chili peppers, potash and other vegetables blended into water until smooth.
Aguadito		Peru	Chunky	Peruvian green soup usually made with cilantro, carrot, peas, potatoes and can have chicken, hen, mussels or fish. It also contains ají amarillo (yellow chili pepper) and various other vegetables and spices. The green color is due to cilantro. It is known for having a potential for easing or alleviating symptoms associated with the hangover.
Ajiaco		Colombia	Chunky	In the Colombian capital of Bogotá, ajiaco is typically made with chicken, three varieties of potatoes, and the Galinsoga parviflora herb commonly referred to in Colombia as guascas. In Cuba, it is a hearty stew made from beef, pork, chicken, vegetables, and a variety of starchy roots and tubers classified as viandas.
Açorda	Açorda à Alentejana	Portugal	Chunky	A typical Portuguese dish composed of thinly sliced bread with garlic, large amounts of finely chopped coriander, olive oil, vinegar, water, white pepper, salt and poached eggs.
Acquacotta		Italy	Chunky	Originally a peasant food, historically, its primary ingredients were water, stale bread, onion, tomato, olive oil and any spare vegetables or leftovers. It has been described as an ancient dish.
Aloo tama		Nepal	Chunky	Fermented bamboo shoots, potato, and black-eyed peas in a broth
Amish preaching soup		United States	Chunky	Typically served preceding or following Amish church services. Some versions are prepared with beans and ham hocks.
Analı kızlı soup		Turkey	Chunky	Bulgur meatballs and chickpeas in gravy with yogurt
Ant egg soup		Laos, Northeastern Thailand	Chunky	A soup including ant eggs among its ingredients. Served hot.
Apple soup			Typically smooth	Any number of soups that use apple as a primary ingredient, usually with vegetables, spices, and broth.
Ash-e doogh		Iran, Azerbaijan, Turkey	Potage	A yogurt soup that consists of yogurt and leafy vegetables. Served hot.
Aush, aash, āsh		Iran, Afghanistan, Turkey, Caucasus	Potage	A variety of thick soups, served hot - with many different types of recipes and regional differences.
Avgolemono		Greece	Potage	Chicken broth, rice or orzo, and lemon, thickened with tempered eggs
Avocado soup				Can be prepared and served as a cold or hot soup
Bacon soup		Europe	Chunky	Bacon, vegetables, and a thickening agent. Pictured is celery and bacon soup.
Bak kut teh		Indonesia, Malaysia and Singapore	Herbal	Consists of meaty pork ribs simmered in a complex broth of herbs and spices (including star anise, cinnamon, cloves, dang gui, fennel seeds and garlic) for hours.
Bakso		Indonesia	Meatballs soup	Meatball noodle soup in rich beef broth, sometimes include bok choy, noodles, tofu, hard-boiled egg, fried shallots and wontons.
Barley			Chunky	Barley, vegetables, and broth
Batchoy		Philippines	Noodle soup	A Filipino noodle soup made with pork offal, crushed pork cracklings, chicken stock, beef loin and round noodles.
Beef noodle soup		East Asia	Noodle	Stewed or red braised beef, beef broth, vegetables and Chinese noodles. It exists in various forms throughout East Asia and Southeast Asia, and is popular as a Chinese and Taiwanese noodle soup.
Beer soup		Europe	Beverage soup	Recipe from the Middle Ages using heated beer and pieces of bread; though other ingredients were also used.
Bergen fish soup		Norway	Fish	White fish (haddock, halibut, cod) and various vegetables in a heavy cream
Bermuda fish chowder		Bermuda	Chowder	Fish, tomato, onion, other vegetables, served with black rum and "sherry peppers". The national dish of Bermuda.
Bilo-bilo		Philippines	Dessert	A Filipino dessert soup made of small glutinous balls (sticky rice flour rounded up by adding water) in coconut milk, sugar, jackfruit, saba bananas, various tubers, and tapioca pearls.
Binakol		Philippines	Chicken	A Filipino chicken soup made from chicken cooked in coconut water with grated coconut, green papaya (or chayote), leafy vegetables, garlic, onion, ginger, lemongrass, and patis (fish sauce).
Binignit		Philippines	Dessert	Coconut milk, glutinous rice, fruits, root crops, and tapioca pearls, served hot but sometimes chilled
Bird's nest soup		China	Gelatinous	Edible bird's nest, an expensive delicacy valued for its unusual texture
Black sesame soup		China	Dessert	A sweet soup containing powdered black sesame seeds and rice, typically served warm
Blåbärssoppa (Blueberry soup)		Nordic countries	Smooth	A sweet, thick soup made from bilberries (European blueberries) which is popular in Sweden, Finland, and Iceland. Can be served hot or cold.
Bob chorba		Bulgaria	Bean	Dried beans, onions, tomatoes, chubritza (summer savoury) or dzhodzhen (spearmint), carrots
Borscht/ Borshch		Eastern Europe	Chunky	Cabbage and beet-based soup with meat. May be served hot or cold. A national Ukrainian dish and wide spread Belarusian, Polish (with mushrooms instead of cabbage, served on the Christmas Eve) and Russian dish.
Bouillabaisse		France	Fish	A type of fish soup from Provençal, France.
Bouillon		Haiti		Sliced meat, potatoes, sliced plantains, yam, cabbage, and celery. Traditionally prepared on Saturdays
Bouneschlupp		Luxembourg		Green beans, potatoes, bacon and onions.
Bourou-Bourou		Greece (Corfu)	Potage	Vegetable and pasta
Bread soup		Germany	Bread	Stale bread in a broth
Brenebon		The Netherlands and Indonesia	Beans	Kidney bean soup served in pig's trotters broth, spiced with shallot, garlic, salt, sugar, pepper, nutmeg and clove. Mixed with chopped green beans, celery and scallion.
Brown Windsor soup		England	Chunky	Lamb or beef steak, parsnips, carrots, leeks, bouquet garni, Madeira wine; popular in England during the Victorian and Edwardian eras
Bun bo Hue		Vietnam	Noodle	A noodle soup from central Vietnam, with beef.
Buridda		Italy (Liguria)	Chunky	Seafood soup or stew.
Butajiru (Tonjiru)		Japan	Chunky	Pork and vegetable soup, flavored with miso.
Butternut soup		South Africa	Smooth	Vegetable soup, made with butternut.
Cabbage soup, kapusniak, kapustnica, zelnacka		Poland; Slovakia; Russia; Ukraine; Czech Republic	Chunky	Sauerkraut, meat
Cacciucco		Italy		Seafood soup or stew.
Caldillo de congrio		Chile	Eel	Conger eel heads, garlic, onion, coriander, carrots, pepper, chopped tomatoes, cream, boiled potatoes, and conger meat.
Caldillo de perro		Spain (southern)	Seafood	Seafood, hake, garlic, olive oil, lemons, and Seville oranges. It is customarily served with sour orange juice.
Caldo de pollo		Latin America	Chunky	Whole cuts of chicken, halved potatoes, cabbage leaves, and other large preparations of vegetables.
Caldo de queso		Hermosillo, Sonora, Mexico	Chunky	Potatoes, onions, tomato, green chiles, and oregano are simmered in broth. Cubes of cheese (usually queso ranchero, queso fresco or queso cotija are added to the broth at the end of cooking, flavoring the broth and giving the cheese a gummy, chewy texture.
Caldo galego		Galicia, Spain	Chunky	Cabbage and other greens simmered with potatoes, white beans, and cuts of pork such as belly, ham, bacon, or chorizo.
Caldo tlalpeño		Mexico	Chunky	A chicken soup with chickpeas, carrots, onion, green beans, and garlic flavored with epazote, cumin, and chipotle.
Caldo verde		Portugal and Brazil	Chunky	Potatoes, thinly sliced kale, with slices of chouriço added before serving.
Callaloo		Caribbean	Chowder	Taro leaf or other leafy greens, usually with pork or crab added for flavor. The greens referred to as callaloo vary from island to island depending on availability.
Canh chua		Vietnam	Fish	A fish soup from southern Vietnam, made sour with tamarind.
Canja de Galinha		Portugal, Brazil, Cape Verde	Chunky	Chicken, pasta and lemon, particularly popular in the states of Minas Gerais and Goiás
Carp soup		Czech Republic	Fish	Carp's head and offal, onion and vegetable. Part of traditional Czech Christmas Eve dinner.
Carrot soup				Prepared with carrot as a primary ingredient, it can be prepared as a cream-style soup and as a broth-style soup.
Cazuela		Latin America	Chunky	Clear broth, rice, potato, squash or pumpkin, corn and chicken or beef. Eaten in South America and Spain, it combines native and introduced ingredients. Pictured is an Ecuadorian cazuela.
Česnečka		Czech Republic, Slovakia	Brothy	A thin garlic soup with sliced potatoes, typically served with fried bread cubes
Chestnut bisque		France	Bisque	Chestnuts are a primary ingredient.
Chicken noodle soup			Noodle	Chicken, stock, noodles, such as egg noodles
Chicken soup			Clear or Stock	Made from chicken simmered with various other ingredients. Pictured is southern Chinese style chicken soup with mushrooms and corn.
Chicken vegetable soup			Vegetable soup	Chicken, stock, onion, green beans, carrots, potato
Chorba, shorba		Balkans, North Africa, Central Europe, Eastern Europe, Central Asia, Middle East, Indian subcontinent	Stock	Regionally recipes are made in different ways, but most all are a thinner, broth soup.
Chupe		Peru	Chowder	Thin, milky seafood soup, also referred to as Chupe de Mariscos
Chupe Andino		Andes		Refers to various soups and stews that are prepared in Andes Mountains region of South America
Cioppino		San Francisco, California	Fish	Fish stew with tomatoes and a variety of fish and shellfish (Italian-American)
Clam chowder		United States (New England)	Chowder	Thick soup made of clams, potatoes, salt pork and onions
Cockchafer soup		Europe	Smooth or brothy	Cockchafer insects are fried and then simmered in stock, typically served with slices of veal liver or dove breast, and croutons
Cock-a-leekie		Scotland	Chunky	Leek and potato soup made with chicken stock
Coconut soup			Chunky	Coconut or coconut milk
Cold borscht / Šaltibarščiai		Lithuania	Cold (chilled)	Beetroot (or sometimes tomato), popular in Eastern Europe. A Lithuanian specialty, usually made in summer time in one variety, almost always cold. Based on beets, usually served with either hot boiled or fried potatoes.
Consommé		France	Clear or Stock	A type of clear soup made from broth or stock.
Corn chowder		United States (New England)	Chowder	Similar to New England clam chowder, with corn substituted for clams in the recipe
Crab bisque		France	Bisque	Crab stock and heavy cream
Cream of apple soup			Cream	Granny Smith apples, stock, cream, spices
Cream of asparagus			Cream	Onions, asparagus, chicken broth, heavy cream
Cream of broccoli			Cream	Broccoli, stock, and milk or cream as primary ingredients
Cream of celery			Cream	
Cream of chicken			Cream	Mass-produced in a condensed soup form, various non-commercial and homemade variations also exist
Cream of potato			Cream	
Cream of tomato			Cream	
Cream of crab		United States(Eastern Maryland)	Cream	Pictured is Maryland cream of crab soup.
Cream of mushroom			Cream	
Crème Ninon		France	Bisque	Base of a heavy stock purée of green peas and dry champagne
Cucumber soup			Cold (chilled)	Cucumber soup is known in various cuisines.
Cullen skink		Scotland	Fish	Smoked haddock, potatoes, onions and cream
Curry Mee		Indonesia and Malaysia	Noodle	Thin yellow noodles or/and string thin mee-hoon (rice vermicelli) with spicy curry soup, chilli/sambal, coconut milk, and a choice of dried tofu, prawns, cuttlefish, chicken, egg, mint leaves and cockle.
Dalithoy		India (Konkan region)	Hot, Vegetable	Soup made with split yellow lentils and spices. It is a Konkani staple that is often served over rice.
Dashi		Japan	Cold (chilled)	Clear fish stock made with kombu (sea kelp) and katsuobushi (smoked bonito flakes). Dashi broth is often used as a base for miso soup and other Japanese soup broths.
Dillegrout		England	Stew	Chicken pottage made with almond milk, sugar, and spices traditionally presented at coronations of English monarchs by the lord of the manor of Addington.
Dinengdeng		Philippines	Fermented	A dish of the Ilocano people of the Philippines, similar to pinakbet. It is classified as a bagoong monamon (fermented fish) soup-based dish.
Duck soup noodles		Malaysia	Noodle	The dish consists of ingredients such as duck meat in hot soup with mixed herbs and Bee sua served in particular at Penang hawker centres.
Edikang ikong		Nigeria (Cross River and Akwa Ibom States)	Chunky	A variety of meat products including beef, bushmeat, cow tripe, dried fish, crayfish, periwinkle, leaf vegetables, and palm oil
Egg drop soup		China	Noodle	Savory soup made by pouring beaten eggs into swirling boiling water or broth
Egusi soup		Nigeria	Chunky (Medicine)	A soup thickened with Egusi, the culinary name for various types of seeds from gourd plants, like melon and squash.
Ezogelin soup		Turkey	Chunky	Savory soup made by red lentil, bulgur, onion, garlic, salt, olive oil, black pepper, hot pepper and peppermint
Escudella		Spain (Catalonia)	Stew	A traditional Catalan meat and vegetable stew and soup. Typically during Christmas celebrations.
Fabada Asturiana		Spain (Asturias)	Chunky	Dried large white beans (fabes de la Granja, soaked overnight before use), shoulder of pork (lacón) or bacon (tocino), black pudding (morcilla), chorizo, and saffron (azafrán)
Fanesca		Ecuador	Fish	Cod soup
Fish soup bee hoon		Singapore	Fish/seafood	Seafood soup served with thin noodles called Bee hoon.
Fish Soup			Clear or Stock	
Fisherman's Soup		Hungary	Fish	Ηot and spicy river fish soup with a lot of hot paprika (Hungarian: Halászlé)
French onion soup		France	Potage	Deep, rich broth made with onions and beef. Often topped with croutons and gruyere cheese melted golden on top, over the edges of the bowl.
Frittatensuppe		Austria	Clear	Broth with crumbled slices of pancakes, also popular in South Germany and Switzerland (Pfannkuchensuppe, Flädlisuppe)
Fruktsoppa		Sweden	Dessert soup	Typically prepared using dried fruits, and typically served as a dessert dish. It may be served hot or cold.
Fufu and Egusi soup		Nigeria	Chunky	Vegetables, meat, fish, and balls of ground melon seed
Fumet		Europe	Clear or Stock	Fish stock, often concentrated and used as a base for sauces, and usually made with fish heads and bones
Garmugia		Italy (Lucca, Tuscany, central Italy)	Chunky	Primary ingredients include chicken or vegetable stock or broth, asparagus, artichoke hearts, fava beans, peas, onion and meats, such as pancetta and veal.
Gazpacho		Spain	Cold (chilled)	Pureed tomato and vegetables
Ginataan		Philippines	Chunky	Method of cooking using coconut milk. Due to the general nature of the term, it can refer to a number of different dishes, each called ginataan, but distinct from one another.
Ginestrata		Italy (Tuscany, Northern Italy)	Clear or stock	Thin, lightly spiced egg-based soup prepared with primary ingredients of egg yolks, chicken stock, and Marsala wine or white wine
Gising-gising		Philippines	Chunky	A spicy Filipino vegetable soup or stew traditionally made with chopped winged beans (sigarillas or sigarilyas), and coconut milk spiced with labuyo chili, garlic, onions, and bagoong alamang (shrimp paste).
Goat meat pepper soup		Nigeria		Common ingredients are goat meat, crayfish, Uziza, Negro Pepper (also called Uda Ewentia or Enge) and nutmeg, such as Calabash Nutmeg (also called Ehu or Ariwo).
Gogi guksu		South Korea (Jeju Province)		Pork and noodle soup
Gomguk		Korea	Chunky	Beef parts such as ribs, oxtail, brisket, ox's head or ox bones by slow simmering on a low flame. The broth of gomguk tends to have a milky color, with a rich and hearty taste.
Goulash		Hungary	Chunky	Meat (usually beef), paprika and vegetables (especially potatoes). Hungarian: gulyás translates roughly as cowboy
Ground nut soup		West Africa		Groundnuts, also known as peanuts
Kimchi guk		Korea	Chunky	Kimchi soup
Gumbo		United States (Louisiana)	Chunky	Creole soup from the American South, most popular in New Orleans. Often includes seafood, made with shrimp or crab stock and andouille sausage and thickened with a dark roux.
Guthuk		Tibet	Chunky	A thick soup eaten days before the Losar, the Tibetan New Year, made with various meats, vegetables, and leftover grains
Harira		Maghreb	Chunky	Popular as a starter but is also eaten on its own as a light snack. There are many variations and it is mostly served during Ramadan, although it can be made throughout the year.
Harqma		Maghreb	Chunky	A lamb stew, sometimes using lamb's trotters, often consumed during Ramadan.
Hot and sour soup		Asia	Chunky	Soups from several Asian culinary traditions. In all cases, the soup contains ingredients to make it both spicy and sour.
Ikan kuah kuning		Indonesia (Maluku, Papua)	Fish	Fish in a clear yellow broth. It is a side dish of papeda.
Inubaran		Philippines		A Filipino chicken stew or soup made with chicken cooked with diced banana pith, coconut milk (gata) or coconut cream (kakang gata), a souring agent, lemongrass, and various spices.
Íslensk Kjötsúpa		Iceland	Chunky	Meat soup made with lamb and vegetables
Joumou		Haiti	Chunky	Mildly spicy squash soup made with pieces of beef, potato, plantains and vegetables such as parsley, carrots, green cabbage, celery and onions. It is eaten every first of January in honor of Haitian independence in 1804.
Jusselle		Ancient Rome	Potage	Grated bread, eggs, sage and saffron cooked together in broth
Kadyos, baboy, kag langka		Philippines	Pork	Pigeon peas, ham hock, and jackfruit soured with batuan fruits (Garcinia binucao)
Kadyos, manok, kag ubad		Philippines	Chicken	Pigeon peas, chicken, and banana pith
Kangaroo tail soup		Australia	Chunky	An Australian adaptation of oxtail soup, eaten commonly in the country during the colonial period. Kangaroo tail soup was mass produced for export during the mid-20th century.
Kawlata		Malta	Brothy	A primarily vegetable soup made with cabbage and pork, eaten usually during the winter
Kesäkeitto		Finland	Chunky	Potatoes, carrots, peas, cauliflower and sometimes other seasonal vegetables cooked in milk and butter
Kharcho		Georgia	Chunky	Lamb, rice, vegetables and a highly spiced bouillon
Kusksu		Malta	Chunky	Kusksu is a traditional Maltese soup made primarily from seasonal broad beans, small pasta beads - known locally as kusksu - and fresh ġbejniet. Although similar is shape, kusksu pasta, which gives the soup its name, is "not to be confused with couscous".
Kwāti		Nepal	Chunky	Mixed soup of nine types of sprouted beans: black gram, green gram, chickpea, field bean, soybean, field pea, garden pea, cowpea, and rice bean
Laksa		Indonesia, Malaysia, Singapore	Noodle	A Peranakan noodle soup usually consisting of a spicy curried coconut broth or a tart broth. Additional ingredients may include meats, fish, tofu, vegetables and herbs.
Lagman		Uzbekistan	Chunky	Pasta, vegetables, ground lamb and numerous spices
Leek soup		Wales	Chunky	Leeks and often potatoes. Popular during St. David's Day. Pictured is leek and potato soup.
Lettuce soup				Lettuce is a primary ingredient. Some versions purée all of the ingredients together, and cream of lettuce soup is a type of lettuce soup.
Lentil soup			Chunky	Red, green, or brown lentils. Popular in the Middle East and Mediterranean area.
Linat-an		Philippines		Pork stew or soup from the Visayas and Mindanao islands of the Philippines that characteristically uses pork ribs (or other bony cuts of pork) simmered until very tender, lemongrass (tanglad), string beans, starchy ingredients for a thicker soup (usually taro), and various other vegetables.
Lobster stew		Spain	Chunky	Cream or stock-based soup with chunks of lobster
Lobster bisque		France	Bisque	Lobster stock, heavy cream, and sherry
Log-log		Philippines	Noodle	Egg noodle soup (regional variants include Kinalas, Batchoy)
Lohikeitto		Finland	Fish	Salmon, potatoes (other root vegetables can be added such as rutabaga, carrots, onions), cream, and dill
Lung fung soup		China	Snake	Snake, chicken, lemon, chili peppers, and other vegetables.
Lyvzha		Ossetia	Beef	Beef, potatoes, onion, garlic, carrots and thyme, etc.
Maccu		Italy (Sicily)	Chunky	Fava beans is a primary ingredient
Maki mi		Philippines	Noodle soup	A Filipino thick pork tenderloin soup originating from the Chinese-Filipino community of Binondo, Manila. It is made from lean pork pounded with a mallet until tender. It is marinated in soy sauce, garlic, black pepper, rice wine or vinegar, and onions before being covered with egg whites or starch (usually starch from corn, sweet potato or tapioca). It is then cooked in boiling beef stock, with beaten eggs dropped and stirred until they form strands. Egg noodles (mami) are also commonly added.
Mami soup		Philippines	Noodle soup	A popular Filipino noodle soup made with wheat flour noodles, broth and the addition of meat (chicken, beef, pork) or wonton dumplings.
Mandia peja		India		An Indian soup made with mandia (Finger millet) and rice.
Manhattan clam chowder		United States (Rhode Island)	Chowder	Tomato-based clam chowder
Marghi special		Africa (West Africa)	Brothy	A fish and vegetable soup seasoned with tamarind. Sorrel, spinach, tomatoes, and bean sprouts are common used.
Maryland crab soup		United States (Maryland)	Chowder	Vegetables, blue crab, and Old Bay Seasoning in a tomato base
Matzah ball soup		Jewish (Ashkenazi)	Chunky	Staple food on Passover. The Matzah ball dumplings are traditionally served in chicken broth with sliced carrots, garnished with chopped parsley. Matzo balls are also referred to as knaidel or knaedle.
Mee ka tee		Laos	Chunky	An egg drop soup with rice noodles, ground pork, and peanuts in a coconut milk broth flavored with red curry. It is garnished with fresh shredded cabbage, cilantro, green onions, beansprouts and mint.
Melon soup			Varies	Soup prepared with melon as a primary ingredient. Pictured is a soup with true melon.
Minestrone		Italy	Chunky	Vegetables and pasta
Miso soup		Japan	Fermented	Dashi stock base with dissolved miso paste (fermented rice, barley and/or soybeans). Common ingredients include tofu and seaweed.
Miyeok guk		Korea	Chunky	Seaweed soup from Korea, which is traditionally served to women who have just given birth, and people of all genders on their birthdays. Often with shrimp, sae-al shim (rice cake balls), or potato.
Mohinga		Burma	Fish	Chickpea flour and/or crushed toasted rice, garlic, onions, lemongrass, banana tree stem, ginger, fish paste, fish sauce, and catfish in a rich broth. Served with rice vermicelli.
Mote de queso		Colombia	Cheese	Made with ñame (yam) and Costeño cheese.
Mole de olla		Mexico	Chunky	Beef chuck and shank, xoconostle (a kind of edible cactus), chayote, zucchini, green beans, corn, potatoes, and cabbage in a broth flavored with a mole of ground guajillo and pasilla chiles, garlic, onion, and epazote. It is garnished with chopped serrano pepper and limes.
Mulligan stew		United States	Chunky	An improvised stew made by early 20th century hobos, typically made communally with whatever ingredients are available. Potatoes and onions were common, along with meat and other vegetables, sometimes canned, and whatever could be begged, scavenged, found or stolen.
Mulligatawny		India	Chunky	Meat, vegetables, and spices. Based on an Indian sauce recipe.
Naengmyeon		Korea	Cold (chilled)	Buckwheat noodles in a tangy iced beef broth, raw julienned vegetables, a slice of a Korean pear, and often a boiled egg and/or cold beef
Nettle soup			Chunky	Tender shoots of the stinging nettle, popular in Scandinavia and eastern Europe
New England clam chowder		United States (New England)	Chowders	Bacon, mirepoix, clam juice and heavy cream, with other ingredients such as potatoes and chopped clams
Nikujaga		Japan		Meat, potatoes and onion stewed in sweetened soy sauce, sometimes with ito konnyaku and vegetables
Nilaga		Philippines		A traditional meat stew or soup from the Philippines made with boiled beef (nilagang baka) or pork (nilagang baboy) with various vegetables. It is typically eaten with white rice and is served with soy sauce, patis (fish sauce), labuyo chilis, and calamansi on the side.
Nsala soup		Nigeria	Fish	Catfish simmered in a broth with yams and flavored with ogiri or iru, utazi, crayfish, and stock fish
Odong		Philippines		A Filipino noodle soup made with odong noodles, canned sardines in tomato sauce, bottle gourd (upo), loofah (patola), chayote, ginger, garlic, red onions, and various other vegetables.
Ofe onugbo		Igbo people, Nigeria	Assorted meat/fish	A local Igbo soup made with ''ogiri''local seasoning and bitterleaf, with meat, smoked fish, stock fish, cow tripe, and local cocoyam (ede uri] paste as thickner
Oi naengguk		Korea	Cold	A Korean naengguk made with cucumber and garlicky, sour, salty, sweetish broth. Typically eaten as a refreshing side dish in summer.
Okra soup				Okra
Okroshka		Ukraine; Russia	Cold (chilled)	Kvass-based vegetable and ham soup
Oxtail soup			Chunky	Any soup that uses beef tails
Palm nut soup		Central and West Africa		Palm kernel
Palóc soup		Hungary	Chunky	A meat (typically beef, pork, or mutton) and vegetable soup similar to goulash, soured with vinegar or lemon juice and the addition of sour cream
Panada		Europe	Potage	Bread soup made with leftover bread, eggs, beef broth and Parmigiano-Reggiano Cheese.
Panadelsuppe		Austria	Bread	Made with broth, rolls and eggs
Pancit buko		Philippines		A Filipino dish made from very thin strips of young coconut (buko) meat with various spices, vegetables, and meat or seafood.
Pancotto		Italy	Vegetable soup	Prepared with pieces of stale bread boiled in broth or water and seasoned.
Pappa al pomodoro		Italy	Bread soup	Typically prepared with fresh tomatoes, bread, olive oil, garlic, basil, and various other fresh ingredients. It is usually made with stale or leftover bread, and can be served hot, room temperature, or chilled
Pasta fagioli		Italy	Noodle	Slow cooked beans, pasta and vegetables.
Pasulj		Balkans	Chunky	Smoked meat, such as bacon, sausage, or ham hocks, cooked with beans and typically eaten during the winter months
Pawpaw soup		Nigeria		Beef, egusi, dried pawpaw flakes and palm oil cooked together
Pea soup			Chunky	One of any cosmopolitan soups using peas as the primary ingredient. Other vegetables and different cuts of pork are commonly used to flavor the soup. Split pea soup uses split peas in particular. Pictured is Canadian yellow pea soup.
Peanut soup		Africa	Chunky	Made from peanuts, popular in African cuisine. Pictured is peanut soup (left) with fufu.
Peppersoup		Nigeria	Brothy	A thin, spicy soup containing various meats or fishes, flavored with chili peppers, clove basil and calabash nutmeg
Philadelphia Pepper Pot		United States (Philadelphia)	Chunky	Beef tripe and pepper soup
Phở		Vietnam	Noodle	Staple noodle soup made by simmering marrow-rich beef leg bones and knuckles with star anise, cinnamon, clove, cardamom, coriander, fennel, charred ginger, and charred onion to create the broth, served with rice noodles and various meats. Pho Dac Biet, or "Special Combination" Pho, usually includes rare beef slices, beef balls, tripe, and flank meat. Pho is garnished to taste with thai basil, squeezed lime, jalapeños, bean sprouts, and sometimes culantro. Sriracha and hoisin sauce are also popular additions. Chicken, seafood and vegetarian varieties also exist.
Pickle soup			Chunky	Various types of pickled vegetables, dill pickle soup is a variety of pickle soup prepared with pickled cucumber. Pictured is kidney and pickle soup with barley (rassolnik).
Pork blood soup		Thailand		Thai cuisine; one version is called tom lueat mu. Also a part of Chinese cuisine, and was consumed by laborers in Kaifeng "over 1,000 years ago".
Powsowdie		Scotland	Chunky	Sheep's head and trotters cooked in a broth, sometimes with dried pea and barley
Pozole		Mexico	Chunky	Pork or chicken meat and broth, hominy, onion, garlic, dried chiles and cilantro, in a thick, hearty soup
Prawn soup			Chunky chowder	One of any cosmopolitan soups that use prawns or shrimp as a primary ingredient
Prdelačka		Czech Republic	Chunky	Pig blood, cooked in pork broth with potato, groat, onion and garlic. It is traditionally made as a part of pig slaughter.
Psarosoupa (ψαρόσουπα)		Greece	Fish	Oil-and-lemon sauce, vegetables, rice, and salt-water fish
Pumpkin		North America	Smooth or chunky	Pumpkin cream soup may contain some green pepper (Italian), red bell pepper, onion, salt and some oil. Rucola leaves top the soup.
Purée Mongole			Smooth or chunky	Split peas, tomatoes, carrots, onions, white turnips, leeks, stock (beef or chicken), milk; simplified versions may be made using canned, condensed pea and tomato soups as a base; also called Cream Mongole
Ramen		Japan	Noodle	Fresh or dried noodles in a variety of broths with a variety of toppings such as roast pork, onion, herbs, and vegetables
Rasam		India (southern)	Potage	Broth made in various ways using different spices and tamarind
Rassolnik		Russia	Chunky	Dill pickle soup. It usually contains groats, such as pearl barley, rice or oatmeal, potatoes, greens and herbs. It is either vegetarian or more commonly made with meat (often offal, such as kidney).
Rawon		Indonesia (Surabaya)	Chunky beef	A beef soup in keluak-flavored broth. Specialty of the city of Surabaya, East Java.
Ribollita		Italy (Tuscany)		A bread soup, panade, porridge, or potage made with bread and vegetables, often from leftovers
Rishtay / Rqaq o Adas		Middle East (Palestinian)	Bean / Noodle	A whole lentil soup made with hand cut wheat noodles (similar to linguine) and flavored with fried garlic.
Rose hip soup (Nyponsoppa)		Sweden	Watery	A soup made from blended rose hips, usually served for breakfast or dessert
Rumford's Soup		Germany (Munich, Bavaria)	Potage	Simple soup prepared with barley or barley meal and dried peas as primary ingredients that was utilized to feed impoverished people.
Saimin		United States (Hawaii)	Noodle	Fresh, soft, undried egg noodles in bonito fish or shrimp broth with Chinese, Japanese, Filipino, Hawaiian, Korean, and Portuguese influences
Salmorejo		Spain	Cold (chilled)	Tomato soup with garlic and bread crumbs
Sambar		India	Chunky, gelatinous	Sambar, also spelt sambhar, is a lentil-based vegetable stew or chowder based on a broth made with tamarind popular in South Indian and Sri Lankan Tamil cuisines, adapted in each to its taste and environment.
Samgyetang		Korea	Chunky	Chicken ginseng soup made with glutinous rice, jujubes, chestnuts, garlic, and ginger
Sayur Asem		Indonesia	Cold	An Indonesian vegetable soup that is sour and spicy
Sayur Lodeh		Indonesia (Java)	Chunky vegetable soup	Vegetables stew in coconut milk based soup.
Scotch Broth		Scotland	Potage	Mutton, barley, and various vegetables
Shark fin soup		China	Gelatinous	An expensive Chinese delicacy using shark fins, valued for their texture; considered controversial for the killing of sharks for only their fins.
Shchav, sorrel soup, green borscht, green shchi		Eastern Europe	Chunky	Made from water or broth, sorrel leaves, and salt. Varieties of the same soup include spinach, garden orache, chard, nettle, and occasionally dandelion, goutweed or ramsons, together with or instead of sorrel. It is known in Ashkenazi Jewish, Belarusian, Estonian, Hungarian, Latvian, Lithuanian, Romanian, Armenian, Georgian, Polish, Russian and Ukrainian cuisines.
Shchi		Russia	Chunky	Cabbage soup, a national Russian dish.
Seafood chowder		Ireland	Chowder	Salmon, mussels, shrimp, and scallops in a cream base
She-crab soup		United States (Charleston, South Carolina)	Chowder	Blue crab meat and crab roe
Shrimp bisque		France	Bisque	Shrimp
Sinabawang gulay		Philippines		A Filipino vegetable soup made with leafy vegetables (usually moringa leaves) and various other vegetables in a broth seasoned with seafood stock or patis (fish sauce).
Sinigang		Philippines		A Filipino soup or stew characterized by its sour and savoury taste. It is most often associated with tamarind (Filipino: sampalok), although it can use other sour fruits and leaves as the souring agent. It is one of the more popular dishes in Filipino cuisine.
Sishen soup		Taiwan	Chunky	Typically made using traditional Chinese medicine ingredients and is a popular dish in night markets and eateries across Taiwan. The broth of tends to have a milky color, with a rich and hearty taste.
Sliced fish soup		Singapore	Fish	Fish, prawns, and vegetables
Snert		Netherlands	Chunky	Thick pea soup, eaten in the winter, traditionally served with sliced sausage
Solyanka		Russia	Chunky	Pickled cucumbers, sausages, smoked meat, fish or mushrooms, olives
Sop saudara		Indonesia (Makassar)	Chunky	Spicy beef soup contains bits of beef and offals (usually fried cow's lungs), rice vermicelli, perkedel (fried potato patty) and hard boiled egg.
Sopa de fideo		Spain, Mexico, Philippines	Brothy	Spanish and Mexican sopa de fideo ("noodle soup") is made by browning thin wheat flour noodles slightly before cooking them in broth; vegetables and seasoning are usually added as well. Filipino sopa de fideo uses glass noodles in chicken stock and may include other meat and vegetable additions.
Sopa de Gato		Spain (southern)		Simple soup, typically includes water, bread, oil, garlic, and salt
Sopa de lima		Yucatan, Mexico	Chicken	Chicken and vegetables like tomato and bell pepper in a chicken broth flavored primarily with lime juice, often served with tortilla chips
Sopas		Philippines	Noodle soup	A Filipino macaroni soup made with elbow macaroni, various vegetables, and meat (usually chicken), in a creamy broth with evaporated milk.
Soto		Indonesia	Chunky	Rich soups based on various spice pastes, broths and sometimes coconut milk, often named by their originating region. Soto usually features numerous garnishes, including sprouts, sambal, crackers, fritters, and sometimes noodles.
Soto ayam		Indonesia	Noodle	Rich chicken soup with shredded chicken and rice noodles. Served with a variety of garnishes, which may include bean sprouts, hard-boiled egg, green onions, fried shallots, sambal, compressed rice cakes, emping (melinjo nut crackers) and potato fritters.
Soup No. 5		Philippines	Chunky (aphrodisiac)	The main ingredient of this dish are the bull's testes or/and penis, other ingredients include lemongrass, thai chili peppers, green onion, ginger, onions, garlic and fish sauce.
Sour cherry soup		Hungary	Cold (chilled)	Hungarian: meggyleves. Sour cherries, sour cream
Sour rye soup, white borscht, żur		Poland, Belarus		Made of soured rye flour (akin to sourdough) and meat (usually boiled pork sausage or pieces of smoked sausage, bacon or ham)
Sour soup (fish soup)		Vietnam	Fish	Rice, fish, various vegetables, and in some cases pineapple. The term also refers to various soups in a number of national cuisines.
Spinach soup			Broth- or cream-based	Prepared using spinach as a main ingredient
Squash bisque		France	Bisque	
Stone soup		Portugal	Chunky	Pork meat products (such as black chouriço, common chouriço and bacon), red beans, and coriander
Stracciatella		Italy	Broth with chunks	Made by drizzling a preparation based on beaten eggs into boiling meat broth while stirring.
Sulu köfte		Turkey	Chunky	Ground meat, rice, spices, broth
Sup Kambing		Indonesia and Malaysia	Chunky	Goat meat, tomato, celery, spring onion, ginger, candlenut and lime leaf, its broth is yellowish in color
Suam na mais		Philippines	Chunky/Seafood	Corn kernels, shrimp, pork, leafy vegetables
Taco soup		United States	Chunky	Similar ingredients to those used inside a taco: ground beef, tomatoes, chopped green chilis, olives, onions, corn, beans, and a packet of taco seasoning. Vegetarian versions combine beans with the other ingredients, except for the ground beef.
Taiwanese beef noodle soup		Taiwan	Brothy	Beef chunks simmered in broth for hours, served with noodles, and made distinct by the addition of suan cai and green onions served on top, sometimes with other vegetables cooked in the broth
Talabaw		Myanmar	Brothy to stewlike	Primary ingredient is bamboo shoots, with a small amount of rice and some shreds of meat or seafood. One of the most well known soups in Myanmar, and widely considered to be the essential dish of Karen cuisine.
Talbina		Arabian Peninsula		Talbina is a soup made from barley flour, formed by adding milk and honey to the dried barley powder. It is called talbina, which comes from the Arabic word laban meaning yogurt (milk/fermented churned milk), because of its resemblance to yogurt, as it is soft and white.
Tāng Fěn		China	Noodle	Rice noodles in broth, usually beef, chicken, or custom broth
Tāng miǎn		China	Noodle	Egg noodles in broth, usually beef, chicken, or custom broth
Tapado		Garifuna	Seafood	Coconut milk, seafood, plantains
Tarator		Bulgaria	Cold (chilled)	Yogurt and cucumbers
Tarhana		Middle East	Chunky	Fermented grain and dairy
Tekwan		Indonesia (Palembang)	Chunky	Fishcake or fishballs, jicama and mushroom soup in savoury broth. Specialty of the city of Palembang.
Tharida		Arabia	Chunky	A soup prepared with meat and breadcrumbs, which thickens the soup. Additional ingredients may include beans, walnuts, yogurt, mint, and spices
Tiger penis soup		China	Chunky	Soup prepared with tiger penis, and sometimes tiger bone as well. Preparation involves soaking dried tiger penis in water and then cooking it along with other medicines and spices. Believed to be a medicinal aphrodisiac in some cultures.
Tinola		Philippines	Potage	Chicken, sliced green papayas, malunggay
Tiyula itum		Philippines		A Filipino braised beef or goat soup or stew dish originating from the Tausug people. The dish is characteristically black due to the unique use of charred coconut meat.
Tom yum		Thailand	Chunky	Lemongrass, galangal and kaffir lime leaf, fish sauce and lime juice in the broth, often garnished with shrimp/seafood (Tom Yum Goong), straw mushrooms, hot chili peppers, and cilantro.
Tomato bisque		France	Bisque	Tomatoes and heavy cream; basil can be added to create tomato basil bisque
Tomato soup			Smooth or chunky	Tomato is the primary ingredient. Also popular in many countries, including Hungary (Hungarian: paradicsomleves) and Poland (Polish: pomidorowa)
Tongseng		Indonesia (Solo)	Chunky meat	A sweet and spicy goat meat soup, specialty of the city of Surakarta (also known as Solo), Central Java.
Tortilla soup		Mexico	Chunky	Fried corn tortilla pieces submerged into a broth of tomato and other ingredients.
Tteokguk		Korea	Chunky	The Tteok (rice cake) soup is eaten during New Year's Day.
Turkey soup		United States and Canada	Chunky	Turkey stock and meat, vegetables (typically onions, carrots, celery), broad egg noodles or rice
Tuo zaafi		Ghana	Brothy	Ugali, cornmeal dough boiled in boiling water or milk, served in a green vegetable soup
Ukha or yushka		Russia; Ukraine	Fish	Various types of fish, vegetables, lime, dill, parsley, and black pepper
Vegetable soup			Clear or Stock	Vegetables are a primary ingredient
Vichyssoise		United States	Cold (chilled)	Creamy potato and leek soup, served with chives
Vori vori		Paraguay	Chunky	Balls of corn flour and cheese, often with chicken
Walnut soup		China, Italy, Mexico	Smooth	A creamy soup that uses walnuts as a prominent ingredient.
Watercress soup			Brothy; Creamy	A soup which uses watercress as a primary ingredient. Other vegetables may be included as well as cheese, butter, lemon, and seasoning
Waterzooi		Belgium	Fish	Stew made with fish (traditional) or chicken
Wedding soup		United States (Italian–American)	Clear or Stock	Green vegetables, meat, chicken broth
Wine soup		Hungary	Beverage soup	Hungarian: borleves.
Winter melon		China	Chunky	Winter melon, filled with stock (usually chicken stock), vegetables, and meat, which has been steamed for a few hours
Zalewajka		Poland	Chunky	A soup of boiled potatoes, sometimes with Polish sausage and dried mushrooms, thickened sour rye made from a sourdough starter. Other ingredients may include onions, garlic, sour cream, bacon, and herbs.
Zuppa del canavese		Canavese (Piedmont, Italy)	Bread	Sliced bread cooked with cabbage, grana, and broth
Zuppa pavese		Italy	Broth with chunks	Consists of broth into which fried slices of bread and poached eggs are placed. It is usually served with grated cheese.
Zuppa toscana		Italy (Tuscany)	Chunky	A soup with cannellini beans, potato, and kale. Americanized versions substitutes the beans with Italian sausage, and add cream, bacon, and vegetables like onion and red bell pepper.

== See also ==
- Broth
- Chowder
- Consommé
- List of fish soups
- Fruit soup
- List of Azerbaijani soups and stews
- List of cheese soups
- List of Chinese soups
- List of cream soups
- List of cold soups
- List of fish and seafood soups
- List of French soups and stews
- List of German soups
- List of Indonesian soups
- List of Italian soups
- List of Japanese soups and stews
- List of Pakistani soups and stews
- List of porridges
- List of ramen dishes
- List of Spanish soups and stews
- List of vegetable soups
- Soup and sandwich
- Soups in East Asian cultures
- Stew
- Stocks
- Three grand soups
