= Soyutma =

Soup from the Caucasus that is Azerbaijan's national dish

- Type: Soup
- Main ingredients: Lamb

Soyutma (meaning long and slow-cooked meat) is a soup and Azerbaijan's national dish. Lamb, onions, tomatoes, and sour cream are the main ingredients, although it can also be made with chicken.

== See also ==
- List of soups
