= Cooking pot =

Container used for cooking

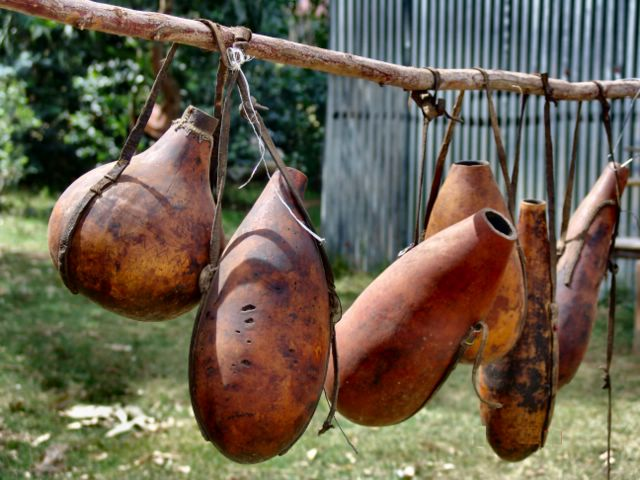
Hand-crafted pots for sale in Kenya

A cooking pot (saucepan in British English) is a large bowl that is heated in order to cook the food inside it. They can be made from either ceramics or metals, and have been used nearly everywhere in the world throughout human history. Cooking pots often include features such as handles or lids to make them easier to use while heating food.

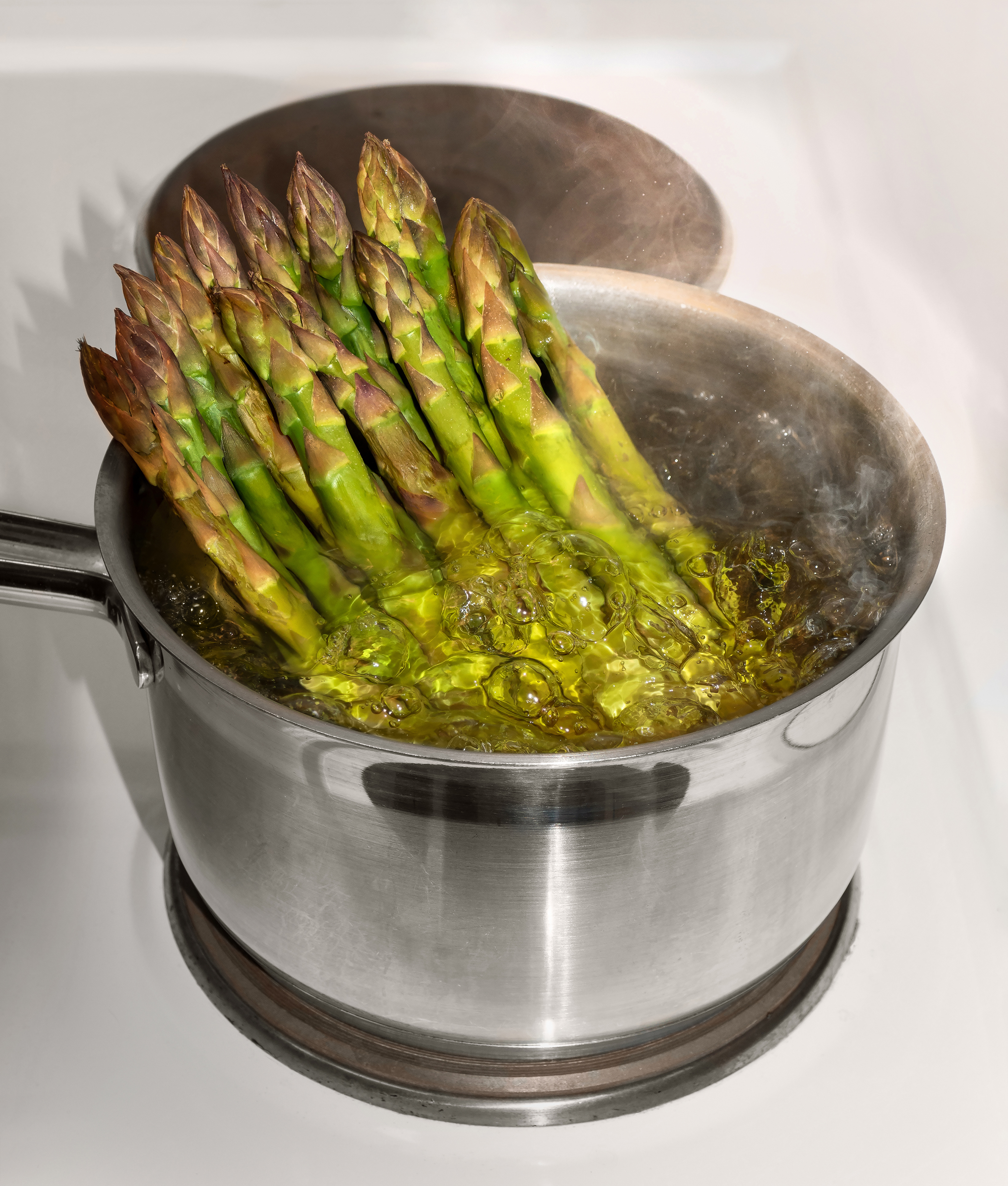
A stainless steel cooking pot.

== Ceramic pots ==
The earliest cooking pots were made of clay or ceramics. Ceramics, such as stoneware or glass, are stable materials that conduct poorly, so these pots must cook over relatively low heats and over long periods of time. They are generally used in ovens, not on stovetops, where they may crack from too much concentrated heat. Even after metal pots came into widespread use, earthenware pots are still preferred among the less well-off, globally, due to their low production cost.

Metal pots are generally made from a narrow range of metals. This is because pots and pans need to conduct heat well, but also need to be chemically unreactive so that they do not alter the flavor of the food. Most materials that are conductive enough to heat evenly are too reactive to use in food preparation.

== Stock pot ==
Stock pot or Large cooking pot, is a generic name for a cooking pot used worldwide. A stock pot is traditionally used to make stock or broth, which can be the basis for cooking more complex recipes.

=== Description ===
A stock pot is a large, often deep pot that is used to prepare soups or simmer liquids. It is a wide pot with a flat bottom, straight sides, a wide opening to the full diameter of the pot, two handles on the sides, and a lid with a handle on top. The most common materials for manufacturing stock pots are stainless steel, aluminum, copper, and enamel (Vitreous enamel) on metal. More expensive types of stock pots have bottoms that are made of layers of different metals, to enhance heat conductivity.

=== Uses ===
On the first page of his publication “A Guide to Modern Cookery” (1907), French Chef Auguste Escoffier states that "stocks are the keynote of culinary structure" in French cuisine. A stock or broth is made by simmering water for several hours, to continuously cook added foods such as pieces of meat, meat bones, fish, or vegetables. The slow simmering process transfers flavors, colors, and nutrients to the water, where they blend, and a new ingredient is thus created, the broth or stock.

A broth made with meat or meat bones creates a base with concentrated flavors and aromas, even without the addition of salt or herbs or spices. This is what is referred to as a soup base. Stock pots are also used for cooking stews, porridge, boiled foods, steamed shellfish, and many other types of recipes.

Stock pots have great versatility, and so they are used for many cooking purposes, and occasionally non-cooking purposes. For example, large stock pots are often used at home to boil clothing, wool, or yarn for color dying. They do not necessarily come in standard sizes. Manufacturers label pot sizes usually by volume (e.g., "12 liters") or sometimes by diameter (e.g., "28 cm").

== See also ==
- Cookware and bakeware
- Pottery
- Cauldron
