= Aloo tama =

Nepali soup

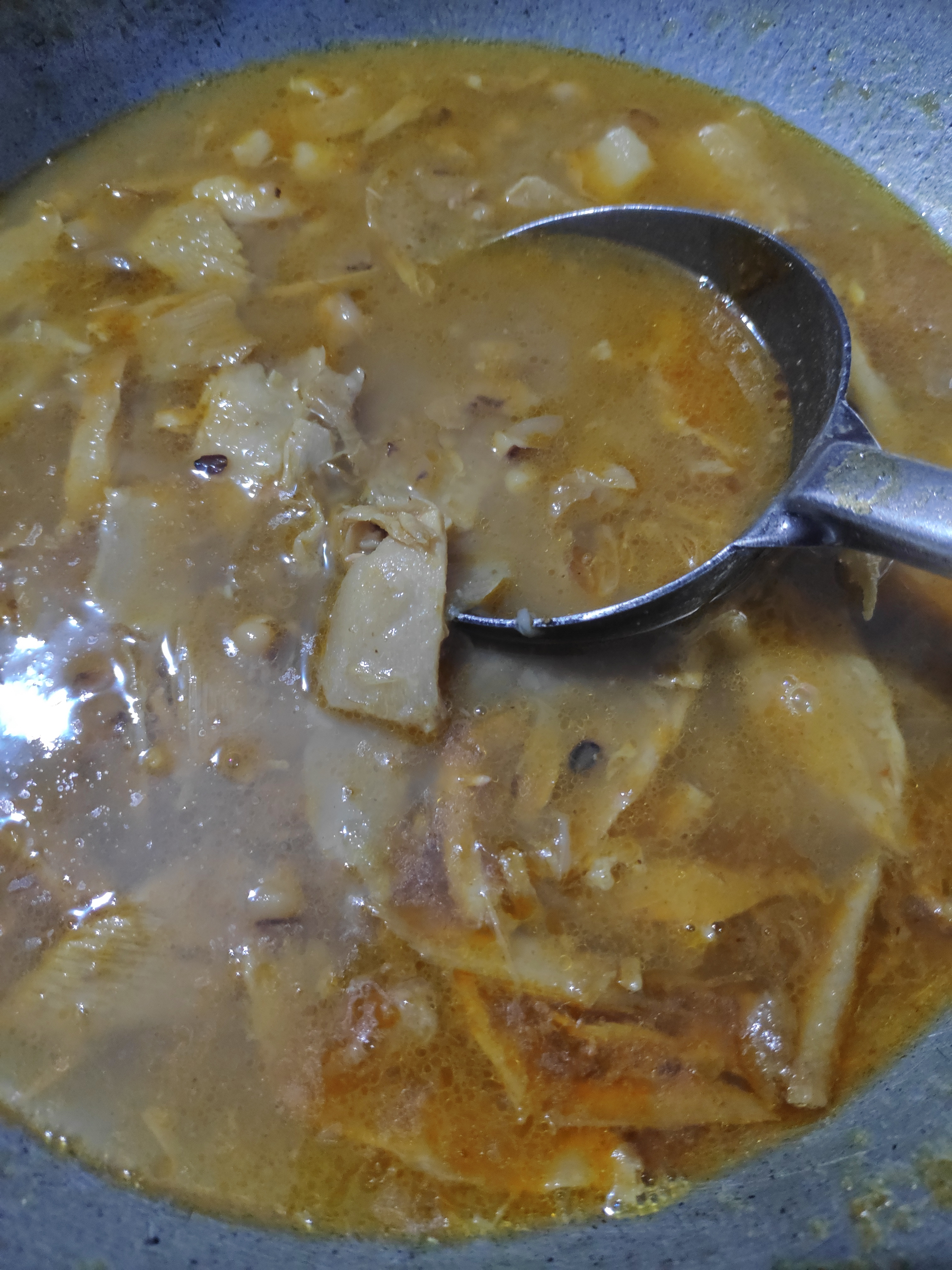
- Cooked aloo tama
- Alternative names: Aloo bodi tama
- Type: Soup, curry
- Course: Main
- Place of origin: Nepal
- Region or state: Hilly region of Nepal
- Main ingredients: Fermented bamboo shoots (tama), boiled potatoes, black-eyed peas, salt, spices
- Ingredients generally used: Onion, garlic, tomatoes, chilies, pepper

Aloo tama (Nepali: आलू तामा) or aloo bodi tama (Nepali: आलू बोडी तामा) is a Nepali soup dish made of fermented bamboo shoots, potatoes and black-eyed peas.

== Etymology ==
Aloo tama can literally be translated as potato and tama soup. Tama is fermented bamboo shoots that has a strong sour taste.

== Preparation ==
A simple potato curry is cooked and at the final stages the bamboo is fried (some may not choose to do it) and added to the soup. Another ingredient in this soup very commonly used would be bodi or tane bodi which is the black eyed peas making it aloo tama bodi. Garlic, tomatoes and lemon are also used by some people.

== See also ==
- List of soups
- Kwati
- Gundruk
