= Soup du Barry =

French soup made from cauliflower, potatoes and stock

Soup du Barry (French: potage Dubarry, velouté Dubarry or crème Dubarry) is a French soup made from cauliflower, potatoes, and stock (traditionally veal stock). The use of stock makes it a velouté; the addition of cream and an egg yolk makes it a crème. It is named after Madame du Barry, mistress of King Louis XV of France.
