= Chupe =

Variety of stew

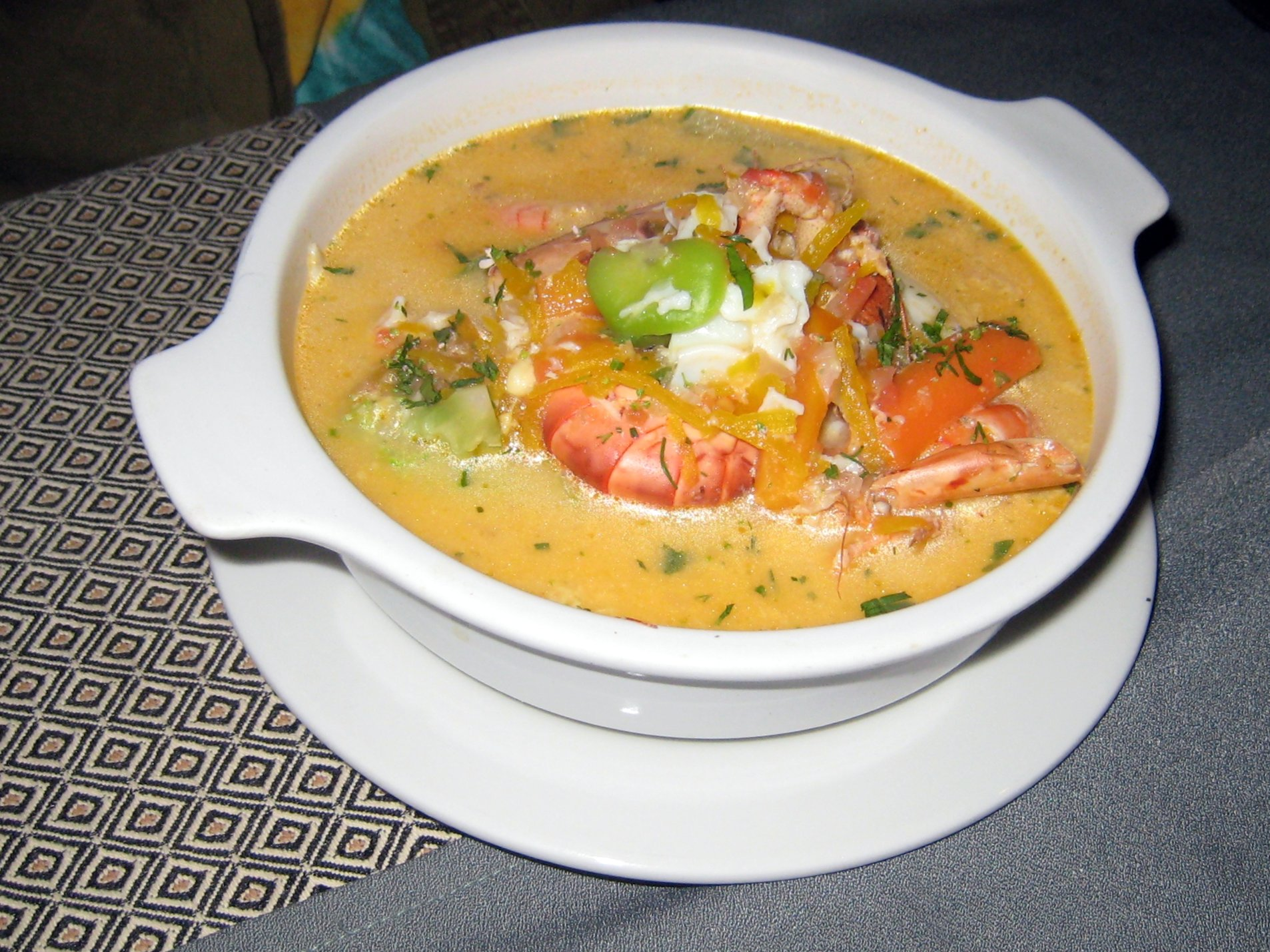
- Chupe de camarones
- Type: Stew
- Main ingredients: Meat (chicken, red meat, lamb or beef tripe, or offal) or seafood (fish, shrimp, crayfish, or shellfish), vegetables, potatoes or yuca, milk or cream

Chupe is a generic term used in South America to a variety of stew generally made with chicken, red meat, lamb or beef tripe and other offal, or with fish, shrimp, crayfish or shellfish such as loco, and vegetables, potatoes or yuca.

Chupe de camarones (made with crayfish) is generally popular among the Southern coastal region of Peru (originally from Arequipa). Although the original recipe calls for crayfish, shrimp chupe has become more widely eaten, as fresh or frozen shrimp become more common. The preparation consists of cooking potatoes and onions in butter, then adding various spices, such as chilli powder. Then, water, tomatoes, and sometimes chicken broth are added. Before serving the broth, it is mixed with milk or cream.

Chupe is typical of South American cuisine, but more specifically to the cuisines of Bolivia, Chile and Peru. The city of Arequipa in Peru has a traditional sequence of chupes that are served on specific days of the week. On Fridays, the chupe is meatless because of the religious traditions of the country.

== See also ==
- Chupe Andino
- List of soups
