= Chupe andino =

Stews and soups from the Andes region

- Place of origin: Andes

Chupe andino refers to various stews and soups that are prepared in the Andes mountains region in South America. Chupe Andino may be prepared by Andean people, those that live in the region. It is sometimes prepared in large portions to feed many people at marketplaces and events. Chupe Andino is sometimes served with wine as an accompaniment. Soups and stews play a significant part in Andean cuisine, because the cold weather in the region demands nutritious, fatty foods that are warming.

The term chupe is a standard South American term that refers to various stews prepared with meats, fish and seafood, tripe and offal. Additional ingredients may include potato, onion, garlic and cheese. In the past, it has been prepared using yuca as an ingredient.

== See also ==
- List of soups
- List of stews
