= Pawpaw soup =

Nigerian soup

Pawpaw soup is a popular delicacy of one of the Tiv ethnic group of Nigeria, the soup is made up of dry pawpaw flakes, palm oil, beef and egusi.

== Origin ==
The soup is common to the Tiv tribe of Benue state whose slogan is "Food basket of the Nation".

== Overview ==
Beef is fried and after which the stock from it is added to a pot alongside palm oil, egusi, onion and seasoning cubes. The soup is allowed to cook for a few minutes after which the unripe pawpaw flakes are added.

== Other foods ==
Pawpaw soup is best taken with swallows such as pounded yam, fufu, eba and semovita.

== See also ==
- Jamaican cuisine
- List of soups
- Mountain papaya
