= Sliced fish soup =

Singaporean soup

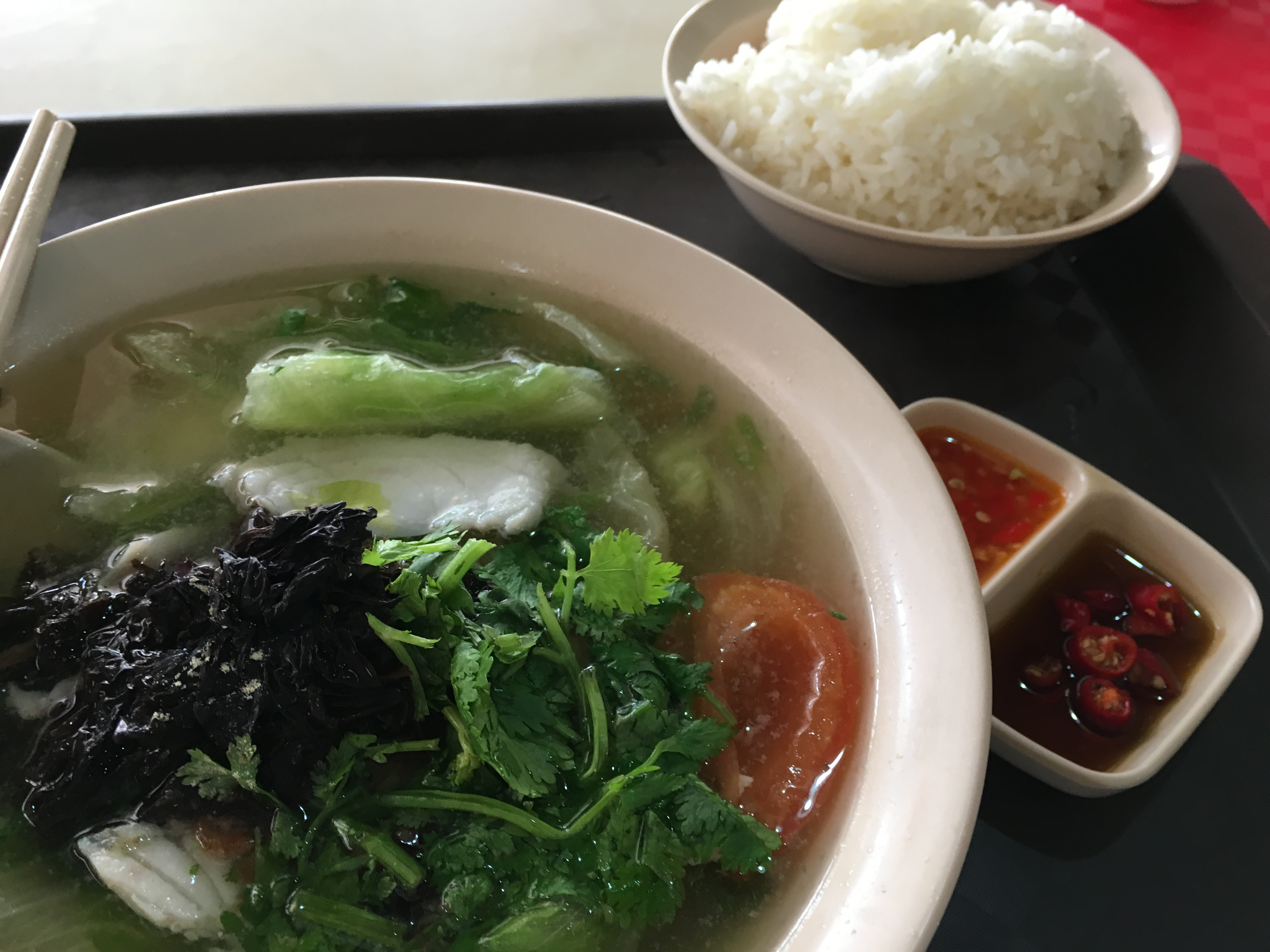
- Type: Soup
- Place of origin: Singapore
- Main ingredients: Fish, vegetables, sometimes prawns

Sliced fish soup is a popular dish in Singapore, believed to have originated from the Teochews. It consists of fish, vegetables, and beancurd; with the addition of cuttlefish and prawns, the dish is called seafood soup. It is sold in most hawker centres and usually costs between SGD 5 and SGD 7.

== See also ==
- List of soups
