= Mandia peja =

Indian finger millet and rice soup

Mandia peja is a type of Indian soup made up of mandia (ragi) and rice. This soup is the major food of Adivasis or tribals living in Southern Orissa (Korput, Rayagada, Nabarangpur and Malkangiri) and its adjacent areas of Chhattisgarh and Andhra Pradesh.

== See also ==
- List of soups
