= Caldillo de perro =

Soup made with fish and oranges

Caldillo de perro (literally "dog soup") is a fish soup of Andalusia (southern Spain). The name is said to come from "el Perro," the nickname of a shipboard cook in El Puerto de Santa María. The main ingredients are hake, garlic, olive oil, lemons, and Seville oranges. It is customarily served with sour orange juice. It is a common dish in the fishing districts.

== Characteristics ==
The fresh fish stock is cut into slices and seasoned with salt. The soup is traditionally cooked in a clay pot. Olive oil, garlic, onions, leeks, carrots, and parsley (with mussels occasionally added) are brought to a boil and then gently simmered for approximately 30 minutes. The sliced fish is added at the end and served with sour orange juice and white bread. The soup is served hot and freshly cooked.

== See also ==
- List of soups
- Spanish cuisine
