= List of Azerbaijani soups and stews =

Azerbaijani cuisine includes a variety of soups and stews.

== Azerbaijani soups and stews ==
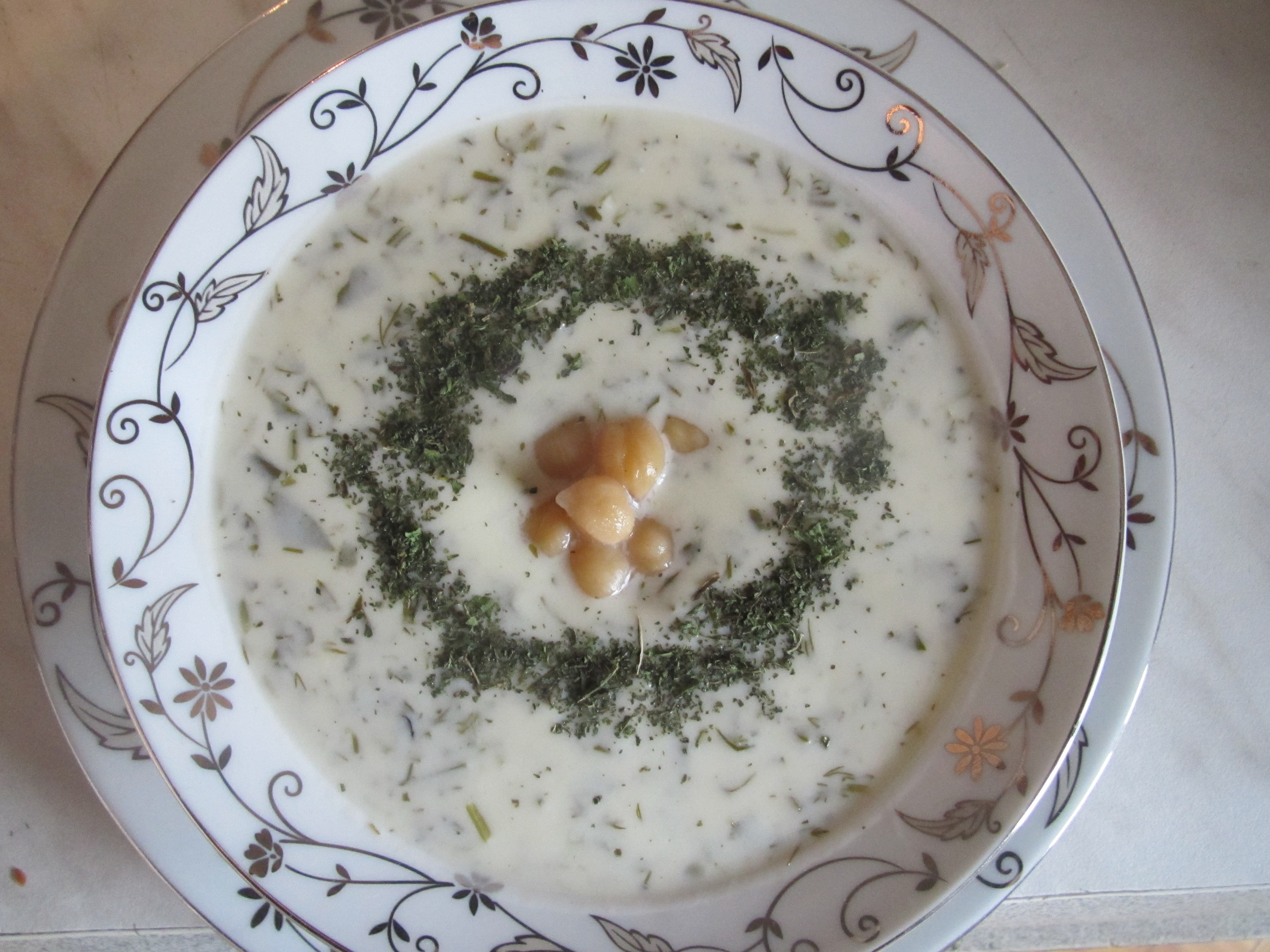
Dovga

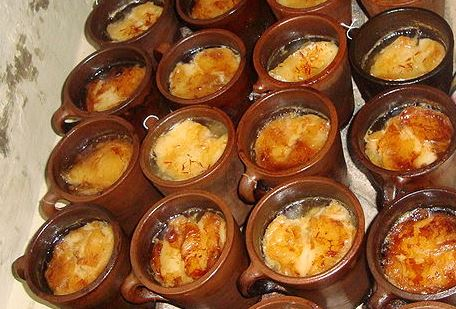
Piti

- Bozartma (lamb stew) is a Caucasian soup with lamb popular in Georgia and Azerbaijan. The word bozartma is derived from the Turkish word bozartmaq which means 'cooked chunk of meat'. Lamb shank needs to be steamed for a long time before it is fully cooked.
- Dovga is a soup made of plain yoghurt and a variety of herbs. The soup can be served either cold or warm. Different herbs may be used for cooking dovga – coriander, dill, mint, chervil, parsley, etc.
- Dushbara is a soup made of very small dumplings with ground meat inside which are boiled in lamb broth. Dushbara is usually served with vinegar.
- Khash is cow's-foot tendon stew or soup of Armenian origin. It is a popular dish in Azerbaijan eaten on weekend mornings during winter. Khash has to be cooked for at least 8 hours, until the broth becomes very thick. Cow's stomach and head may also be used for cooking khash.
- Kyufta bozbash, the Azerbaijani dish, usually eaten during wintertime. It is made of ground beef or lamb formed into medium-sized balls. The word kyufta originates from the Persian word kuftan, which means 'to beat', because the meat for kyufta needs to be beaten before being formed into balls. The word bozbash comes from Turkish-Azerbaijani words boz, which is translated as 'gray', and bash which is translated as 'head'. It is served with a variety of vegetables.
- Ovdukh is cold yoghurt and herb soup. It contains cucumber and herbs. Hard-boiled eggs and minced meat can sometimes be added.
- Piti is a dish popular in the Sheki region of Azerbaijan. Piti is cooked in ceramic clay pots called. It is traditionally made of chickpeas, lamb, onion, saffron, chestnut, dried plum and sheep tail fat. Piti should be eaten in two steps. First comes the soup with bread, then the remaining part.
