= Caldo tlalpeño =

Chicken and vegetable soup in Mexican cuisine

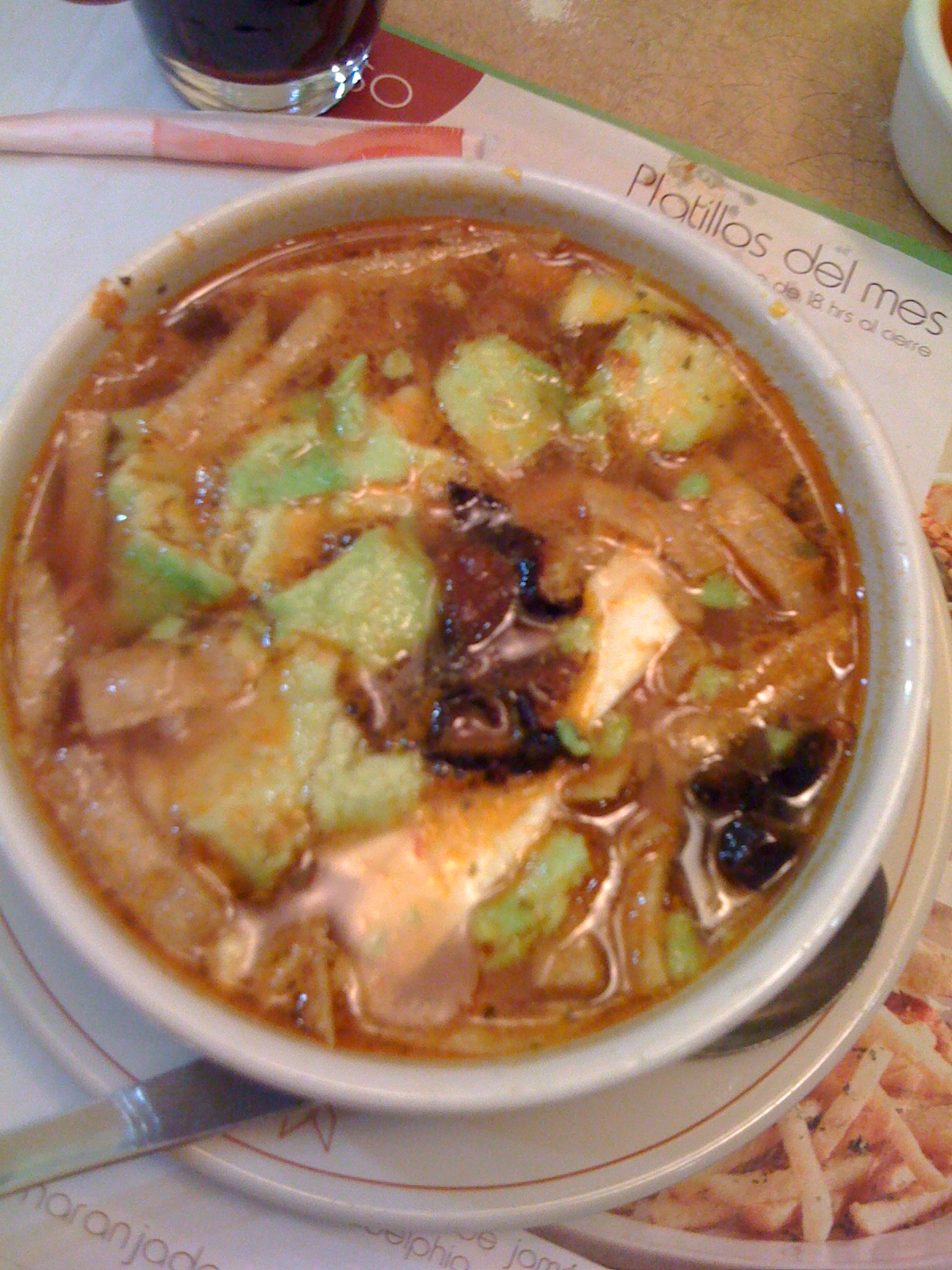
- Course: Soup
- Place of origin: Mexico
- Main ingredients: Chicken meat, chickpeas, carrots, green beans, chicken broth

Caldo tlalpeño is a chicken and vegetable stew in Mexican cuisine which contains chicken meat, and chickpeas, carrots, and green beans, submerged in a chicken broth with garlic and onion, seasoned with epazote, cumin and chipotle chili. It is served with avocado slices and diced cheese, and accompanied with lime.

== See also ==
- List of Mexican dishes
- List of soups
- Mexican cuisine
