= Bisque (food) =

Cream-based soup of French origin

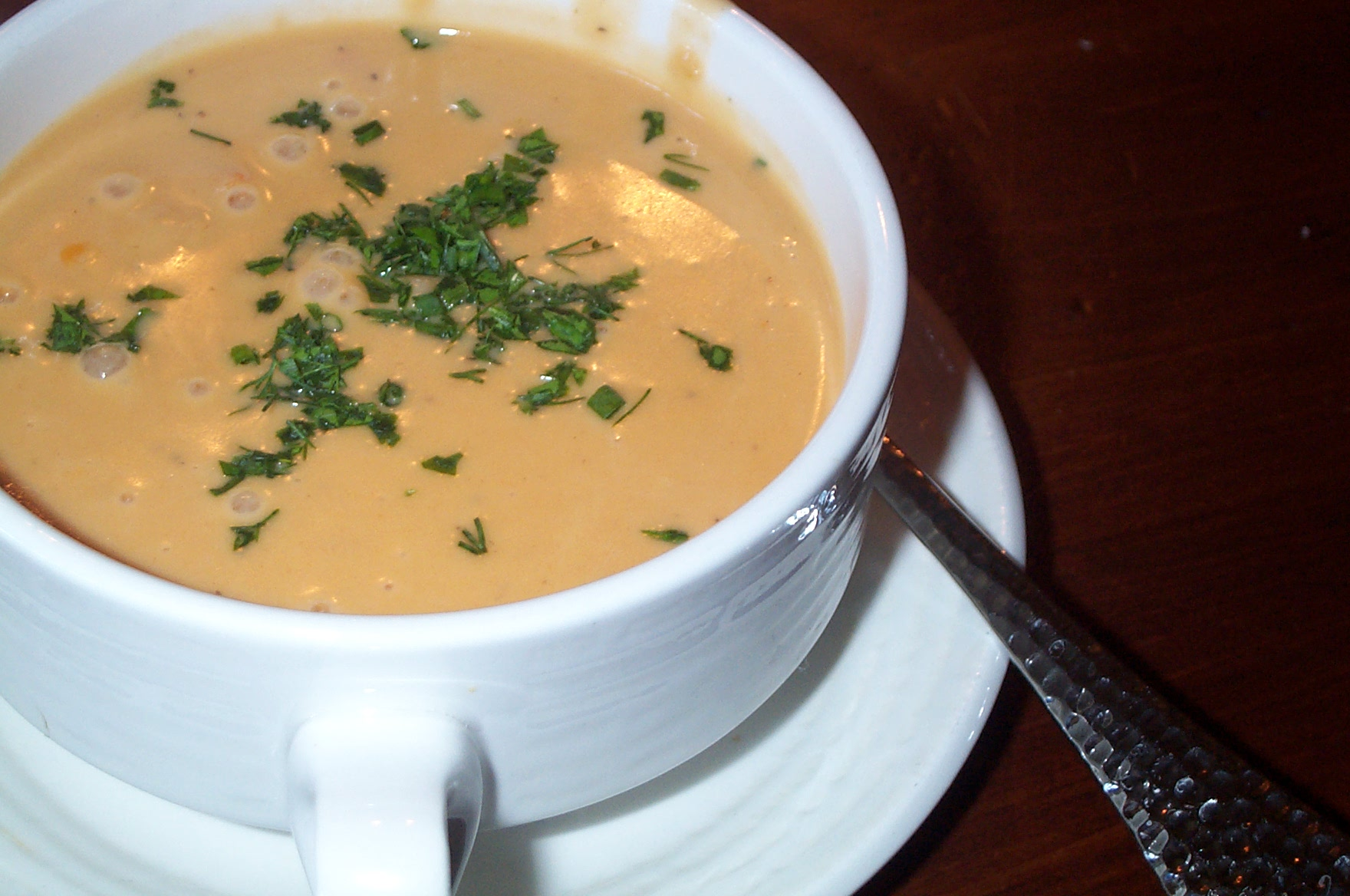
- Lobster bisque
- Type: Soup
- Place of origin: France
- Main ingredients: Crustaceans (lobster, langoustine, crab, shrimp or crayfish), rice

Bisque or bisk (French pronunciation: [bisk]; Occitan: Bisca) is a smooth, creamy, highly seasoned soup of French origin, classically based on a strained broth (coulis) of crustaceans. It can be made from lobster, langoustine, crab, shrimp, or crayfish. The French bisque is one of the most popular seafood soups around the world.

Although originally applied to seafood soups, the use of the word has expanded to mean any thick soup made with cream, such as bisque of tomato or bisque of mushroom. It is differentiated from a chowder, also a seafood soup, by its consistency, a chowder being less smooth and more chunky.

== Etymology ==
The Bay of Biscay, off the coast of France, widely theorised to be the namesake of the soup

The French-language name bisque may derive from Biscay, as in the Bay of Biscay. Historians theorise that bisque was popularised by fisherman off this coast, partly due to its most popular meat being lobster. Some theorise, however, that it may come from bis cuites, "cooked twice", first sautéed, then simmered.

Others have suggested that bisque derives from the Norman word for "sour drink".

== Origin and composition ==
Bisque was originally made from game, such as pigeon, and a pigeon bisque was listed in Le Cuisinier françois, by François Pierre La Varenne. It consisted of a soup of truffled pigeons, blanched and cooked in a flavored broth, served on slices of bread soaked in broth and garnished with cockscombs, sweetbreads, lamb jus, mushrooms, pistachios and lemon. The writer Antoine Furetière also defined bisque in his Dictionnaire universel, published in 1690, as being made from pigeons, chicken, beatilles, mutton juice, and other "good ingredients, which is only served on the table of the Great Lords." He gives as etymology,"This word in this sense comes from bis cotìa, because bisque is made from several beatilles, it is necessary to do several separate and repeated cookings, before giving it the final cooking and perfection," before adding that "we call fish bisque, that which is made with minced carp, their eggs and milk, and with crayfish."

After this, it became more common to make bisque out of seafood, leading historians to speculate it was popularised by fishermen, lending credence to the theory of the term's etymology originating from the Bay of Biscay, off the coast of France. This soup is now typically made from lobster, crayfish, crab or prawns. A new evolution of the concept tends to apply the term "bisque" to creamy soups in general, regardless of whether they contain seafood, with shellfish being substituted with pre-cooked vegetables such as squash, tomato, mushroom or red pepper, which are pureed in a food processor or vegetable mill. It is also common nowadays to thicken it with rice.

== Method ==
Bisque is a method of extracting flavor from crustaceans not perfect enough to send to market. The shellfish are first gently sautéed in their shells, then simmered in white wine and aromatic ingredients before the purée is made. This is then strained through a chinois to extract the coulis, which is thickened with cream to achieve the consistency of a velouté. It can also be thickened with rice, which can be strained, leaving the starch in the cream, or mashed with it. Simone Beck and Julia Child remarked, "Do not wash anything off until the soup is done because you will be using the same utensils repeatedly and you don't want any marvelous tidbits of flavor losing themselves down the drain." Orange vegetables, such as pumpkin or carrots, are also often used in bisques.

=== Lobster bisque ===
Lobster bisque is typically made from its shells, but to economise on meat use, some chefs such as Julia Child have used the tail, claws, and liver for the dish as well. Though it would have originated in France, lobster and crayfish bisque became popular in Louisiana, USA, as part of Cajun cuisine.

== See also ==
- List of crab dishes
- List of cream soups
- List of French soups and stews
- List of seafood dishes
- List of soups
