= Purée Mongole =

Tomato soup

- Alternative names: Cream Mongole
- Type: Soup
- Main ingredients: Split peas, tomatoes, carrots, onions, white turnips, leeks, stock (beef or chicken), milk

Purée Mongole, also called Cream Mongole, is a creamed split pea-tomato soup of unknown origin; a recipe for it was printed in 1889. Popular during the period between the 1920s–1940s, it is similar to Boula which is made with turtle soup.

Purée Mongole is usually made with carrots, onions, white turnips, leeks, a stock (either beef or chicken) and milk. Depending on the recipe, it can have julienne carrots and be seasoned with curry powder, ground cloves, turmeric, nutmeg, cumin, and basil, in addition to salt and pepper. Simplified recipes printed in many vintage cookbooks, including the 1946 edition of the Joy of Cooking, used canned, condensed pea and tomato soups as a base with additional vegetables and seasonings.

== See also ==
- List of soups
