= Purée =

Cooked food that has been made into soft creamy paste

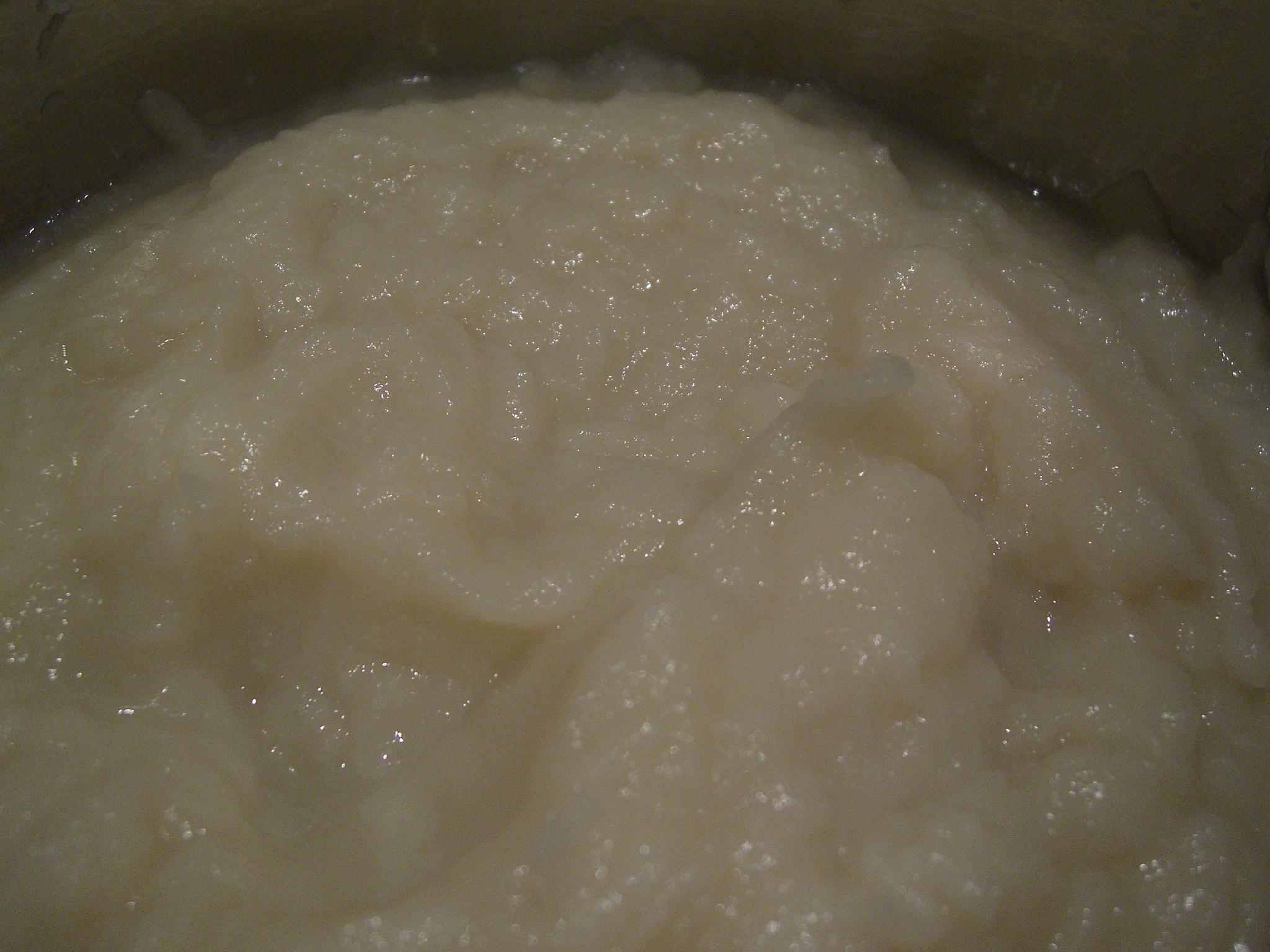
Cauliflower purée

A purée (or mash) is cooked food, usually vegetables, fruits or legumes, that has been ground, pressed, blended or sieved to the consistency of a creamy paste or liquid. Purées of specific foods are often known by specific names, e.g., apple sauce or hummus. The term is of French origin, where it meant in Old French (13th century) purified or refined.

Purées overlap with other dishes with similar consistency, such as thick soups, creams (crèmes) and gravies—although these terms often imply more complex recipes and cooking processes. Coulis (French for "strained") is a similar but broader term, more commonly used for fruit purées. The term is not commonly used for paste-like foods prepared from cereal flours, such as gruel or muesli; nor with oily nut pastes, such as peanut butter. The term "paste" is often used for purées intended to be used as an ingredient, rather than eaten immediately.

Purées can be made in a blender, or with special implements such as a potato masher, or by forcing the food through a strainer, or simply by crushing the food in a pot. Purées generally must be cooked, either before or after grinding, in order to improve flavour and texture, remove toxic substances, and/or reduce their water content.

It is common to purée entire meals (without use of salt or other additives) to be served to toddlers, babies, and those unable to chew as sufficient, nutritious meals. Baby food is often a mash.

== Etymology ==
The word purée in English is a loanword borrowed from the French purée, descendant from the Old French puree, meaning "made pure". The word can further be traced to the Latin pūrō.

== Common purées ==
Common purées include apples, plums, and other fruits smashed or mashed for their juice content.

- Baba ghanoush (eggplant)
- Bisque (shellfish)
- Ful medames (fava beans)
- Hummus (chickpea)
- Legume soups such as pea soup, bean soup, lentil soup
- Mkhali (colloquially pkhali), Georgian vegetable dips thickened with walnut paste
- Purée Mongole (a mixed pea and tomato soup)
- Pimento (olives)

These fruits and vegetables are often served as purées:

- Apple
- Arracacha
- Avocado
- Banana
- Carrot
- Cassava
- Cauliflower
- Mango
- Pea
- Peach
- Pickled cucumber
- Pineapple
- Potato (cf. Mashed potato)
- Pumpkin
- Rutabaga
- Squash, buttersquash, etc.
- Sweet corn
- Taro purée, called 芋泥 in Teochew cuisine
- Tomato

== See also ==
- Gruel
- Guacamole
- Mashing
- Muesli
- Peanut butter
- Pesto
- Polenta
- Potato masher
- Red bean paste
- Saag
