= Cooking base =

Cooking base, sometimes called soup base, is a concentrated flavoring compound used in place of stock for the creation of soups, sauces, and gravies. Since it can be purchased rather than prepared fresh, it is commonly used in restaurants where cost is a more important factor than achieving haute cuisine. Veal and chicken base are common, as are beef, lamb and vegetable base. Soup base is available in many levels of quality. Today, these products are produced in low and very low sodium varieties, seafood and vegetarian.

== See also ==
- Stock cube
- Instant soup
