= Editan (soup) =

Nigerian vegetable soup

- Type: Soup
- Region or state: Cross River State
- Associated cuisine: Nigeria
- Main ingredients: Vegetables

Editan soup is a vegetable soup that originates from the Efik People of Cross River State in South Nigeria. It is popularly known amongst the Cross River State people and Akwaibom State people. The soup is made from Editan leaf, a bitter leaf. Before being cooked the bitterness must be squeezed out.

The editan leaf is believed to have medicinal values.

== See also ==
- Afang Soup
- Atama Soup
- Edikan Ikong
- Nigerian Cuisine
- List of Soups
- List of vegetable soups
