= Garden patience =

Garden patience is a common name for several species of docks (Rumex):

- Rumex crispus (curly dock), native to Europe and western Asia
- Rumex patientia (patience dock)
