= Atama soup =

Vegetable soup

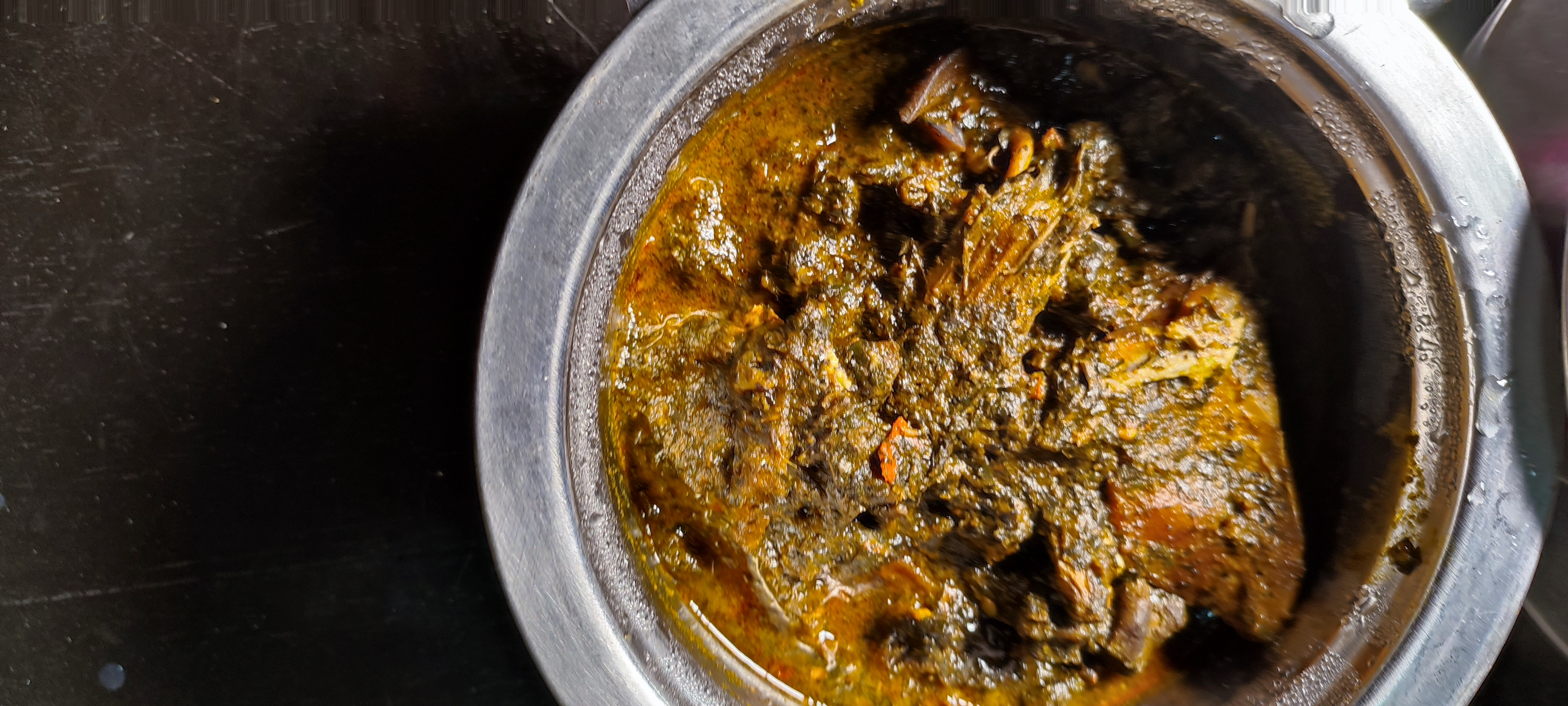
- Alternative names: Abak atama
- Type: Soup
- Region or state: Akwa Ibom State
- Associated cuisine: Nigeria
- Main ingredients: Vegetable, palm nut, atama leaf

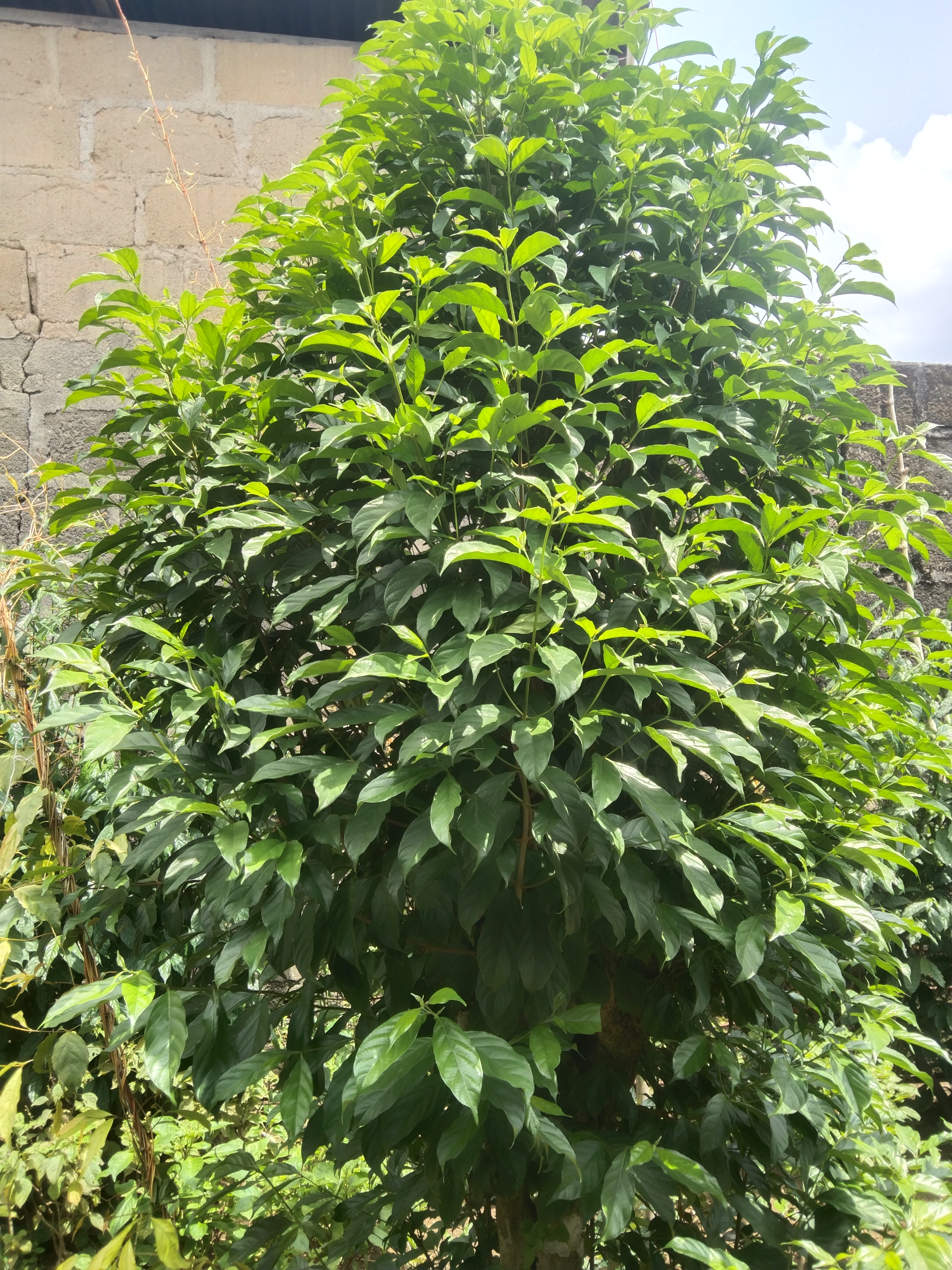
Atama plant

Atama soup or amme-eddi is a palm-fruit vegetable soup that originates from the Ibibio people of Akwa Ibom state, Urhobo and Isoko people of Delta State in South South Nigeria. It is a popular food among the Delta, Cross River and Akwa Ibom State people of Nigeria. The Urhobo people of Delta state called it amme-edi or banga soup ("banga" being a colloquial Nigerian-English term). The soup is made from palm fruit-pulp that is derived from palm fruit; the extracted palm-pulp is base primary ingredient for the soup. Atama soup (Abak Atama) is thick and dark brown in color. It is normally prepared with Atama leaf, choice of protein like fresh meat or dry meat(mostly bush meat), dry fish, fresh fish and sometimes shrimp(dry or fresh), periwinkle as added proteins for more enhanced flavor. Ingredients: primary ingredients are Fresh Atama leaf,fresh palm-pulp sourced from palm fruit, salt and pepper and secondary ingredients which are decided based on preference of the cooker are onions, salt, pepper(different kinds of pepper are preferences) and different kinds of spices could be added depending on the cooker preferred or desired taste or flavor. This soup could be styled into different flavors depending on cooking preferences. Every added ingredient could drastically change the taste of the food.

== See also ==
- Afang (soup)
- Edikang ikong
- Editan (soup)
- Nigerian cuisine
- List of soups
- Vegetable soup
- List of vegetable soups
