= Pickle soup =

Soup prepared with pickled vegetables

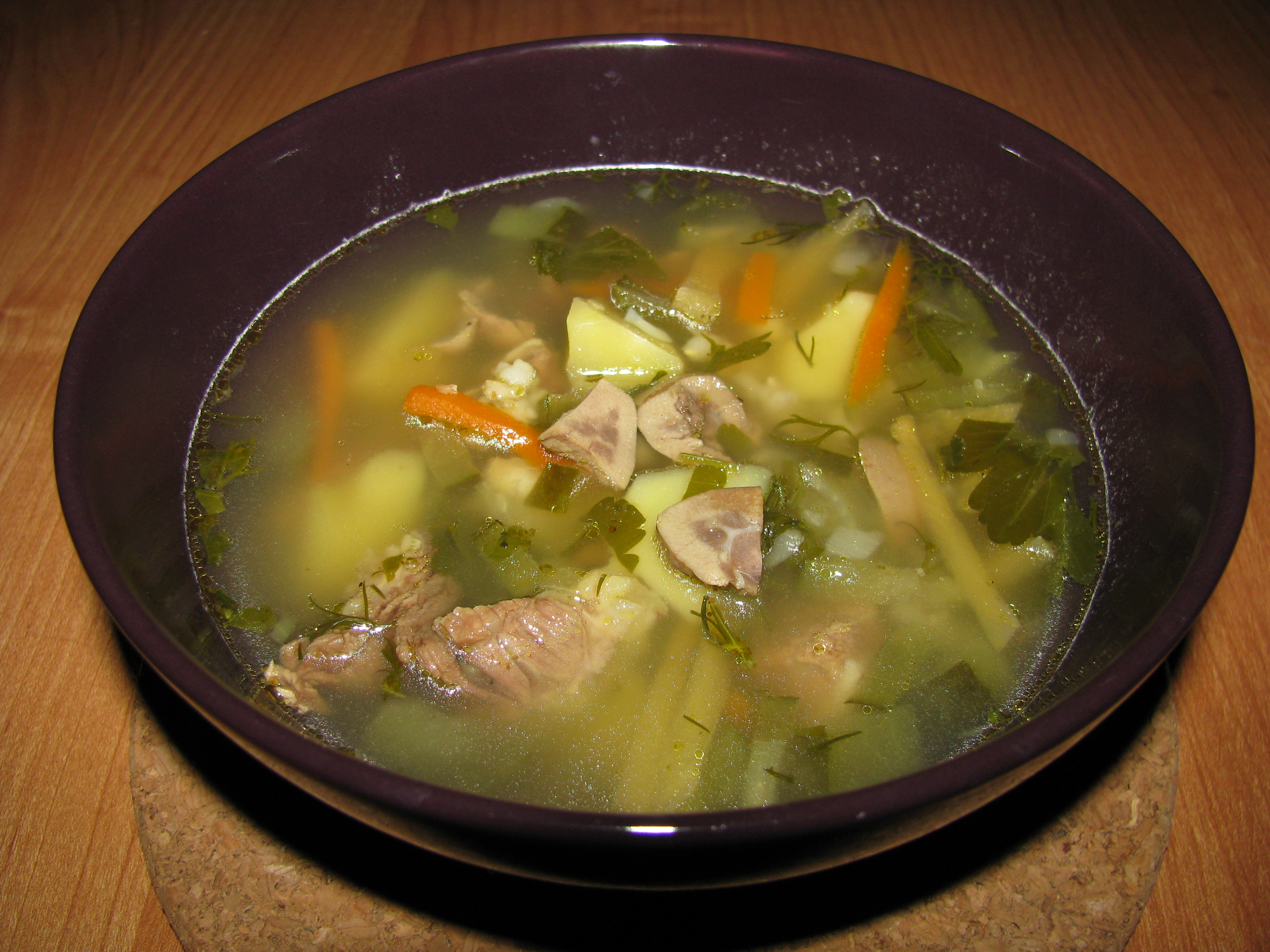
Rassolnik

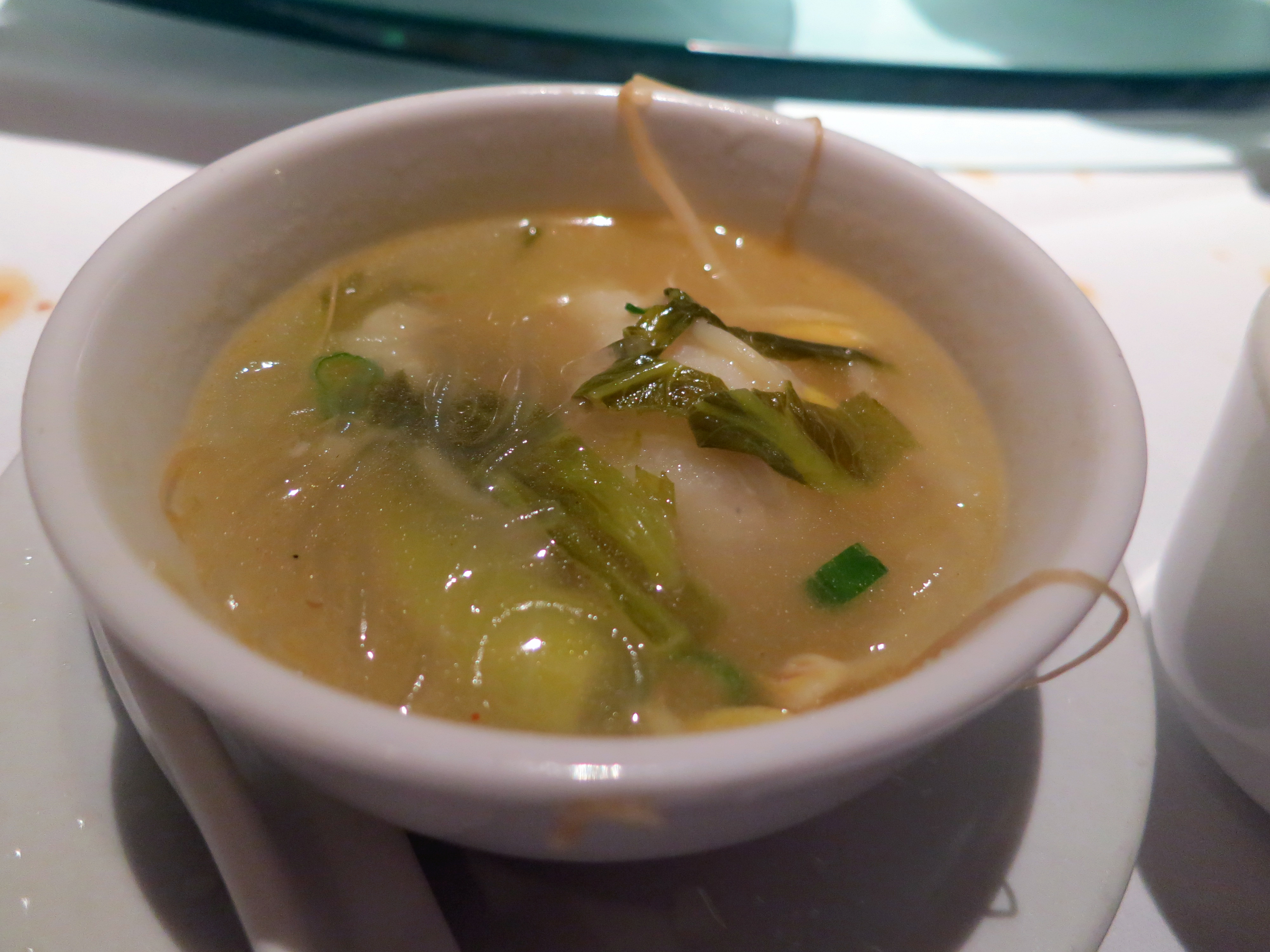
Pickled mustard and fish filet soup

Pickle soup is a style of soup prepared with various types of pickled vegetables. Dill pickle soup is a variety of pickle soup prepared with pickled cucumber. Some versions use grated dill pickle in their preparation. Some restaurants in the United States offer this dish to their patrons, such as Polish grocery stores and restaurants in Chicago's south side.

== Varieties ==
A similar dish is rassolnik, a sour soup in Russian cuisine prepared with primary ingredients of stock, dill pickle, veal or lamb kidneys, pearl barley and potato. The key part of rassolnik is the pickle brine called rassol in Russian. Additional ingredients may include beef stock, carrot, leek, salt, pepper, and others. It may be served garnished with sour cream.

Zupa ogórkowa is a traditional Polish dill pickle soup prepared with Polish-style brine-cured pickles. Some versions use standard dill pickles or kosher dill pickles rather than the specific Polish variety. Primary ingredients include broth, pickles and potato. The soup's flavor can vary depending on the type of broth that is used, such as vegetable broth or meat broth. Pork bones may be used to prepare a meat-based broth. Additional ingredients can include celery, carrot, garlic, cream, egg yolk, dill, salt and pepper.

== See also ==
- List of pickled foods
- List of soups
- List of vegetable soups
