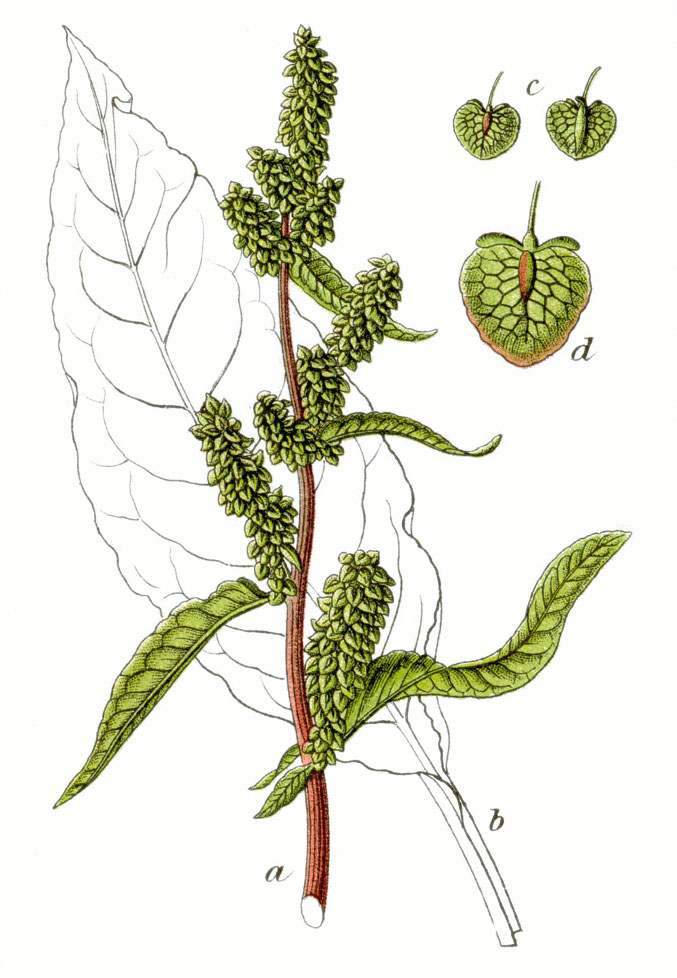
- Patience dock

Scientific classification
- Kingdom: Plantae
- Clade: Embryophytes
- Clade: Tracheophytes
- Clade: Angiosperms
- Clade: Eudicots
- Order: Caryophyllales
- Family: Polygonaceae
- Genus: Rumex
- Species: R. patientia

Binomial name
- Rumex patientia L. Sources: UniProt, ITIS, IPNI

= Rumex patientia =

Species of flowering plant

Rumex patientia, known as patience dock, garden patience, herb patience, or monk's rhubarb, is a herbaceous perennial flowering plant belonging to the family Polygonaceae. In spring it is often consumed as a leaf vegetable and as a filling in pies in Southern Europe, especially in Bulgaria, North Macedonia, Turkey, Bosnia and Herzegovina and Serbia. It is also used in Romania in spring broths or sarmale.

== Uses ==
The leaves can be eaten raw or cooked, but do contain oxalic acid, so should not be eaten in excess (e.g. every day). The leaves can be used raw in salads, cooked in soups and stews, or layered in baked dishes like lasagna. The leaves are high in minerals, and can be harvested at any time.

== Gallery ==
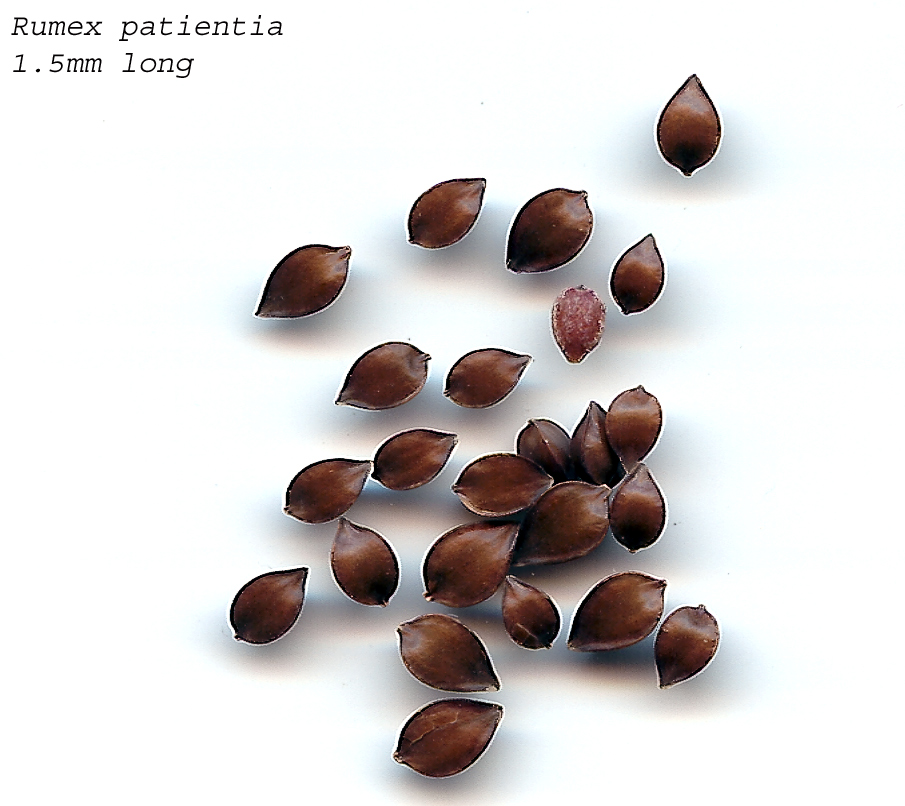
Seeds

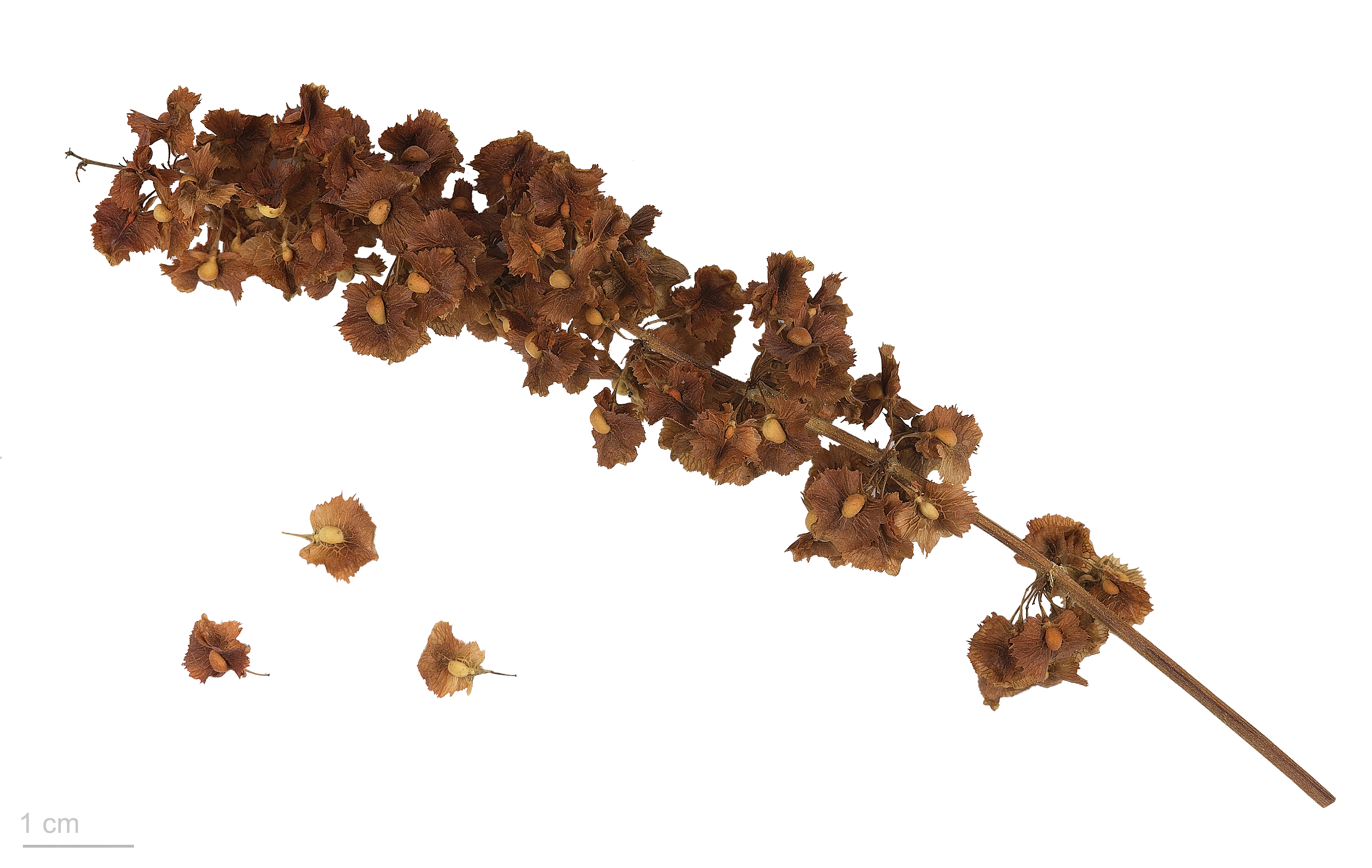
Rumex patientia - MHNT
