= Muâ-ínn-thng =

Taiwanese traditional soup made from tender jute leave

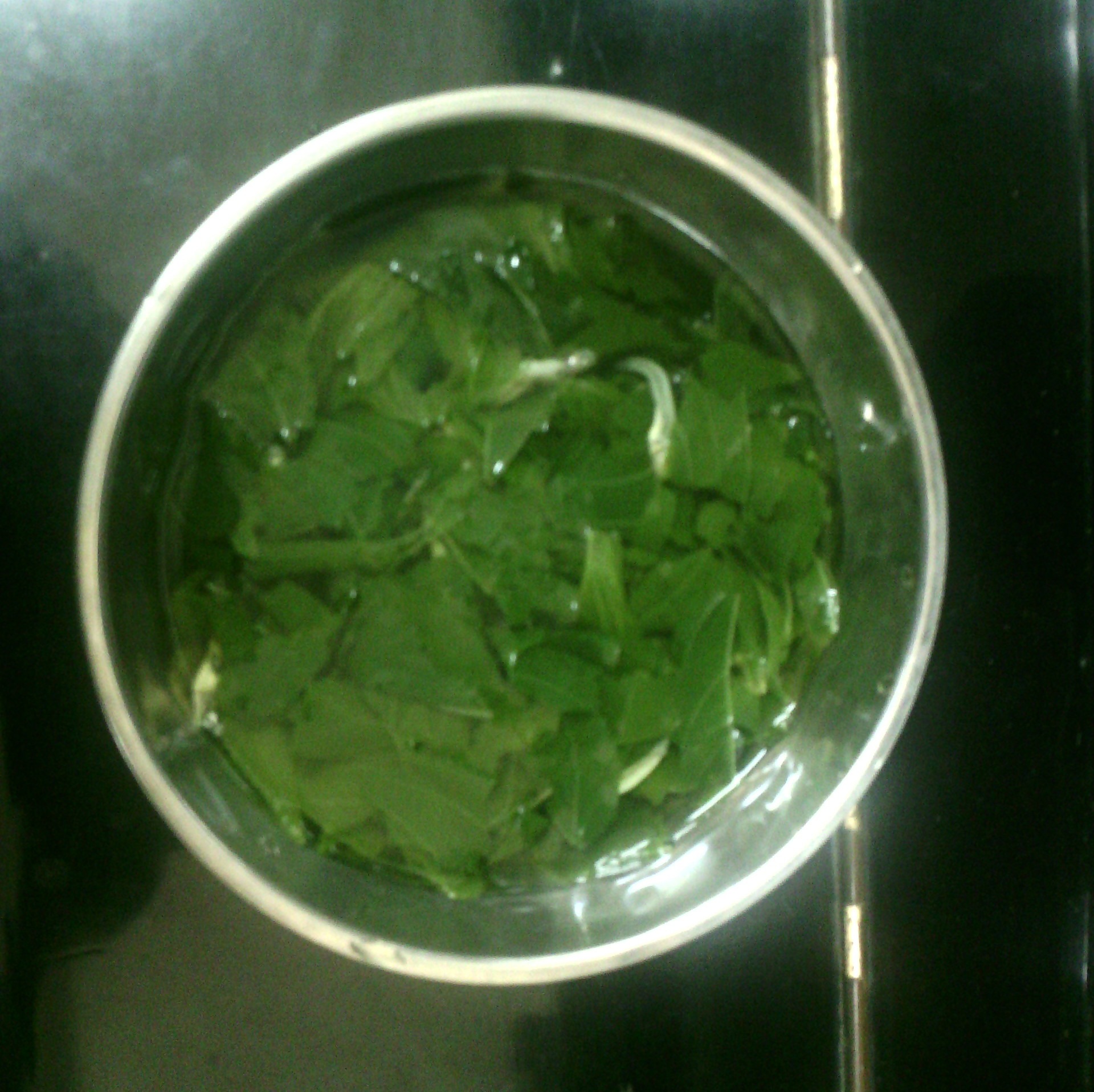
- Alternative names: Jute leave soup
- Type: Soup
- Course: Main
- Place of origin: Taiwan
- Serving temperature: Hot
- Main ingredients: Tender jute leaves

Muâ-ínn-thng (Chinese: 麻芛湯/麻薏湯; pinyin: Máwěitāng) is a traditional Taiwanese jute leaf soup widely enjoyed as a refreshing summer comfort food in Taichung. It is also a popular dish during the Dragon Boat Festival. The dish first gained international attention after being introduced in the novel Taiwan Travelogue by Yang Shuang-zi after it won the 2026 International Booker Prize.

Every family has their own unique way of preparing and eating the dish. Whereas most families add sweet potatoes and anchovies, some add water spinach to enhance the flavor.

The dish is prepared by first breaking off the upper stem to pick off the tender leaves. Then, the leaves are kneaded into small pieces against a woven bamboo pan and water is used to wash away the bitter sap until a ball of crushed leaf is formed at the bottom of the pan. Afterwards, water was boiled before the ball of leaves was loosened and added to the water. White foam on the surface formed from the dissolved leaves is subsequently removed before adding some salt.

During the Japanese colonial period, jute was mostly concentrated in central and southern Taiwan and was cultivated jute extensively. This was because the Japanese expored large quantities of rice and sugar from Taiwan that were transported in jute sacks. Therefore, the farmers figured they only needed to extract the fibers to weave sacks, and the remaining leaves could be consumed.

Many modern chefs are deterred by the tedious process of preparing the dish. Thus, convenient frozen packs and muâ-ínn powder have been developed. Traditionally regarded as "poor people's food", the dish is quietly entering the kitchens of Michelin-starred restaurants. Nutritionist regard the dish as a good source of calcium supplementation and blood sugar control.

== See also ==
- Taiwanese cuisine
- List of vegetable soups
