= Eru (soup) =

Cameroon soup

Eru is a vegetable from Cameroon. It is a specialty of the Bayangi people, of the Manyu departement in southwestern Cameroon. It is vegetable soup made up of finely shredded leaves of the eru or okok. The eru is cooked with waterleaf or spinach, palm oil, crayfish, and either smoked fish, cow skin (kanda) or beef.

This dish is traditionally eaten with fermented water-fufu or garri.

Eru Recipe

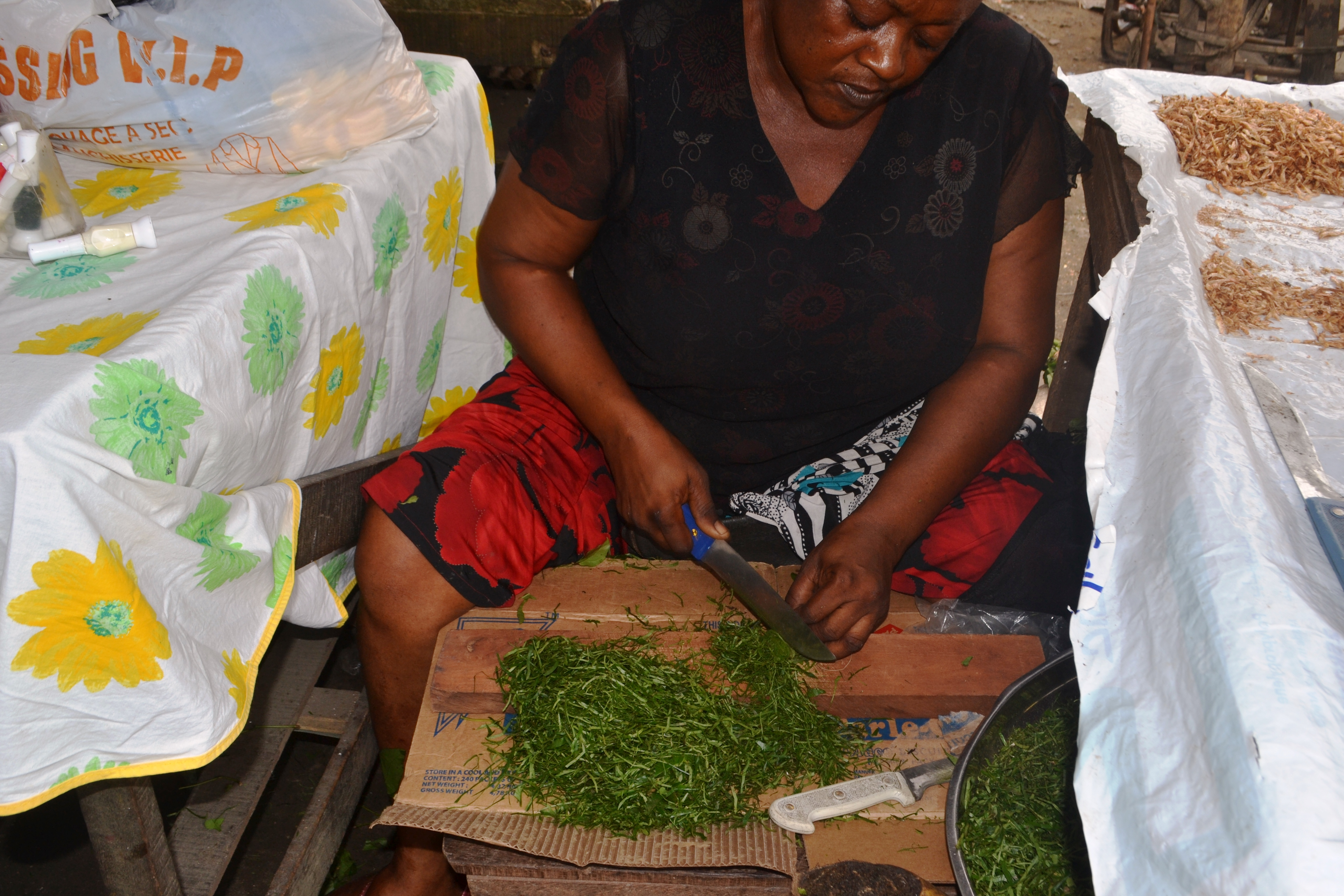
A woman slicing Eru leaves

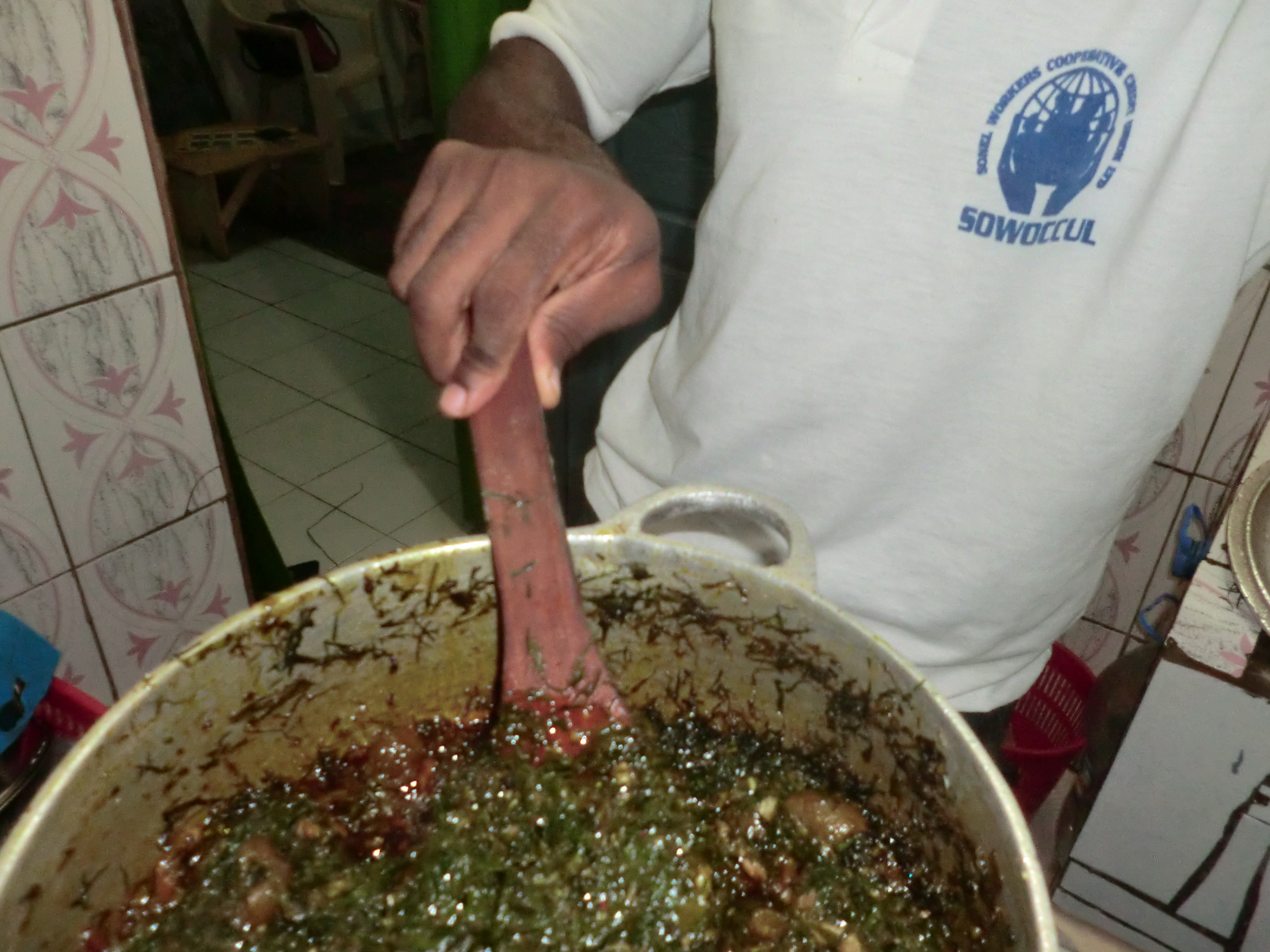
Cooking process

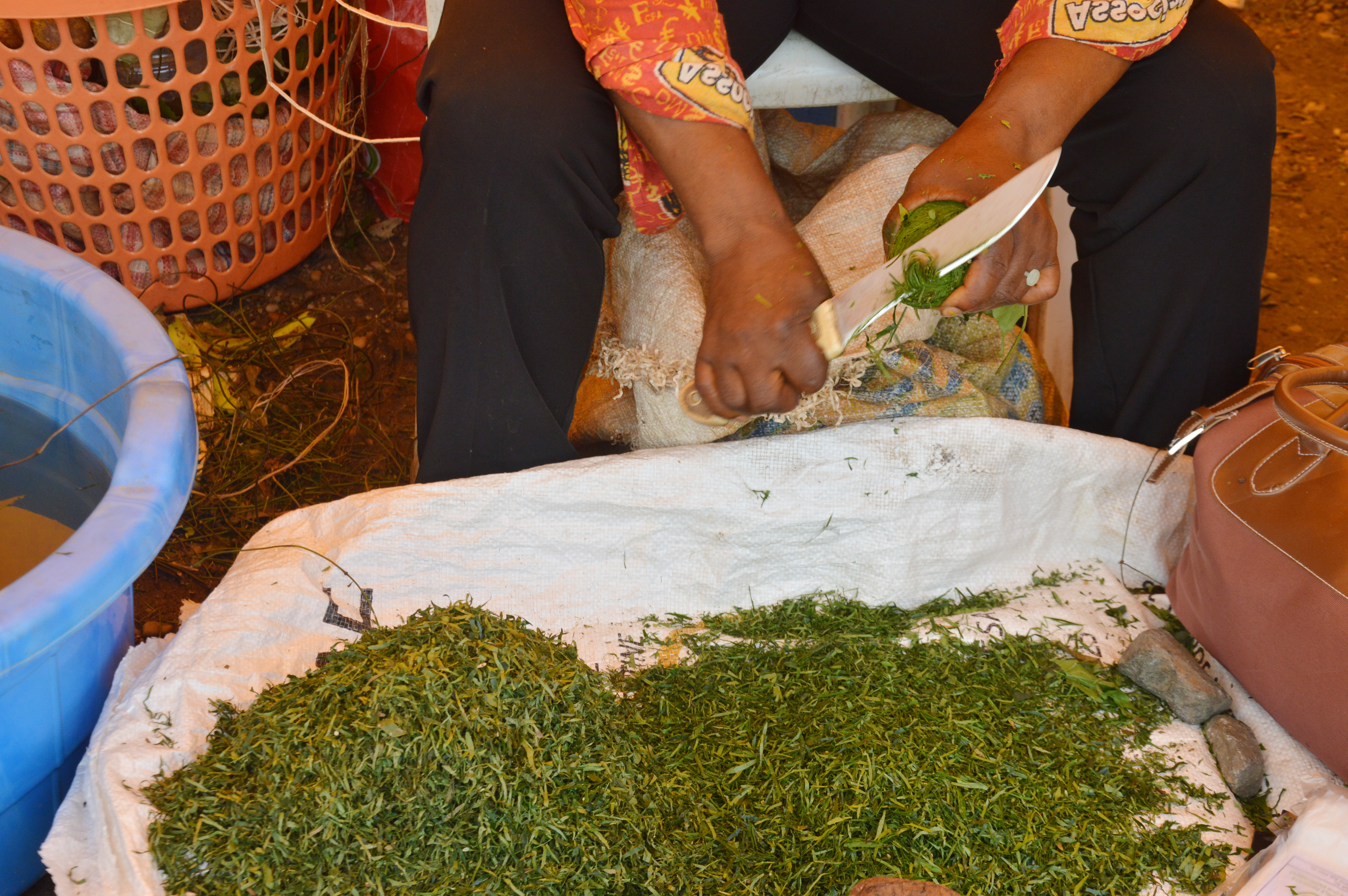

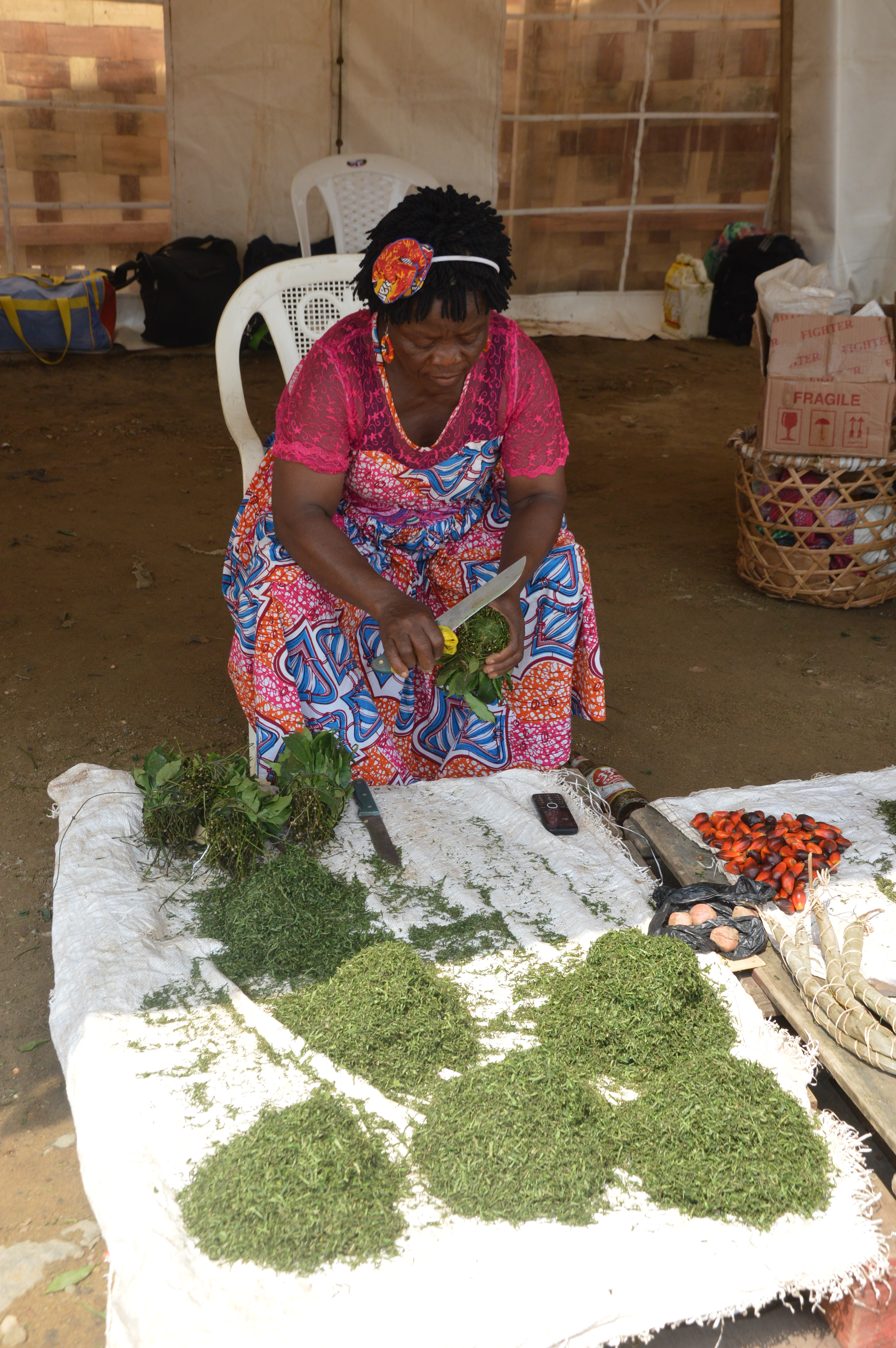
Eru leaves for sale

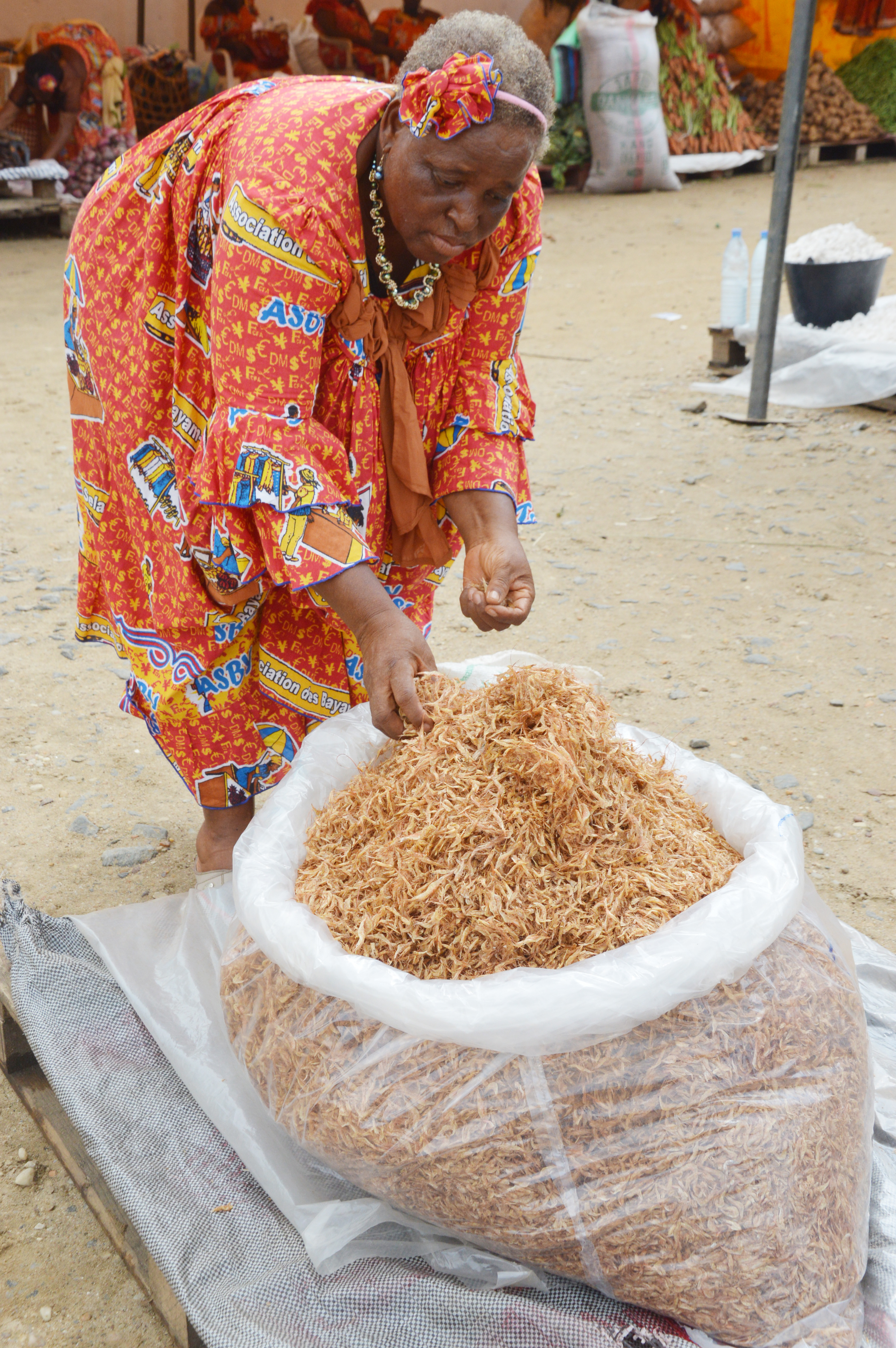
Crayfish used for cooking Eru soup

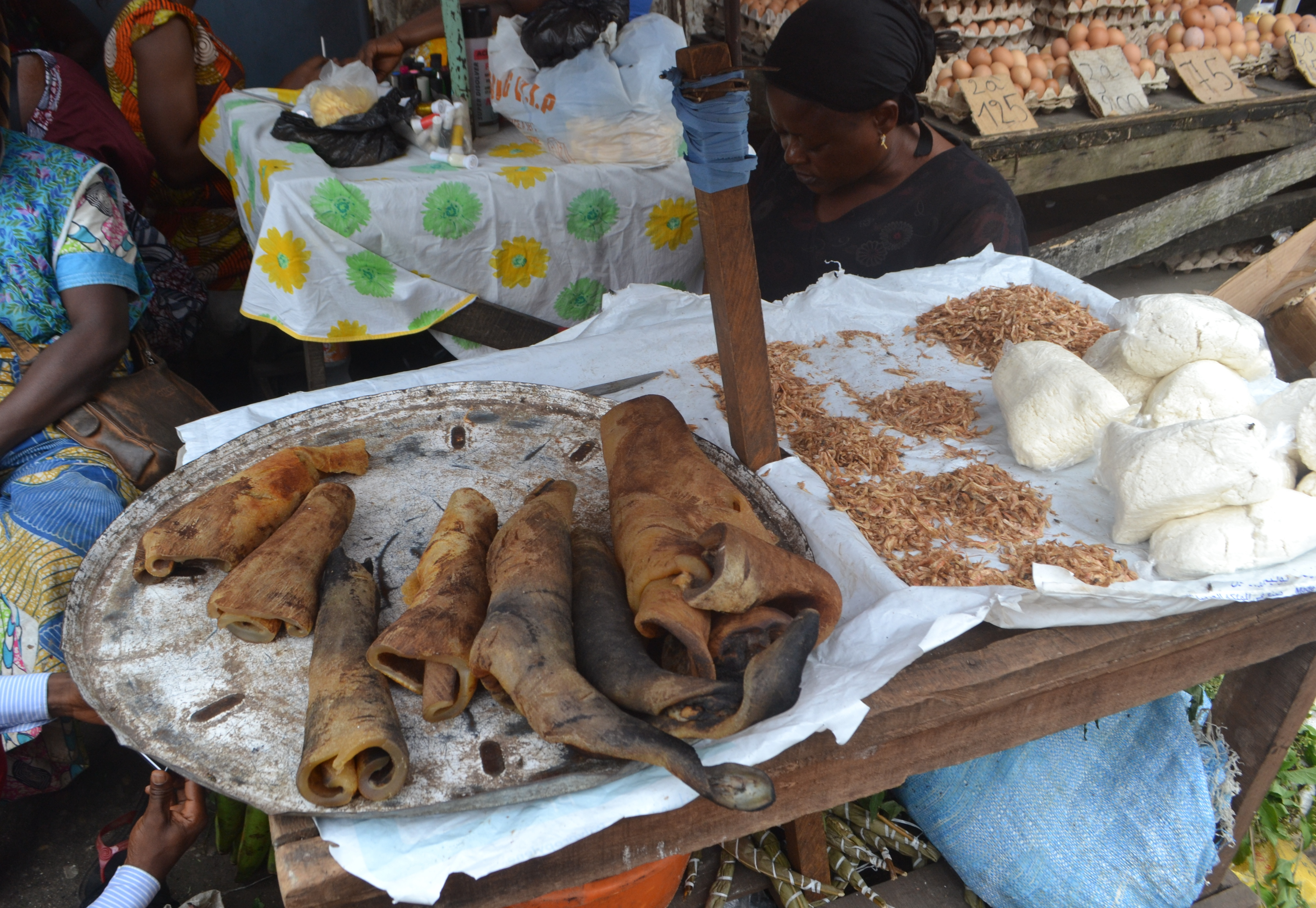
White fermented cassava flour locally called "water Fufu"

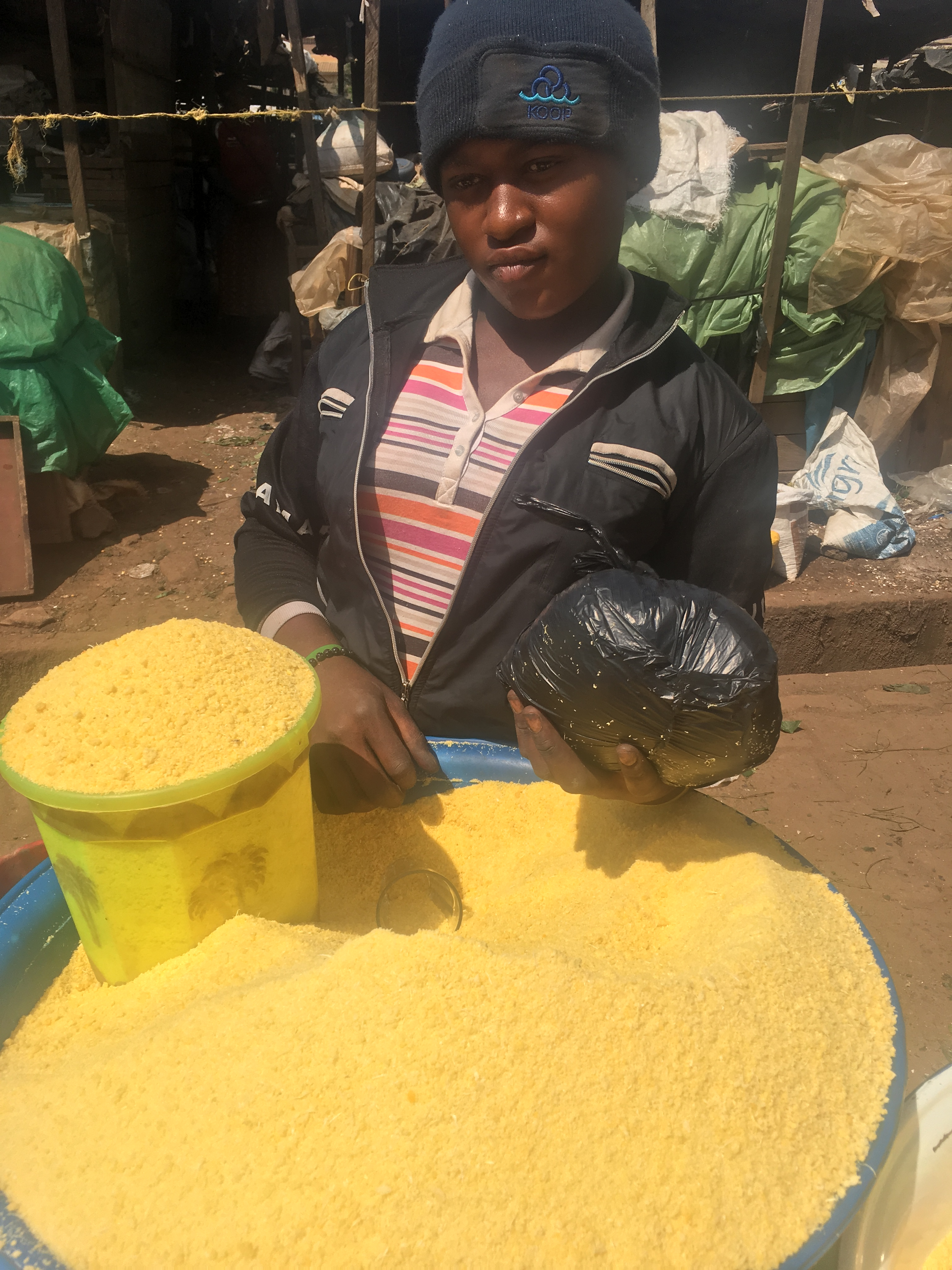
Cassava flour is eaten with Eru soup

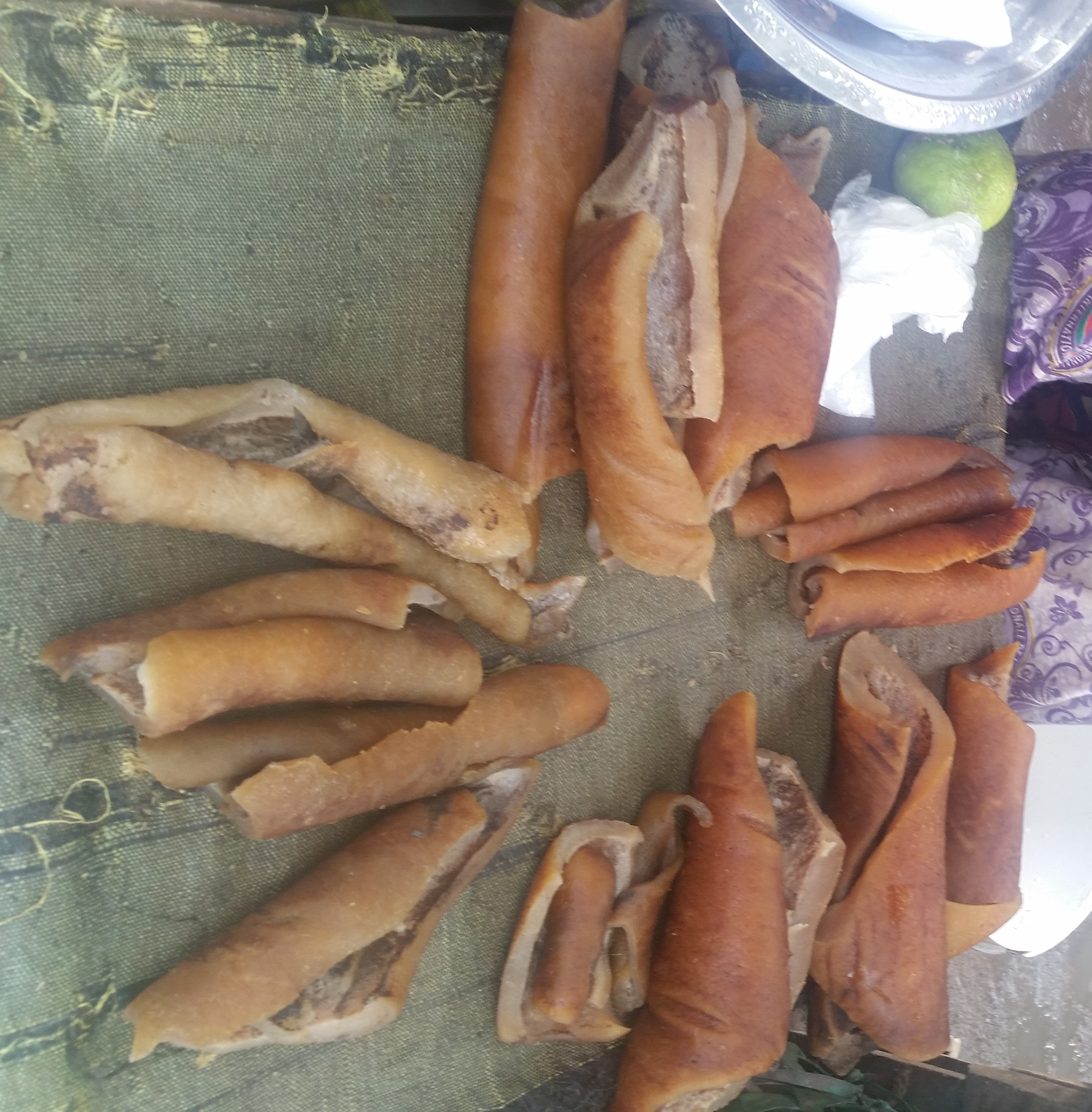
Cow skin locally called "canda"

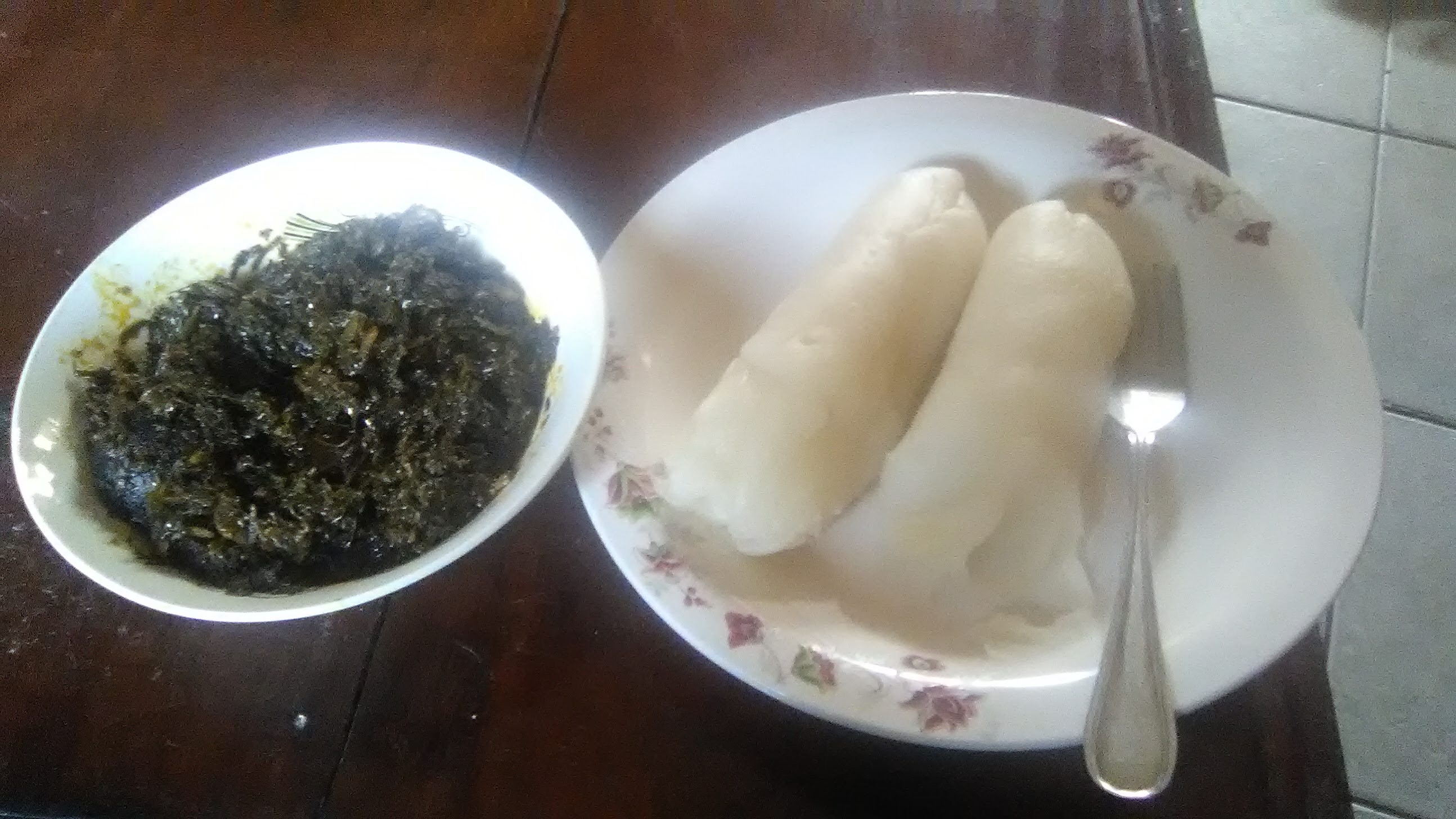
Lunch is ready! water fufu and Eru soup

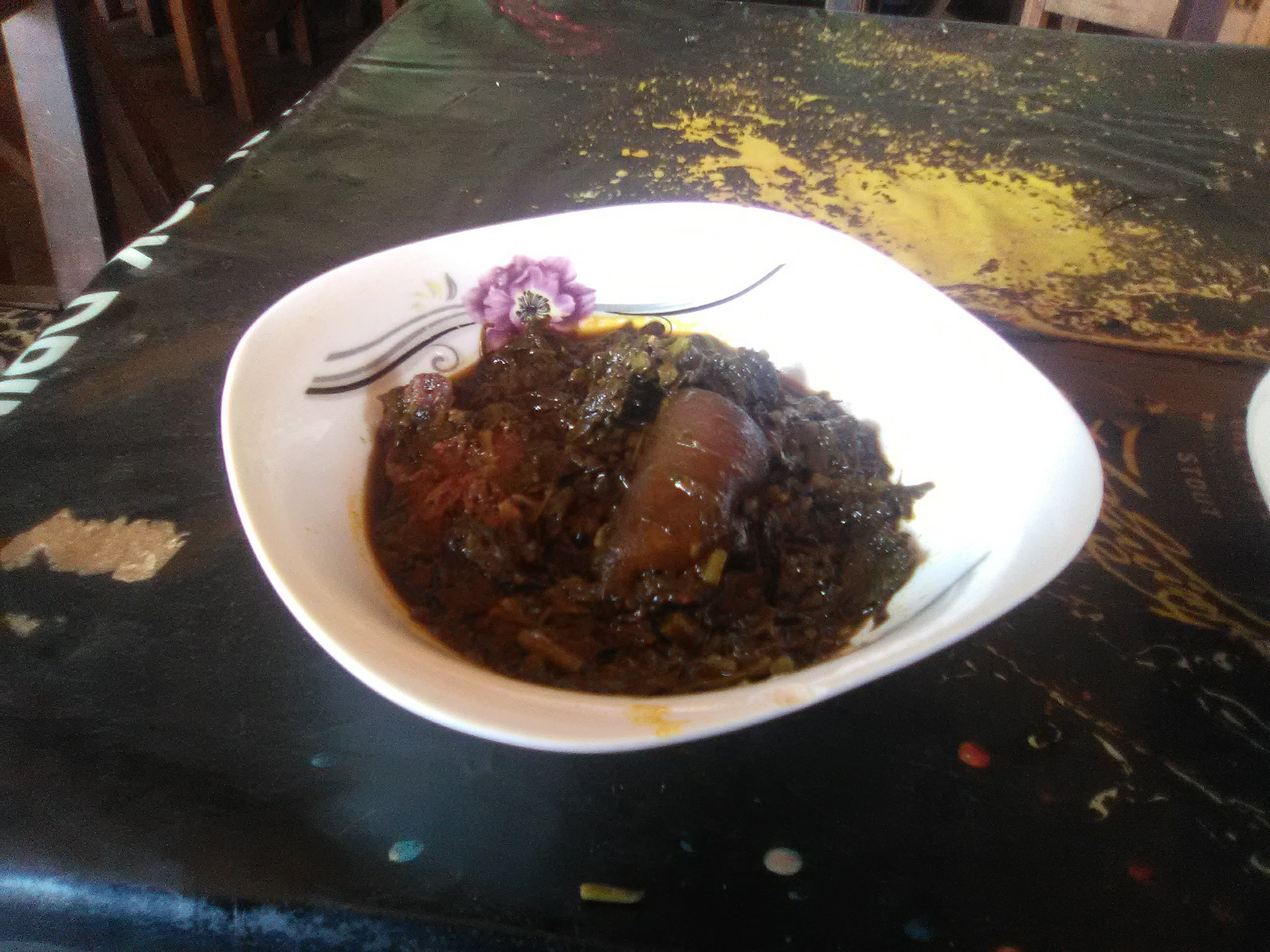
Cow skin in Eru soup

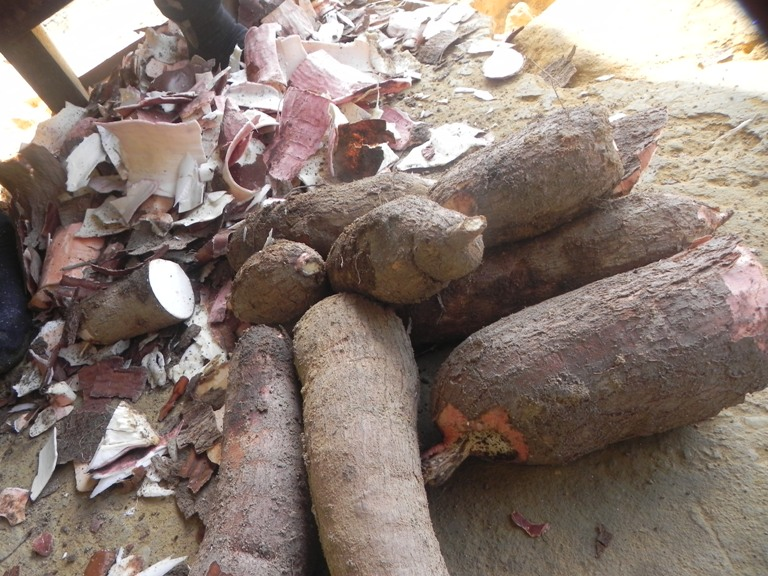
Cassava Tubers

== See also ==
- Cuisine of Cameroon
- List of African dishes
- List of vegetable soups
