= Lettuce soup =

Soup made with lettuce

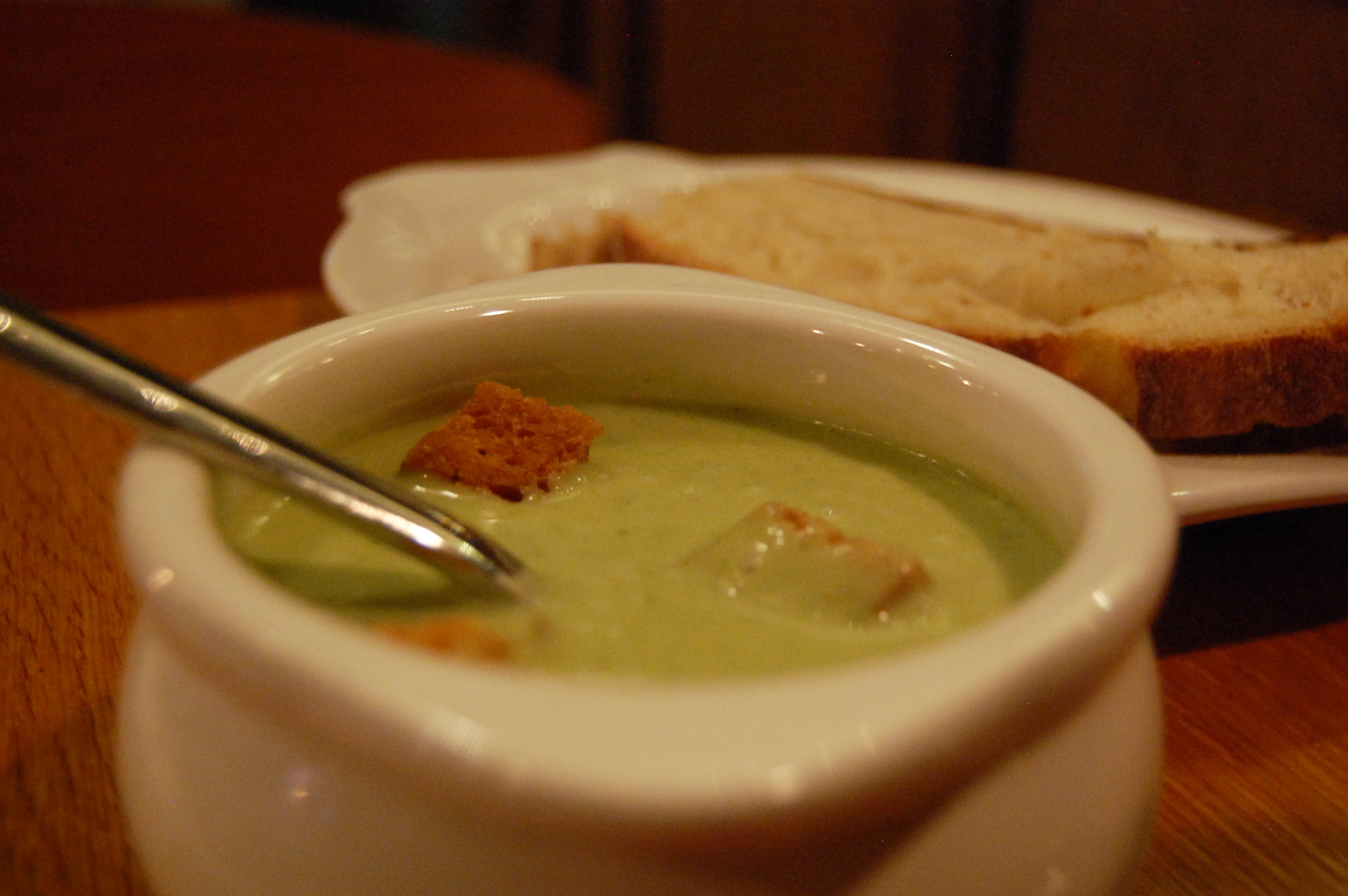
Butter lettuce soup with croutons

Lettuce soup is a soup prepared with lettuce as a primary ingredient. It may be prepared with additional ingredients, and some lettuce soups may use several cultivars of lettuce in their preparation. It is a part of French cuisine and Chinese cuisine. Cream of lettuce soup is a type of lettuce soup prepared using milk or cream. The soup may be served with toast or rolls as a side dish or with the soup atop them. It may be served as an appetizer, a side dish or as a main dish, and may be served hot or cold.

== Preparation ==
Lettuce is a primary ingredient, and several types of lettuce can be used, such as butter lettuce, romaine lettuce (also known as cos), Boston lettuce, green leaf lettuce and iceberg lettuce, among others. The lettuce may be chopped, torn, shredded or sliced into ribbons. Additional ingredients may include chicken stock, beef stock, cream, milk, wine, lemon juice, egg or egg yolk, meats, rice, potato, greens, sorrel, watercress, Swiss chard, escarole, peas, parsley (or dried parsley), bread crumbs, onion, shallot, garlic, salt and pepper, among others. Some preparations purée all of the ingredients together, and some preparations are strained in a sieve. Lettuce soup is sometimes served with toast or rolls, either as a side dish or with the soup poured upon it. Sometimes croutons or chopped bacon are used in the dish or to garnish it. In French cuisine, lettuce soup is usually served poured atop thin slices of lightly toasted French bread. Some versions are served cold. Total calories can vary depending on the ingredients used. For example, versions that use milk may have fewer calories than those that use cream.

== Dishes ==
Chinese versions include Cantonese dishes such as "minced chicken with lettuce soup" and "fish with lettuce soup".

== See also ==
- Lettuce sandwich
- List of Chinese soups
- List of French soups and stews
- List of soups
- List of vegetable soups
