= Cream of broccoli soup =

Soup prepared with broccoli, stock, and milk or cream

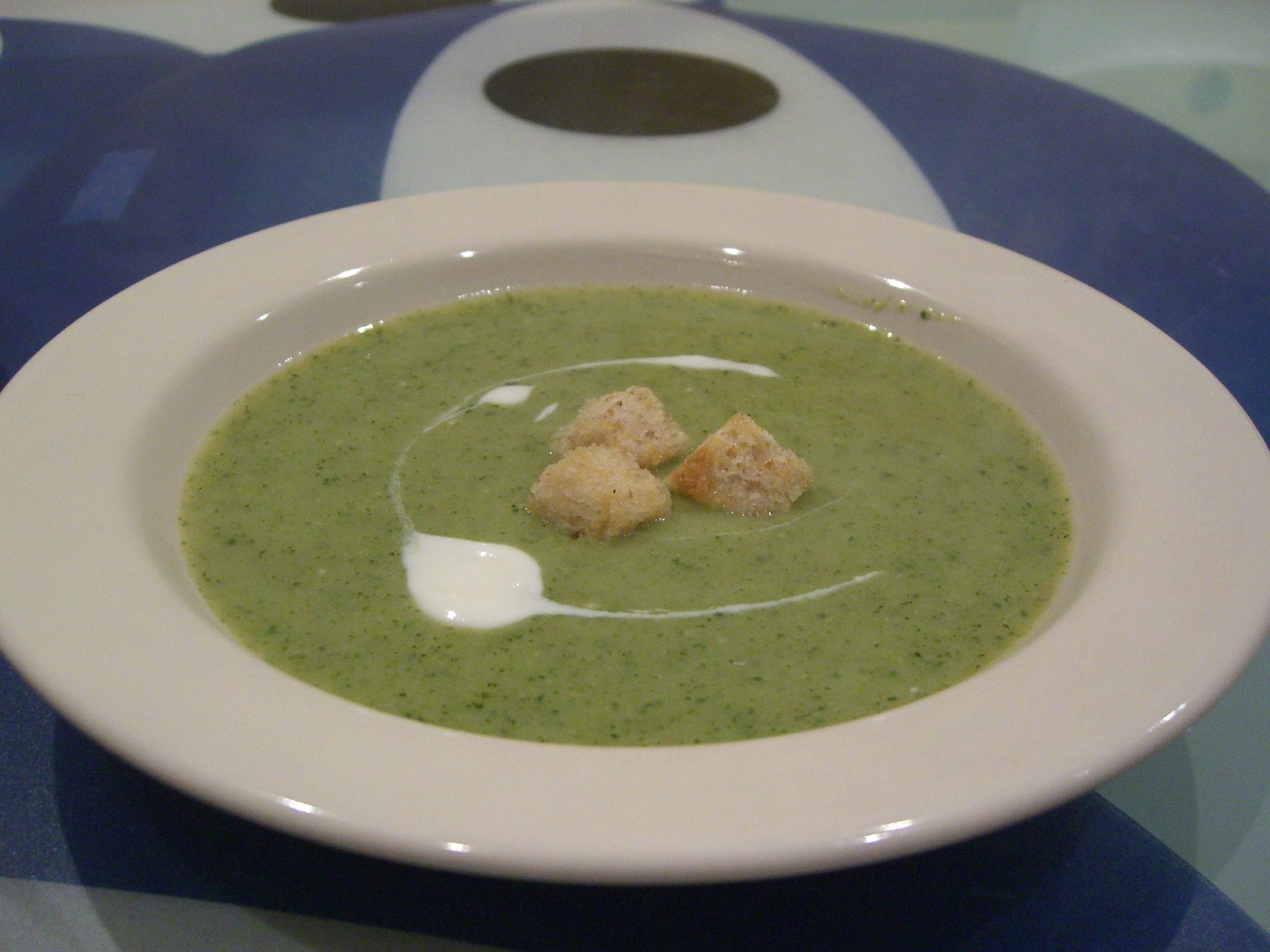
- A cream of broccoli soup prepared with purée de broccoli
- Type: Soup

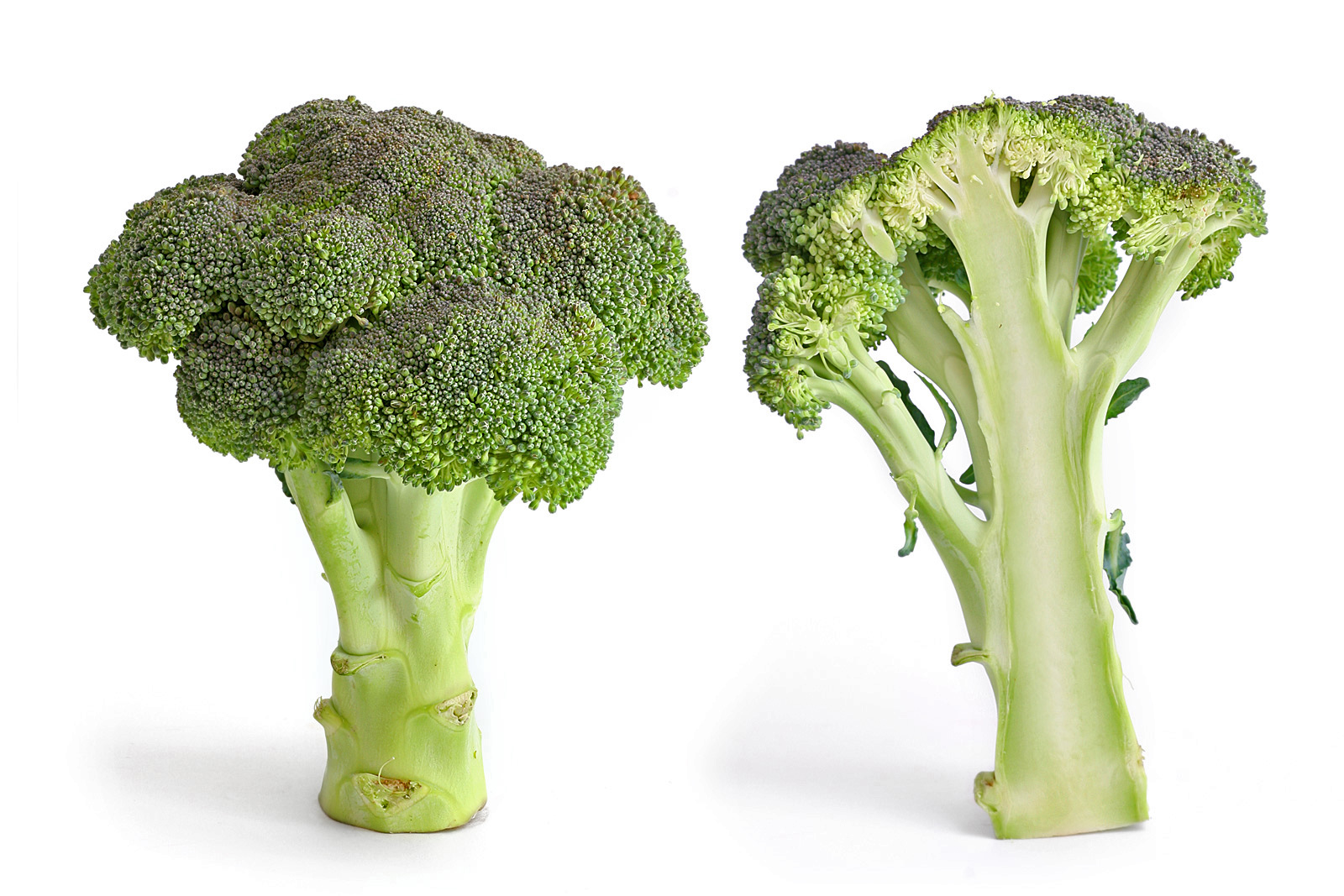
Broccoli is a main ingredient in cream of broccoli soup.

Cream of broccoli soup is a soup prepared with broccoli, stock, and milk or cream as primary ingredients. Ingredient variations exist, as do vegan versions. It is also a commercially, mass-produced soup, often sold in cans. Several recipes use canned cream of broccoli soup as an ingredient, such as its use with cooked chicken dishes and as a sauce.

== Ingredients and preparation methods ==
Primary ingredients are broccoli, stock and milk or cream. The broccoli used may be chopped, sliced into small florets or puréed, and some preparations combine both chopped and pureed broccoli. Some versions may use frozen broccoli, and the soup may be thickened using a roux. Additional ingredients may include onion, celery, chicken broth, half and half, egg yolk, herbs such as parsley, thyme and bay leaf, salt, pepper and others. It is sometimes served garnished with croutons or broccoli florets.

== Mass production ==
Mass-produced commercial varieties of cream of broccoli soup are produced by various food manufacturers, such as the Campbell's, which debuted the soup in 1990. The Campbell Soup Company devised it to be used as a soup and as an ingredient to be used in other dishes. During the time of its debut in 1990, The Campbell Soup Company published a booklet of broccoli dishes that are prepared using their canned cream of broccoli soup, which was offered free to consumers through the provision of a stamped, self-addressed envelope to the company. Some of the dishes in the booklet included "Easy broccoli bake" and "Two-step chicken broccoli divan". After this soup's debut, the company devised and marketed additional cream of broccoli-style soups, such as broccoli cheese soup, chunky chicken broccoli cheese soup and cream of chicken and broccoli soup.

== See also ==
- List of cream soups
- List of soups
- List of vegetable soups
- Vegetable soup
