= Edikang ikong =

Soup native to the Efiks in Nigeria

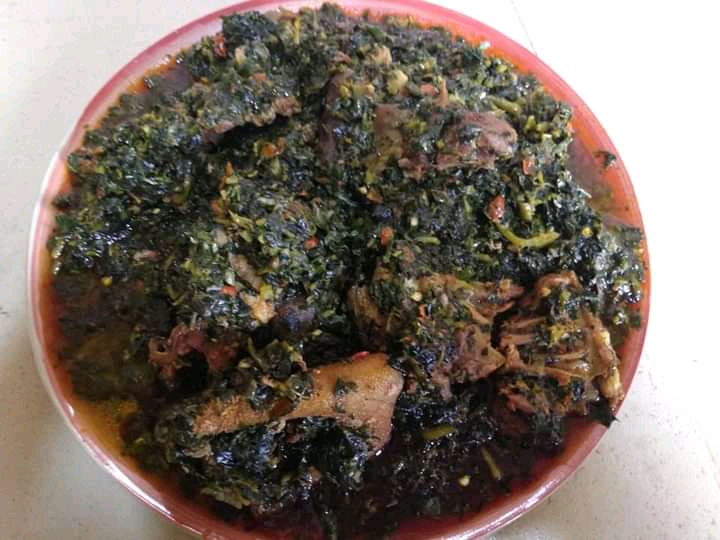
Edikang ikong

Edikang ikong is a vegetable soup made with ikong ubong that originated among the Efik people of Cross River State and Ibibio people of Akwa Ibom State in Nigeria It is considered to be a delicacy among some Nigerians, and is sometimes served during occasions of importance. Edikang ikong is a nutritious soup and expensive to prepare, and has been described as being mostly eaten by rich people in Nigeria. Ingredients used in edikang ikong include beef and dried fish, bush meat, crayfish, shaki (cow tripe), kanda, pumpkin leaves, water leaves, ikong ubong, onion, periwinkle, palm oil, salt and pepper.

After preparation, edikang ikong is typically served with fufu, wheat flour, eba, or pounded yam.

== See also ==
- List of soups
- List of vegetable soups
- Nigerian cuisine
