= List of vegetable soups =

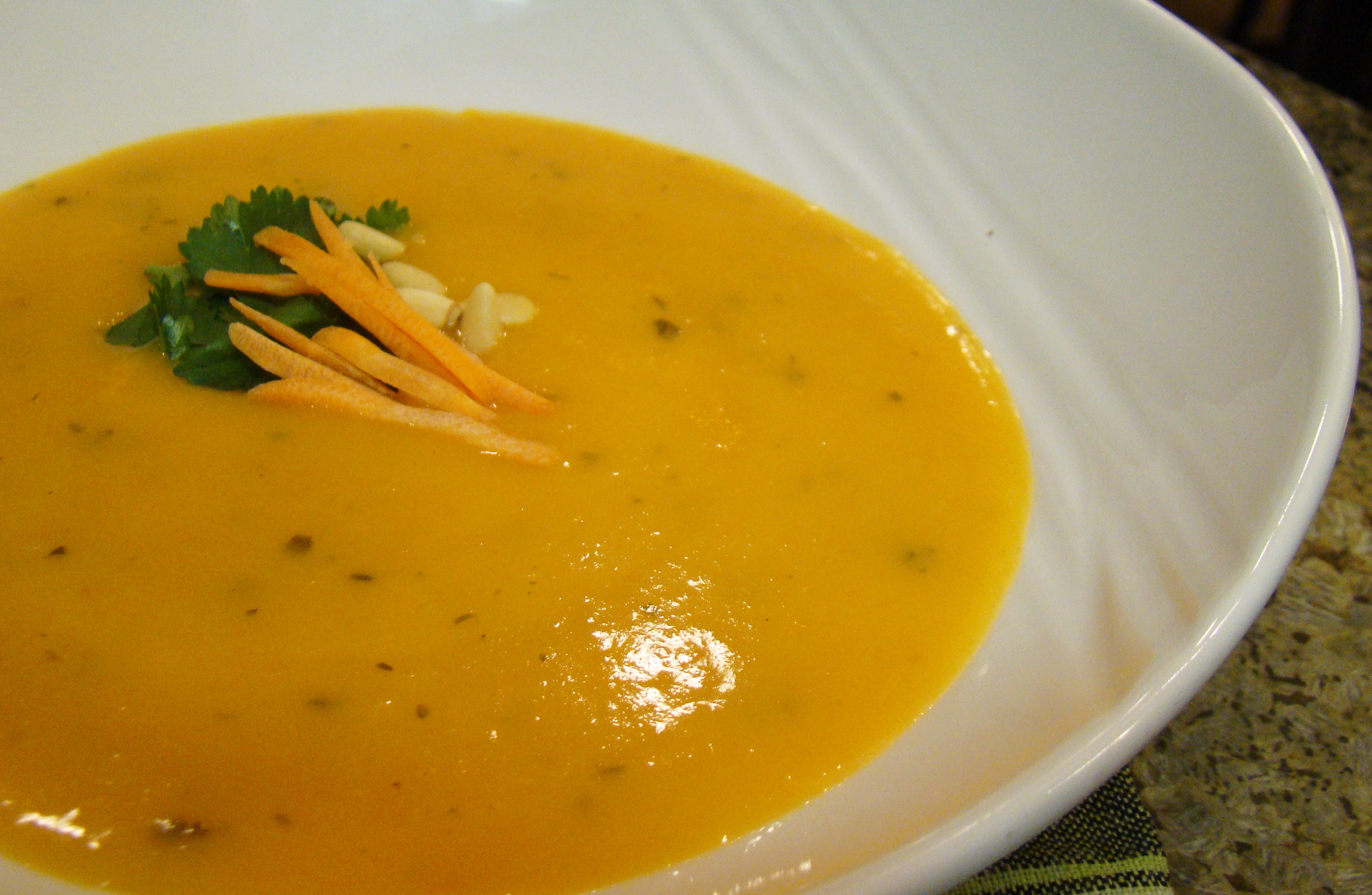
Cream of carrot soup

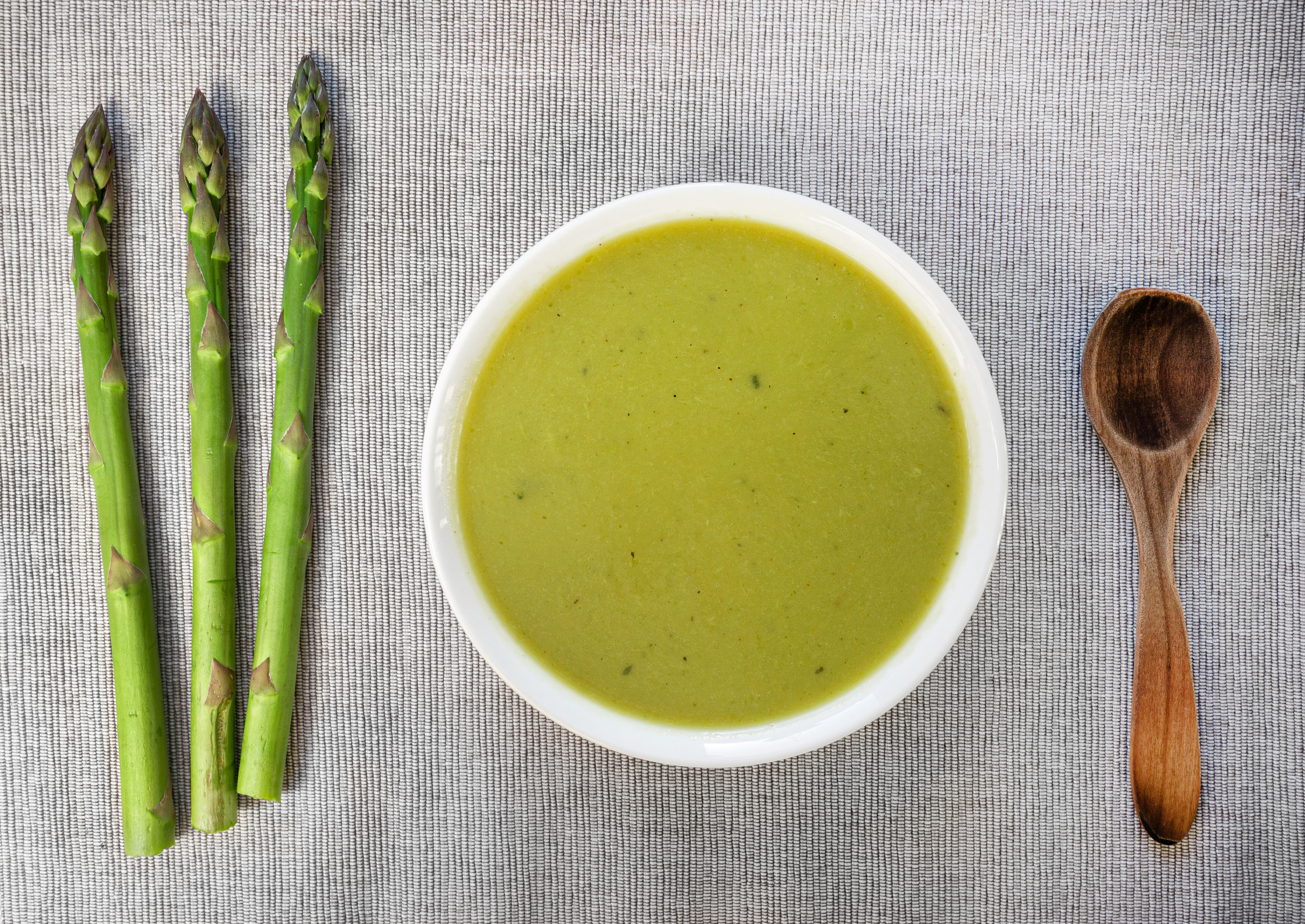
Asparagus soup

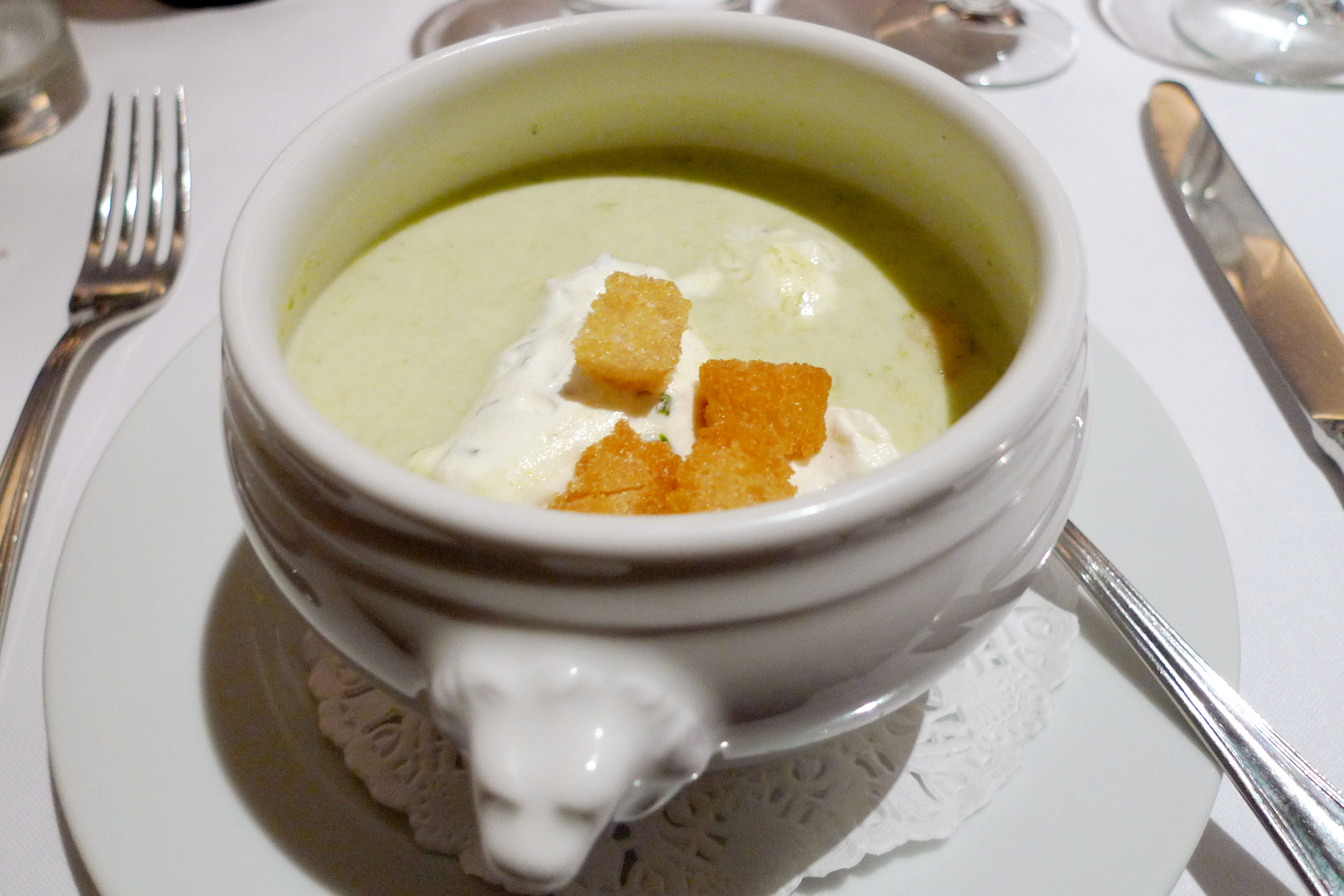
Potato and leek soup

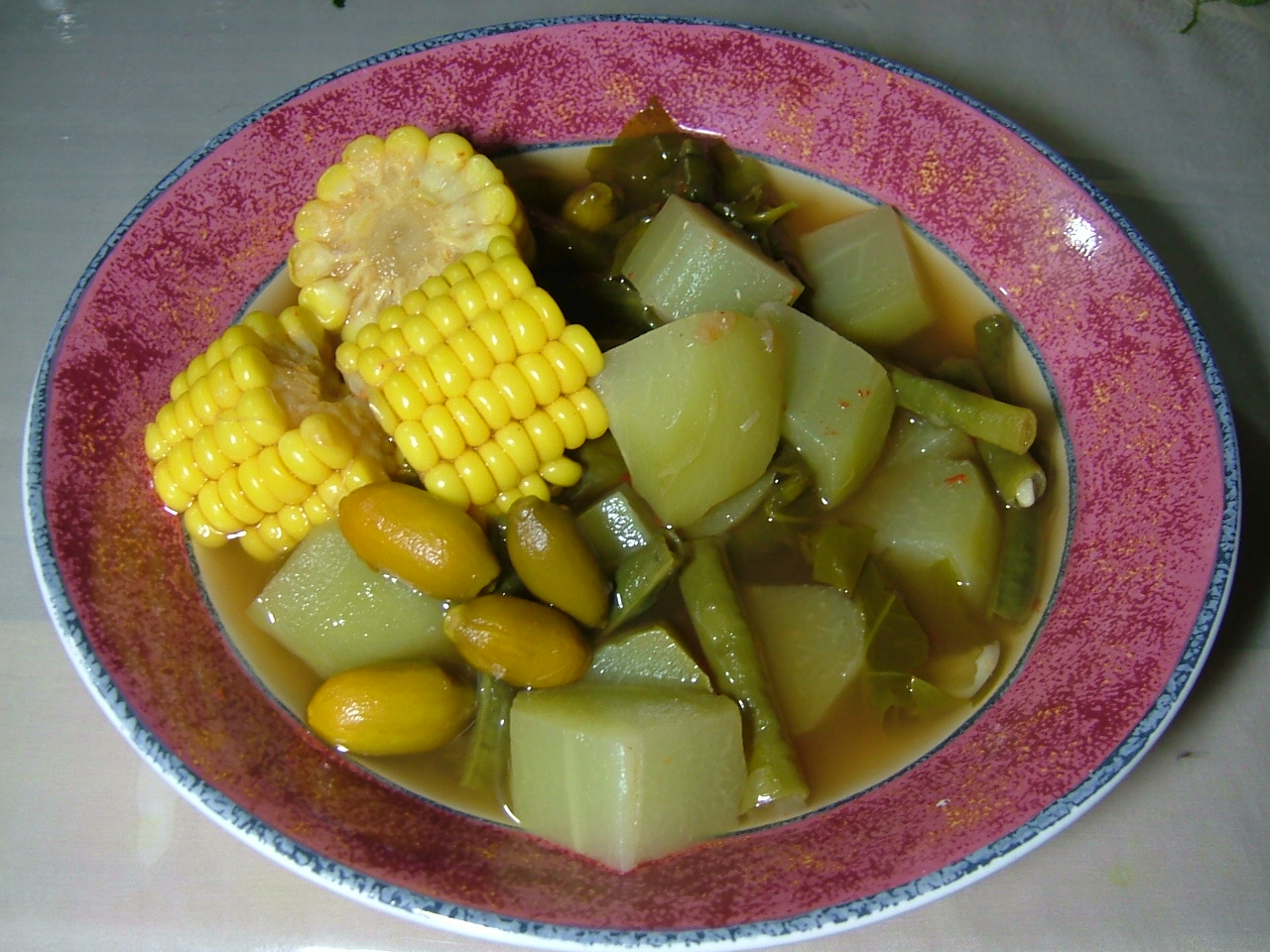
Sayur asem

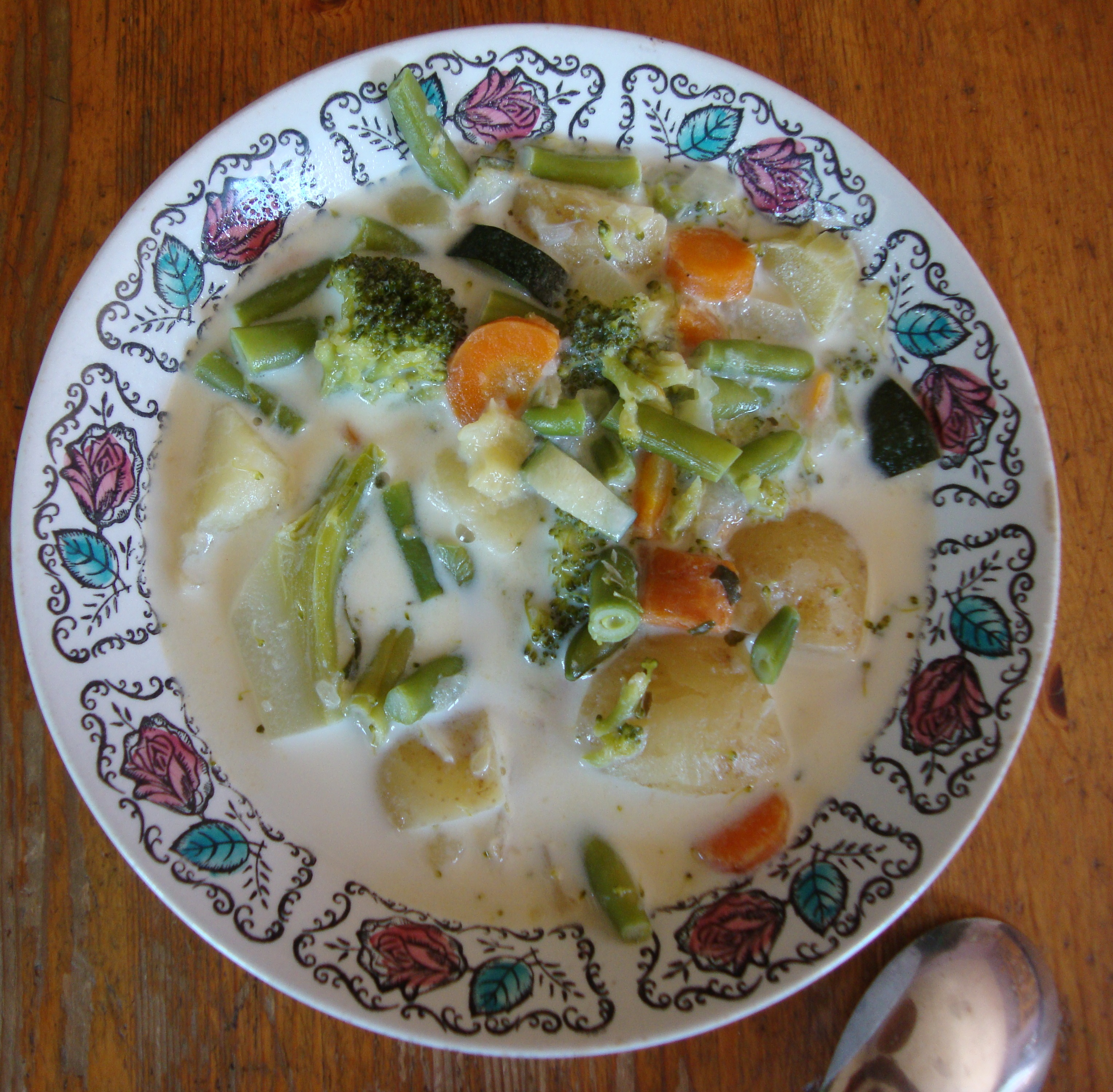
Summer soup

This is a list of vegetable soups. Vegetable soup is a common style of soup prepared using vegetables and leaf vegetables as primary ingredients.

== Vegetable soups ==
- Atama soup – A vegetable and palm nut soup that originates in South Nigeria
- Afang – Vegetable soup originating from southern Nigeria
- Borscht – Eastern European sour soup
- Cabbage soup – Prepared using sauerkraut or white cabbage
  - Shchi – Russian-style cabbage soup
- Caldo verde – Portuguese soup made with potatoes and collard greens
- Carrot soup – Soup prepared with carrot as a primary ingredient
- Corn chowder – Creamy corn soup from the United States
- Cream of asparagus soup – Soup prepared with asparagus, stock, and milk or cream
- Cream of broccoli soup – Soup prepared with broccoli, stock, and milk or cream
- Cream of mushroom soup – Type of soup
- Cream of sorrel soup – Traditional French springtime food
- Cucumber soup – Traditional Polish and Lithuanian soup made from sour, salted cucumbers and potato
- Editan – South Nigerian soup made from the bitter editan leaf
- Eru – A specialty of the Bayangi people, of the Manyu region in southwestern Cameroon, prepared using finely shredded leaves of the eru
- Gazpacho – Spanish cold soup dish
- Hodge-Podge
- Hot and sour soup – A variety of soups from several Asian culinary traditions; some are meat-free
- Kawlata – Traditional Maltese vegetable soup
- Kenchin-jiru – Japanese soup prepared using root vegetables and tofu
- Kesäkeitto – Finnish traditional vegetable soup made with vegetables, butter and milk
- Kusksu – An old Maltese soup made primarily from seasonal broad beans
- Leek soup – Vegetable-based soup dish
- Lettuce soup – Soup made with lettuce
- Minestrone – Thick soup of Italian origin made with vegetables, often with pasta or rice added. Common ingredients include beans, onions, celery, carrots, stock, and tomatoes
- Muâ-ínn-thng – Soup made from jute leave
- Nettle soup – Soup dish made with stinging nettles
- Okra soup – Soup prepared with okra
- Onion soup – Type of vegetable soup
  - French onion soup – The modern version of this soup originates in Paris, France, in the 18th century, made from beef broth, and caramelized onions. It can also be prepared as a vegetarian dish.
- Patriotic soup – A soup boiled with stir-fried leaf vegetables and edible mushrooms. Created in the Guangdong Province of China during the Mongol conquest of the Song dynasty and named by Emperor Bing of Song.
- Pea soup – Soup made from dried peas
- Pickle soup – A style of soup prepared with various types of pickled vegetables
  - Rassolnik – A traditional Russian soup made from pickled cucumbers, pearl barley, and pork or beef kidneys A vegetarian variant of rassolnik also exists, usually made during Lent.
- Ribollita – Tuscan bread soup, a hearty potage made with bread and vegetables
- Sayur asem – Indonesian tamarind dish. Common ingredients are peanuts, young jackfruit, melinjo, bilimbi, chayote, long beans, all cooked in tamarind-based soups and sometimes enriched with beef stock.
- Sayur lodeh – A soup prepared from vegetables in coconut milk, common in Indonesia, but most often associated with Javanese cuisine
- Sinabawang gulay – Filipino vegetable soup made with leafy vegetables (usually moringa leaves) and various other vegetables in a broth seasoned with seafood stock or patis (fish sauce)
- Sorrel soup – Also known as shchav, green borscht, or green shchi
- Spinach soup – Soup prepared using spinach
- Spring soup – Soup made with fresh ingredients that are only in season for a short period during spring
- Tomato soup – Soup made with tomatoes
- Vichyssoise – Thick French soup made of boiled and puréed leeks, onions and potatoes
- Watercress soup
Vegetable soups

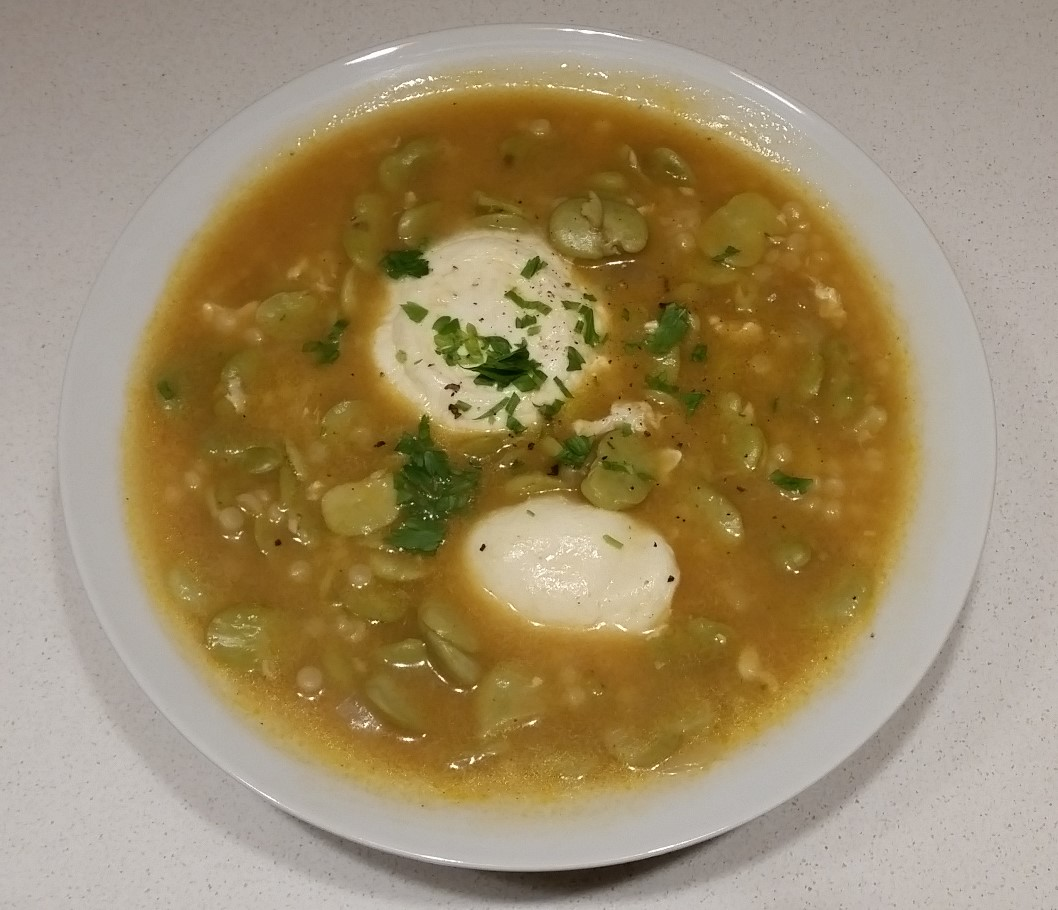
Maltese kusksu

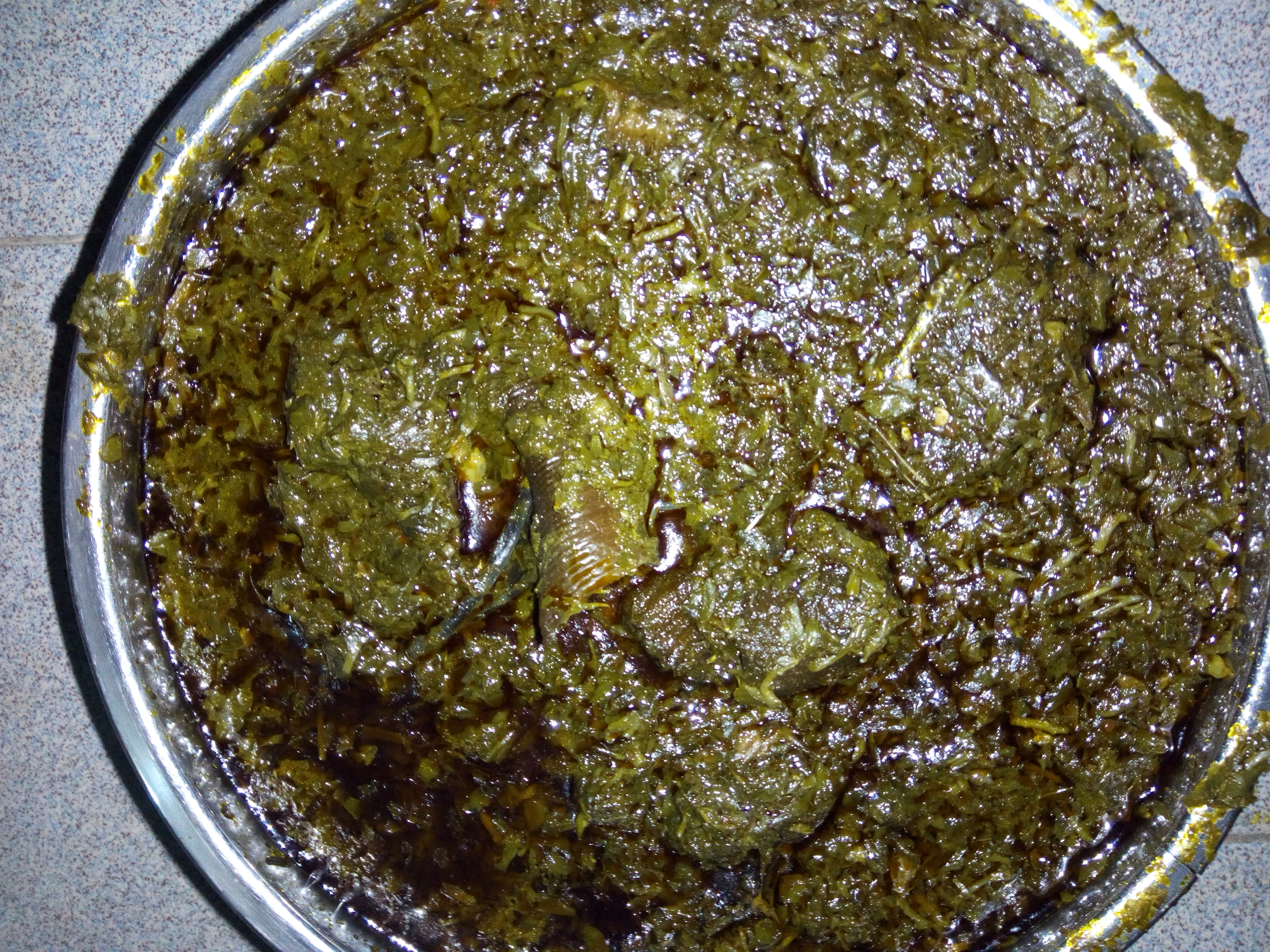
Afang

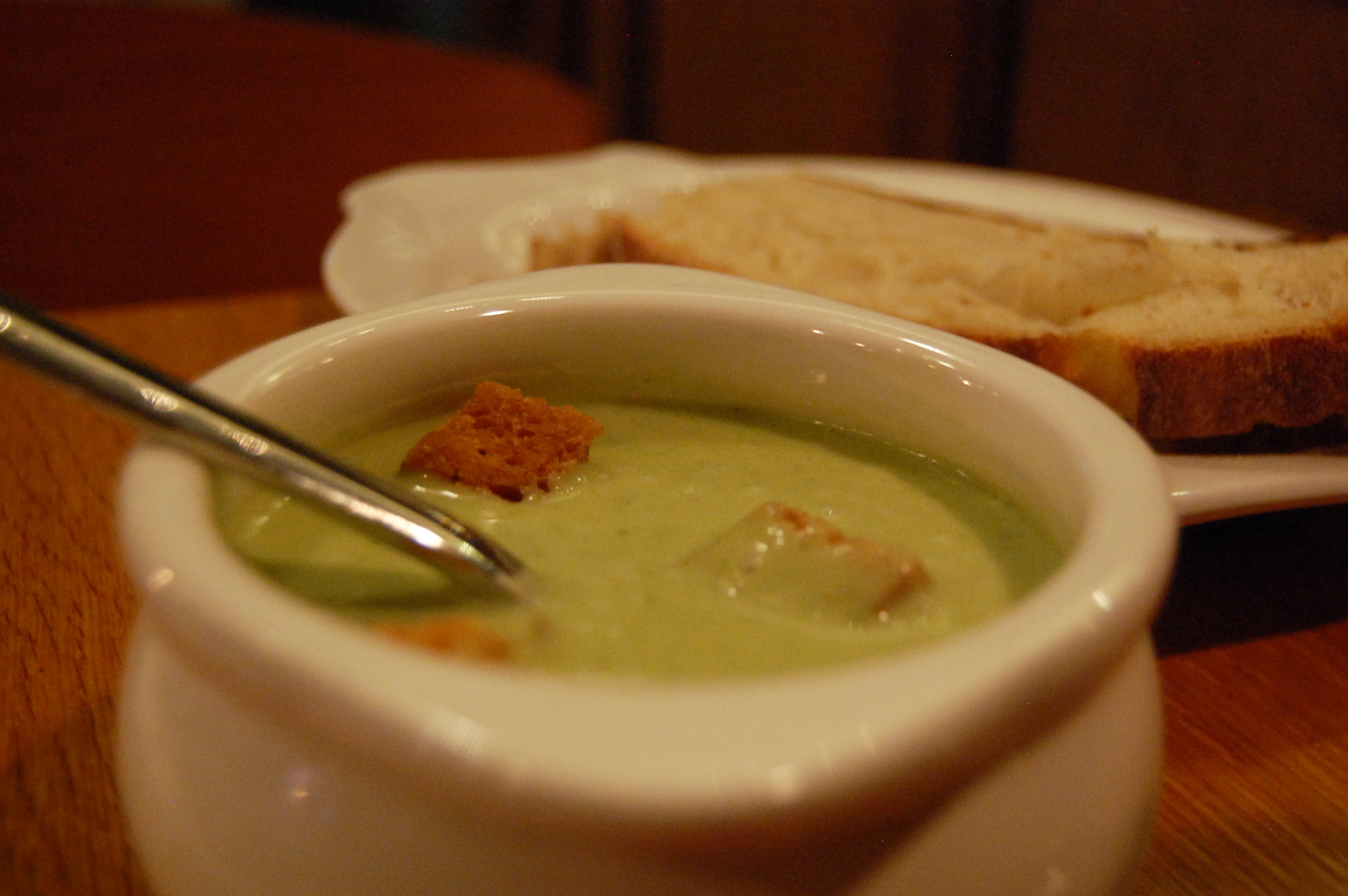
Lettuce soup with croutons

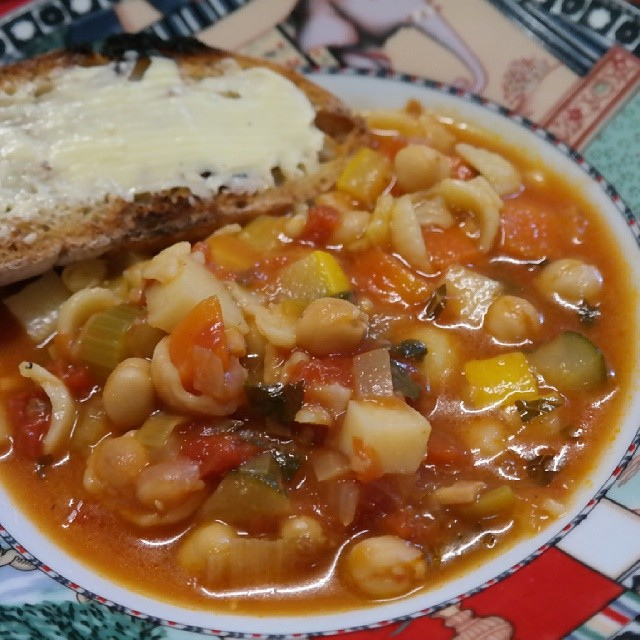
Minestrone with bread

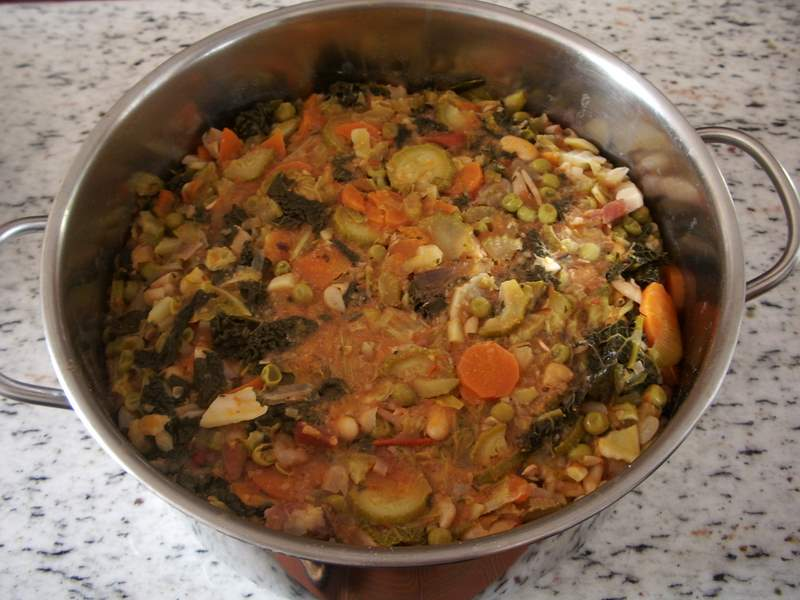
Ribollita

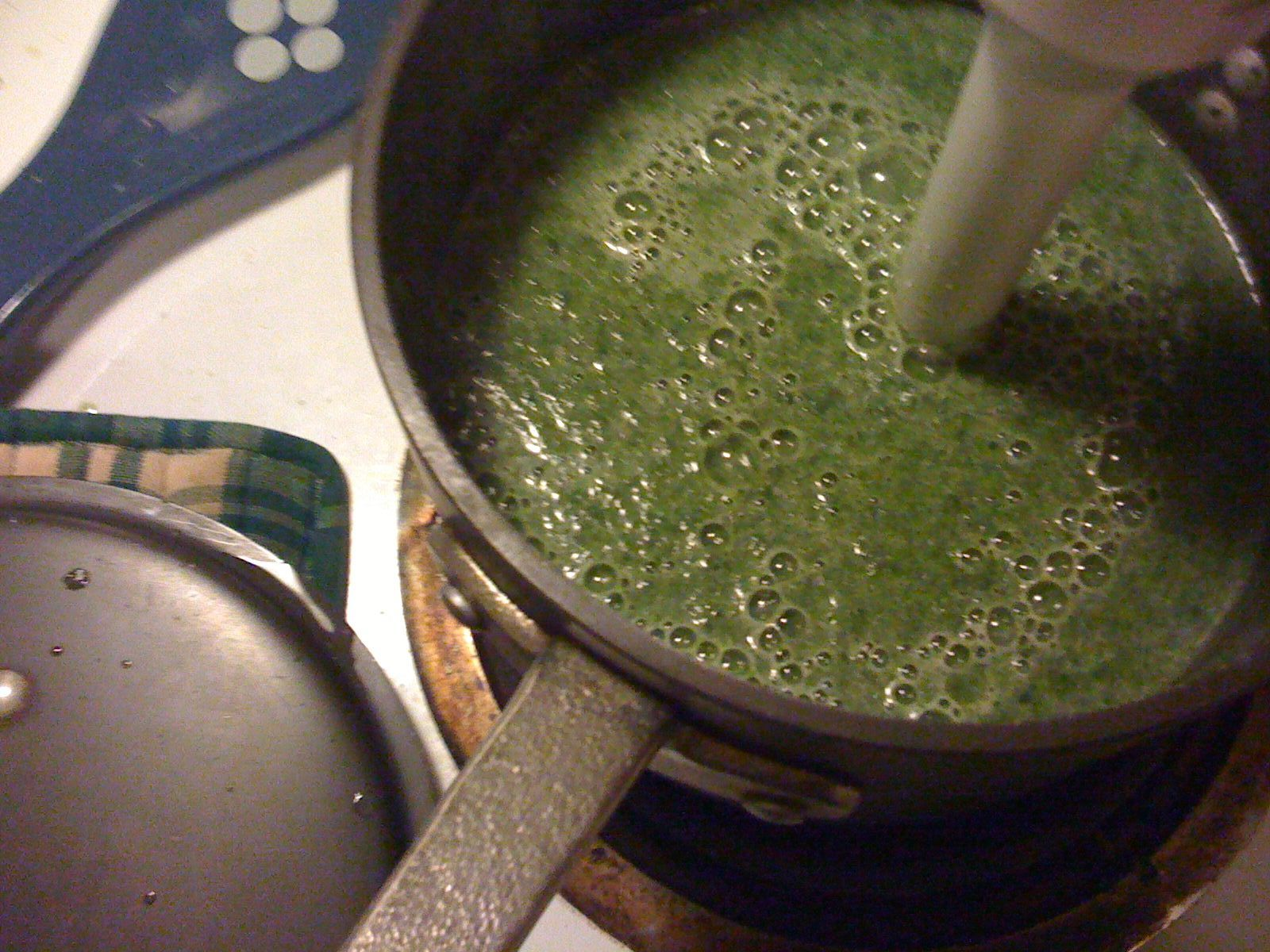
Cream of spinach soup

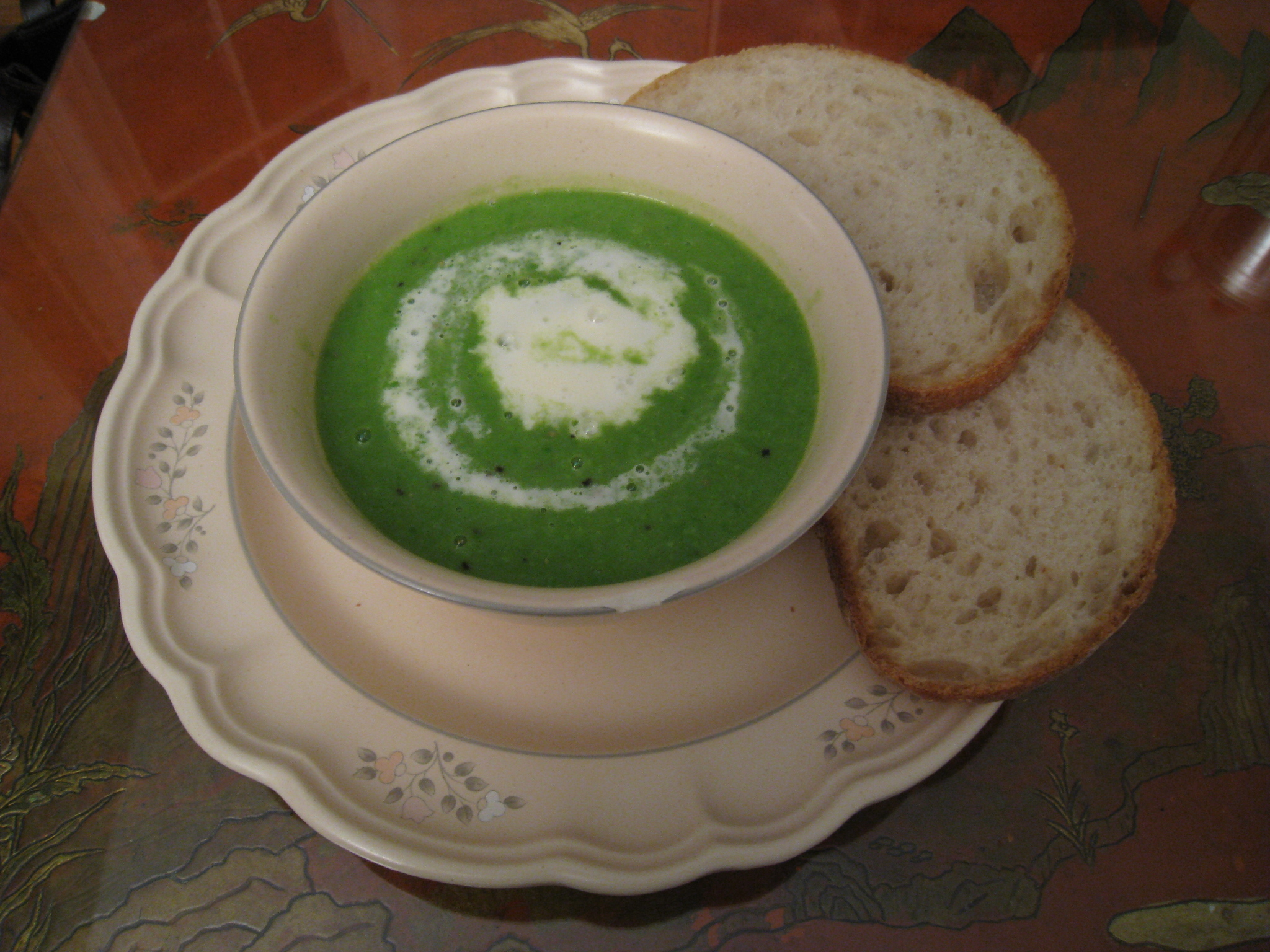
Spring pea soup, an example of a spring soup

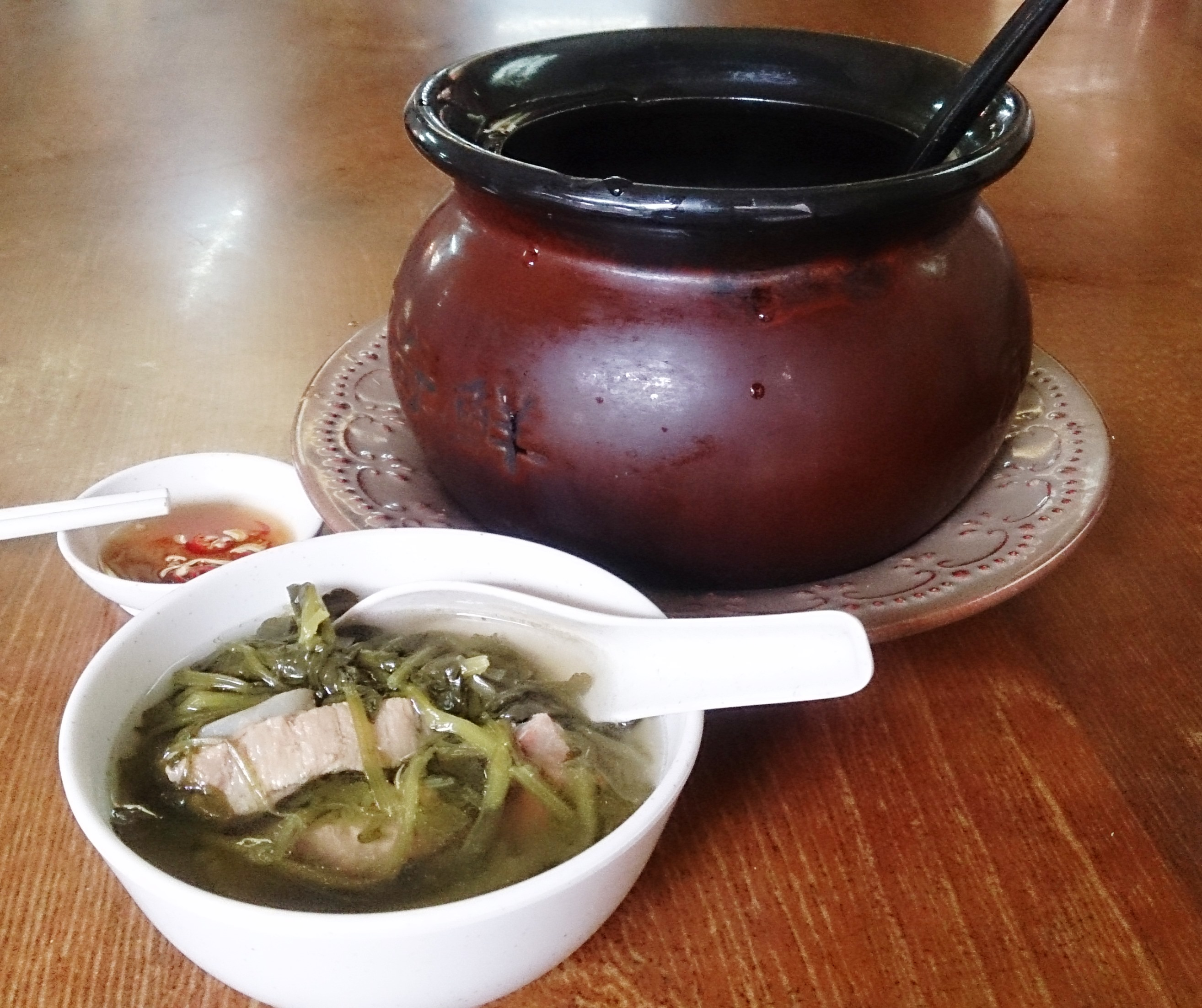
Watercress soup

== See also ==
- List of vegetable dishes
- List of soups
- Tomato soup
