= Spring soup =

Soup made with seasonal ingredients

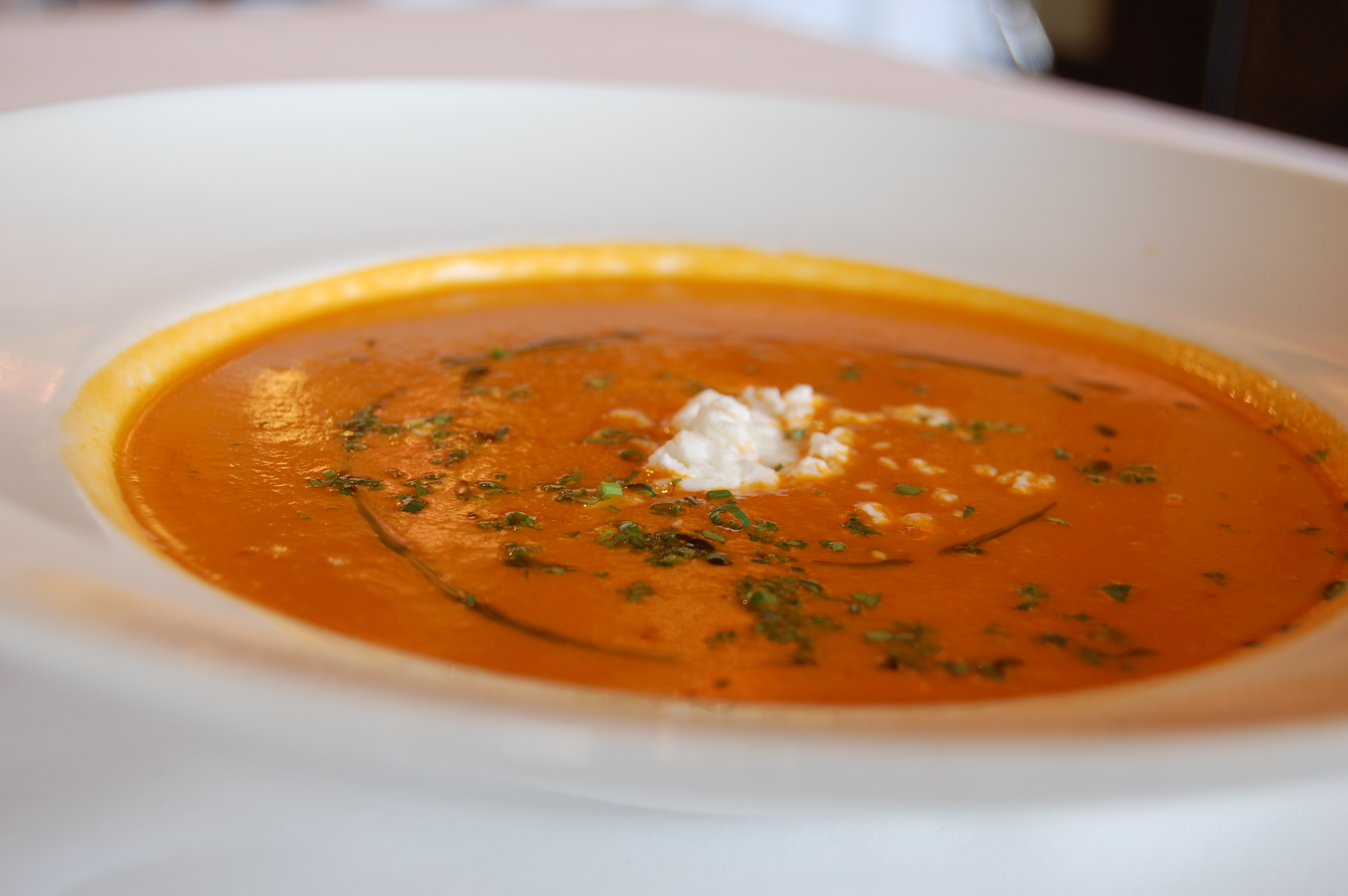
- Spring vegetable soup
- Type: Soup
- Main ingredients: Asparagus or other spring vegetables; broth, chowder, or bisque

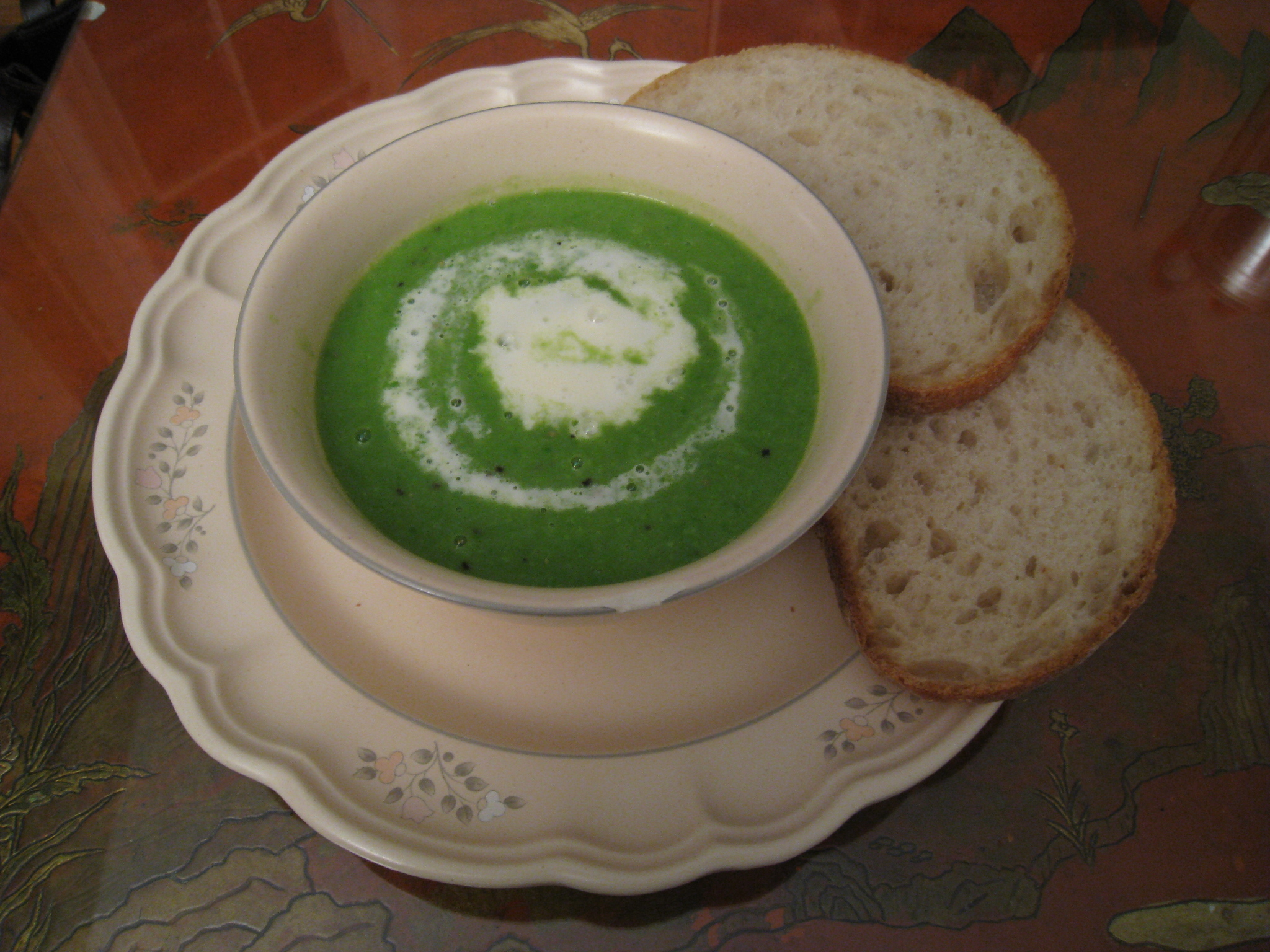
Spring pea soup

Spring soup is a soup made with ingredients that are only in season for a short period during spring. Although asparagus largely characterizes spring soup, spring soup may include just about any spring vegetable added to a broth, chowder, or bisque. Spring soup is popular largely because it includes fresh ingredients not seen for a while by the consumer.

== Characteristics ==
Where winter soups are hearty to "warm and fortify", spring soups aim to celebrate "new skies and freshness" by being "delicate and light, pretty and promising." Spring soups need lighter, brighter tastes and textures than their winter counterparts. A reason for this is that spring soups "capture the essence of the season in a clean-tasting, refreshing broth that showcases the pure flavors" of its ingredients.

Ingredients used in spring soup include a purée of pea, asparagus, rapini, and fennel, with asparagus being considered the quintessential spring vegetable to largely characterize spring soup. Spring soups typically show a subtle green color to reflect spring.

== History ==
In 1828, The British Almanac provided housekeepers' information to add spring soup to a July menu. In 1896, the Holland Society of New York published a spring soup recipe that included amontillado, olives, almonds, chicken, and radishes. In 1898, spring soup was defined as a soup having a stock with any spring vegetables added that have first been parboiled in water, with the soup often colored with caramel.

== See also ==
- List of vegetable soups
