= List of Maltese dishes =

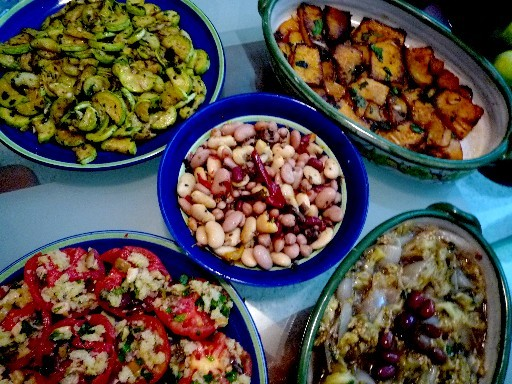
Some Maltese vegetable dishes

The following is a list of dishes in Maltese cuisine:

== Appetizers ==
- Żebbuġ mimli (pitted green olives stuffed with tuna mixture)
- Fażola bajda bit-tewm u t-tursin (white beans with parsley, garlic and olive oil)
- Ful bit-tewm
- Bigilla (mashed "Tic beans "known in Malta as "Ful Ta' Ġirba" (Djerba beans))
- Galletti (Maltese biscuit)
- Bebbux (escargot)
- Arjoli (dip, a Maltese version of aioli without eggs but with added breadcrumbs/crushed galletti, tomato paste and various other pureed ingredients such as olives, capers, onions and anchovies, and herbs such as mint and parsley)

== Soups ==
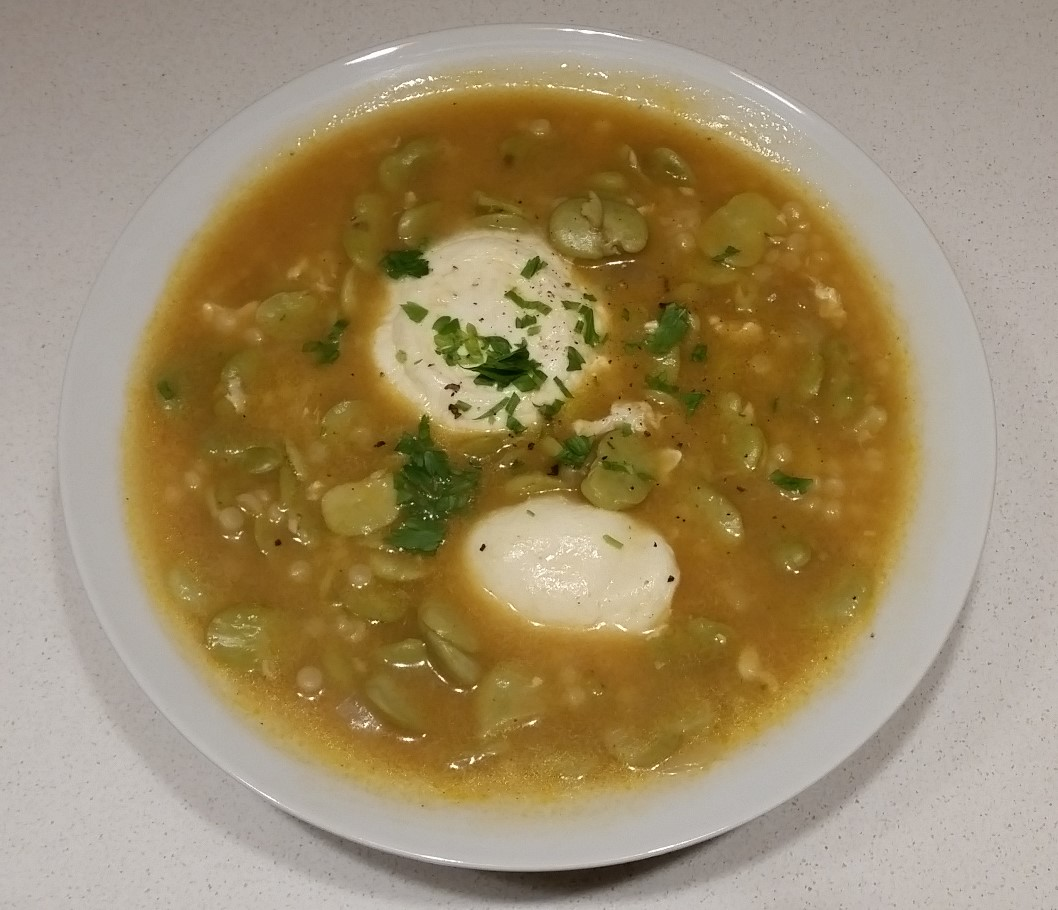
Kusksu is traditionally eaten during Lent.

- Brodu (beef or chicken broth)
- Minestra (Maltese version of minestrone, a thick soup of Italian origin made with vegetables)
- Kusksu (vegetable soup with small pasta beads called kusksu and fresh broad beans in season)
- Soppa tal-armla Widow's Soup (vegetable soup with fresh cheeselets and beaten eggs)
- Aljotta (fish soup with plenty of garlic, herbs, and tomatoes)
- Kawlata (cabbage and pork soup)

== Pasta and rice ==
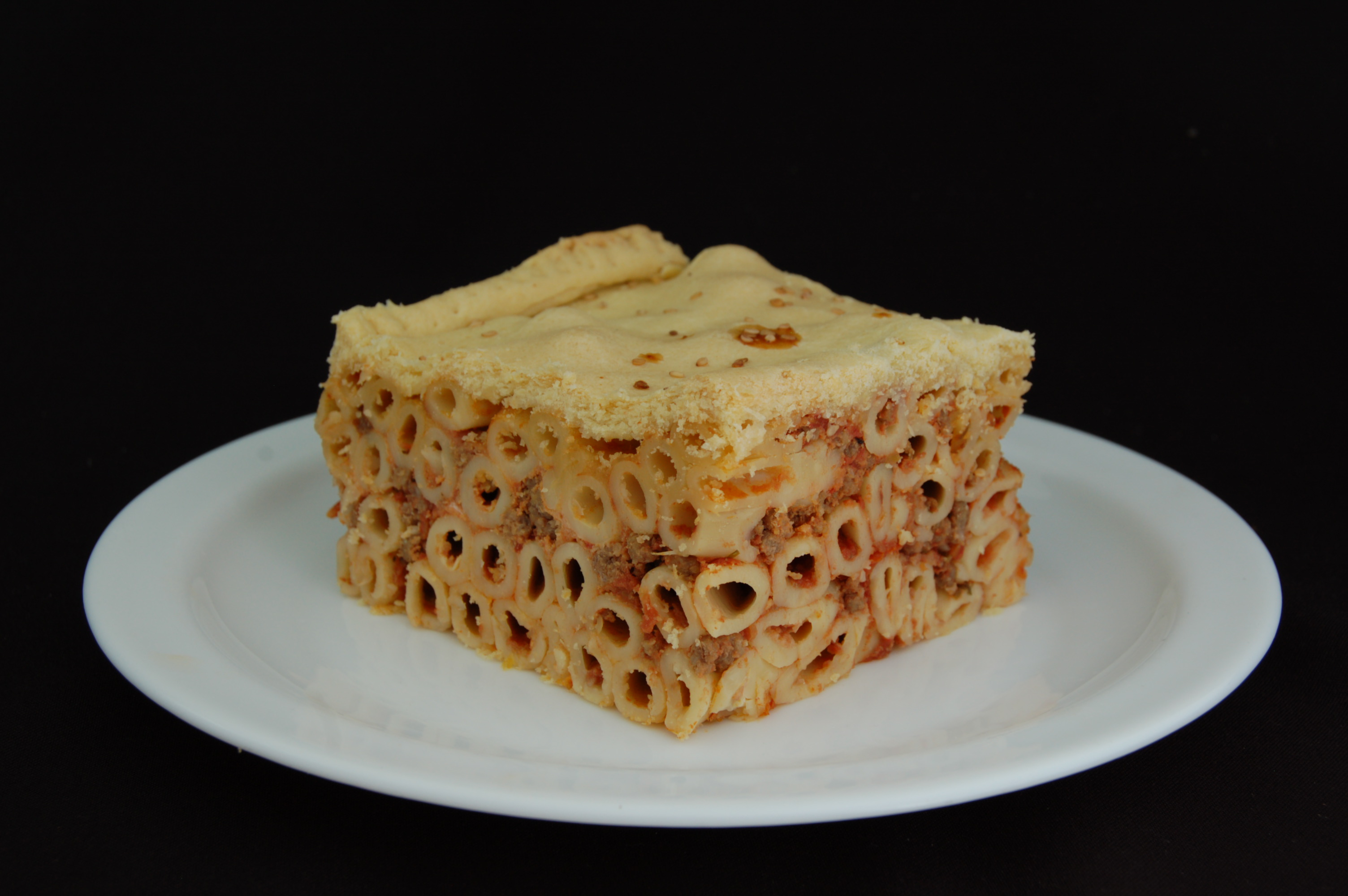
A slice of timpana

- Imqarrun (macaroni, Bolognese-style meat sauce, and egg casserole)
- Timpana (macaroni and tomato sauce casserole)
- Ravjul (ravioli and tomato sauce)
- Ross il-forn (baked rice)
- Għaġin grieg (small pasta beads with minced pork and cheese)
- Froġa tat-tarja (fried omelette with vermicelli pasta)
- Spagetti biz-zalza tal-fenek (spaghetti with rabbit sauce)

== Meat ==
- Stuffat tal-fenek (rabbit stew)
- Fenek moqli (fried rabbit)
- Braġjoli (thin slices of meat that are stuffed and rolled as a roulade)
- Laħam fuq il-fwar (steamed slices of beef)
- Falda Mimlija (stuffed flank of pork)
- Laħam taż-żiemel (stallion meat, usually fried or baked in a white wine sauce)
- Zalzett tal-Malti (a short, thick sausage made of pork, sea salt, black peppercorns, coriander seeds and parsley)
- Mazzit (Maltese blood sausage)

== Fish ==
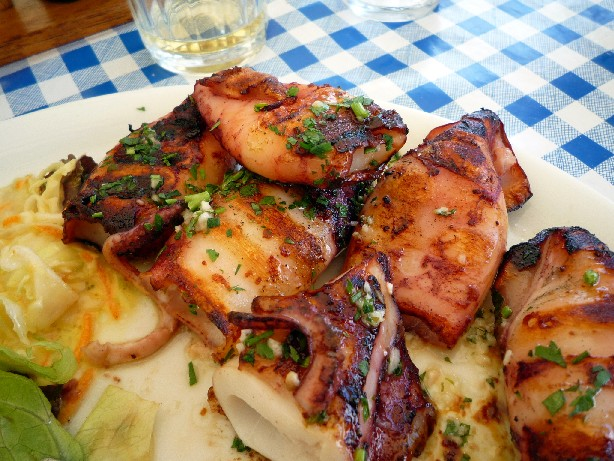
Grilled calamari

- Lampuka
- Stuffat tal-qarnit (octopus stew)
- Qarnit bit-tewm (octopus with garlic)
- Klamari mimlija (stuffed calamari)
- Pixxispad (fried swordfish)

== Eggs and cheeses ==
- Ġbejna (plural ġbejniet), a small round cheese, varieties of which include:
  - Ġbejna friska ("fresh ġbejna") – fresh, soft cheese stored in its natural state, without whey, with a similar taste to mozzarella
  - Ġbejna tal-ilma ("ġbejna in water") – ġbejna preserved in whey
  - Ġbejna maħsula – ġbejna rubbed with salt
  - Ġbejna tal-bżar – ġbejna coated in pepper
  - Ġbejna tal-żejt – dried ġbejna, often with pepper, and preserved in oil, sometimes with wine vinegar
  - Ġbejna moxxa – sun-dried ġbejna
  - Ġbejna t'Għawdex – sun-dried ġbejna from Gozo
  - Ġbejna bajda – white ġbejna
  - Ġbejna mħawra – ġbejna with mixed herbs
  - Ġbejna tal-ħabaq – ġbejna with basil
  - Ġbejna sagħtar u kosbor – ġbejna with thyme and coriander
- Froġa (omelette with ġbejna, broad beans or meat)
- Balbuljata (scrambled eggs cooked with tomatoes and onions)

== Vegetable-based entrees and side dishes ==
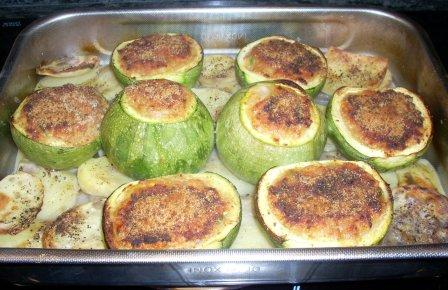
Qargħabagħli mimli (stuffed marrows)

- Qarabagħli mimli (stuffed marrows)
- Qarabagħli mimli (stuffed courgette)
- Brunġiel mimli (stuffed aubergine)
- Bżar mimli (stuffed peppers)
- Patata l-forn (baked sliced potatoes)
- Kapunata
- Qaqoċċ mimli (stuffed artichokes)
- Tadam mimli (cold summer dish, tomatoes stuffed with cold rice salad, mayo, olives, capers)

== Savoury pastries ==
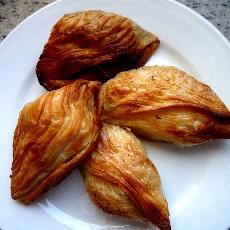
Pastizzi

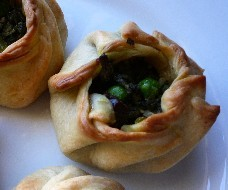
Spinach and Pea Qassata with salted tuna, anchovies and herbs

- Torta tal-irkotta (ricotta pie)
- Sfineġ (vegetable, fish or cheese fritters);
- Pastizzi
- Qassatat (qassata)
- Torti tar-ross u l-qargħa ħamra (rice and pumpkin pie)

== Bread ==
- Ħobża tal-Malti
- Ftira (a Maltese flatbread)
- Ħobż biż-żejt u t-tadam (bread with olive oil and tomato)
- Ftira Għawdxija
- Qagħaq tal-Appostli

== Sweets ==
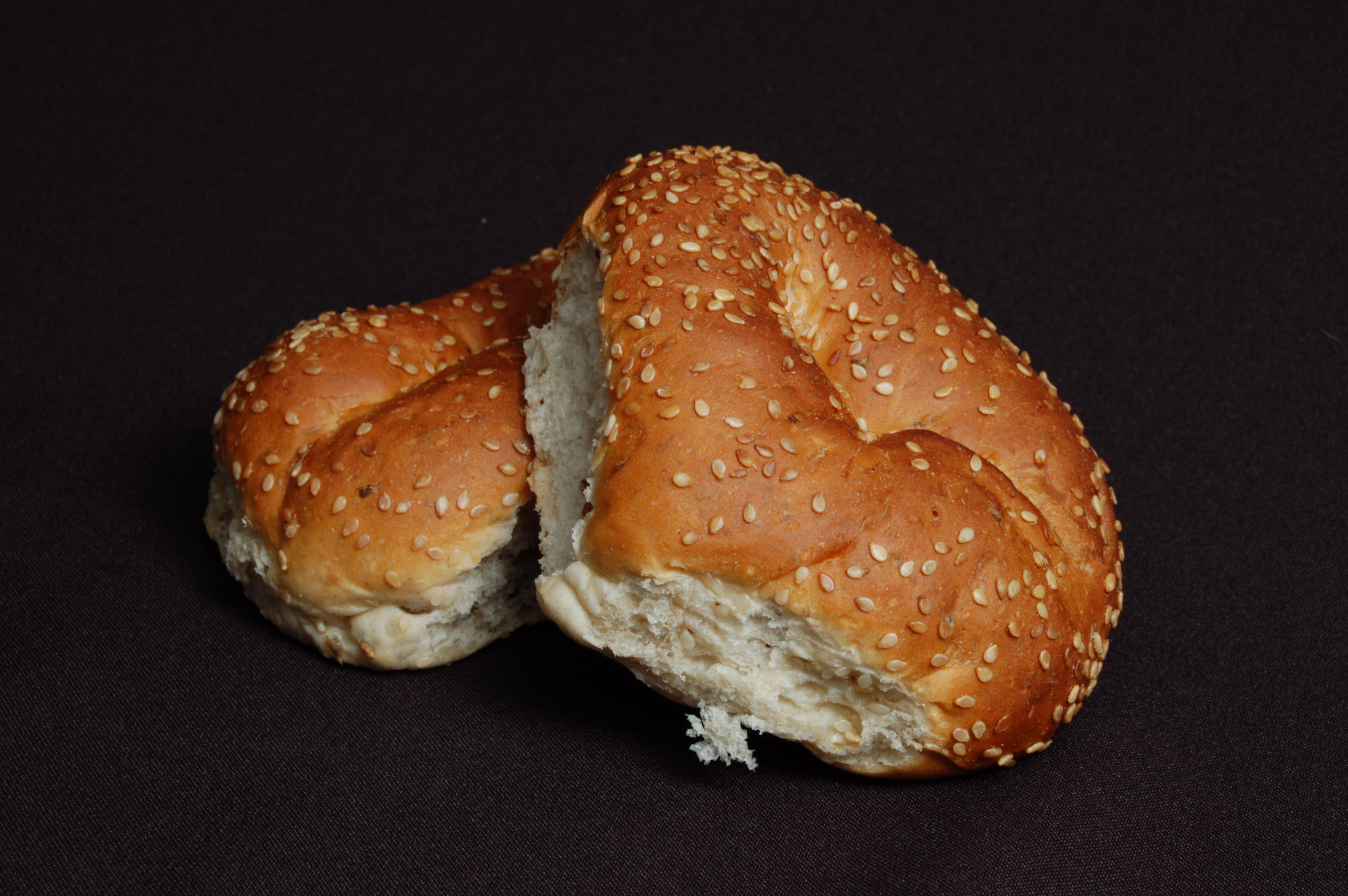
Qagħaq tal-ħmira

- Qagħaq tal-ħmira (or just "Kagħak" in some dialects, soft sweet bagel shape cake with a hint of aniseed, topped with sesame seeds)
- Imqaret (deep fried diamond-shaped pastry)
- Kannoli tal-irkotta (ricotta filled fried crisp pastry tubes)
- Ravjul moqli (sweet toasted ravioli)
- Torta tat-tamal (date and cocoa tart)
- Torta tal-marmorat (almond and chocolate pie)
- Ħelwa tat-Tork (nut studded sesame seed and sugar halva)
- Pudina tal-ħobż (baked bread pudding with raisins and cocoa powder)
- Prinjolata (Carnival sweet, made of biscuit and sponge cake covered with frosting and decorated with glacè cherries and melted chocolate)
- Kwareżimal (Lenten almond biscuit scented with the zest of orange, lemon and Maltese mixed spice, cinnamon and orange blossom)
- Ftira tar-Randan (Lenten honey drizzled squares of crisp deep fried pastry)
- Karamelli tal-ħarrub (Lenten hard candy flavoured with carob)
- Figolla (Easter icing-coated biscuit stuffed with a mixture of sweet ground almonds called intrita)
- Ħobża ta' San Martin (sweet bread roll, sweetened with mastic associated with Saint Martin's Day)
- Qagħaq tal-għasel or tal-Qastanija (Christmas sweet rings made from a light pastry with a filling made of treacle, honey, semolina, citrus zest, cinnamon and cloves)
- Għadam tal-mejtin (Pastry shaped in the form of a bone filled with almond paste)
- Zeppoli
- Qubbajt (Traditional Maltese Nougat)
- Ġelat Malti (Ġelat tan-nanna) a traditional ice cream made from condensed milk, cinnamon, nuts, and candied peel.

== Beverages ==
- Ġulepp tal-ħarrub (carob syrup)
- Imbuljuta (chestnut, tangerine zest and cocoa drink)
- Kafè (coffee boiled with aniseed, cinnamon sticks and/or rosewater, alternatively with cloves in some communities)
- Kafè bl-aniżetta (coffee with anisette liqueur)
- Ruġġata (a drink made from cinnamon, vanilla, bitter almonds, sugar, water and milk; similar to Italian 'orzata')
- Te fit-tazza (a local variety of builder's tea, traditionally served with condensed milk and sweetened in a glass)
- Kinnie (a bittersweet soft drink)
- Liqueur tal-bajtar (a prickly pear-based liqueur)
