= Lent in Malta =

Paschal celebrations in Malta

Easter is one of the most significant events in the religious and social calendar, celebrated heavily in the European country of Malta.

It's a time for families to get together and commemorate Holy Week with traditional food, re-enactments and performances, and religious processions. Those who participate in ceremonial occasions and re-enactments do so with great enthusiasm and consider it the most hallowed event in the Roman Catholic Calendar.

Numerous religious traditions, most of them inherited from one generation to the next, are part of the Paschal celebrations in the Maltese Islands.

== Lent ==
Ash Wednesday, which is pronounced as (Ras ir-Randan) is the first day of the penitential period for Holy Week, is commemorated with a Mass, when the Priest would mark the sign of the cross in ash on the forehead of worshippers, translating to grief and mourning for one's sins.

Following the completion of the Mass, a statue of Christ would then be carried out of the churches and villages across Malta and Gozo's islands.

During the Lenten period, the churches' exterior and interiors would be draped in purple or black linen, With all the faces of the statues and paintings will be covered from observance for the penitential season.

Preparations for the solemn Easter festivities commence 40 days before Easter Sunday (L-Għid il-Kbir), following the end of the Carnival celebrations. The older generation will recall that not so many years ago fasting (sawm) on a daily basis was obligatory. Rules in this respect have now been relaxed considerably, and obligatory fasting is now limited to Ash Wednesday and Good Friday. There are also people that do not eat meat and sweets, every Wednesday and Friday throughout these 40 days. Holy week starts during the last week of lent with Palm Sunday, commemorated a week before Easter Sunday.

Lenten sermons (eżerċizzji spiritwali), meant to bring about reconciliation between man and his Creator, are held in all parishes in Malta and Gozo over a number of days, generally in the evenings. The traditional Way of the Cross is another very popular devotion during this period, with the faithful meditating at the fourteen Stations of the Cross (Via Sagra) relating various episodes of the Passion and Crucifixion of Our Lord.

A number of penitential pilgrimages are also held, and statues depicting scenes from the Passion are venerated in several churches. Some churches also dress in black damask.

== Our Lady of Sorrows Day ==
Before the festivities during the Holy week, typically on the Friday before Good Friday, it is the Feast of Our Lady of Sorrows Day (Jum id-Duluri). The main procession takes place in Valletta, the capital of Malta, but many other smaller villages also have their own. Participants would amble behind the Lady of Sorrows, reciting prayers; some worshippers would also walk in heavy chains barefoot as a sign of respect.

The feast of Our Lady of Sorrows (Jum id-Duluri) is a very significant occasion for thousands of devotees In Malta. This feast is traditionally celebrated on the Friday before Good Friday, with the faithful walking in the procession behind Penitents in practically every town and village. Traditionally, some of the penitents walk barefoot or drag heavy chains tied to their feet, as a sign of repent whilst also wearing a sizeable pointed capirote, usually in a wide array of colours covering their identity from others, fulfilling a vow for favours received through divine intercession. The most popular Our Lady of Sorrows procession is held in the church of Our Lady of Jesus in Valletta.

== Holy Week ==
=== Palm Sunday ===
Holy Week commences on Palm Sunday, a week before Easter Sunday. Palm leaves blessed with holy water by the priest are tied into the shape of the cross and are distributed to each household in Malta along with olive leaf branches. Traditionally after Mass, there is a prodigious parade where parishioners would carry a giant statue of Christ to signify his entrance into Jerusalem when palm branches were placed before him in his path.

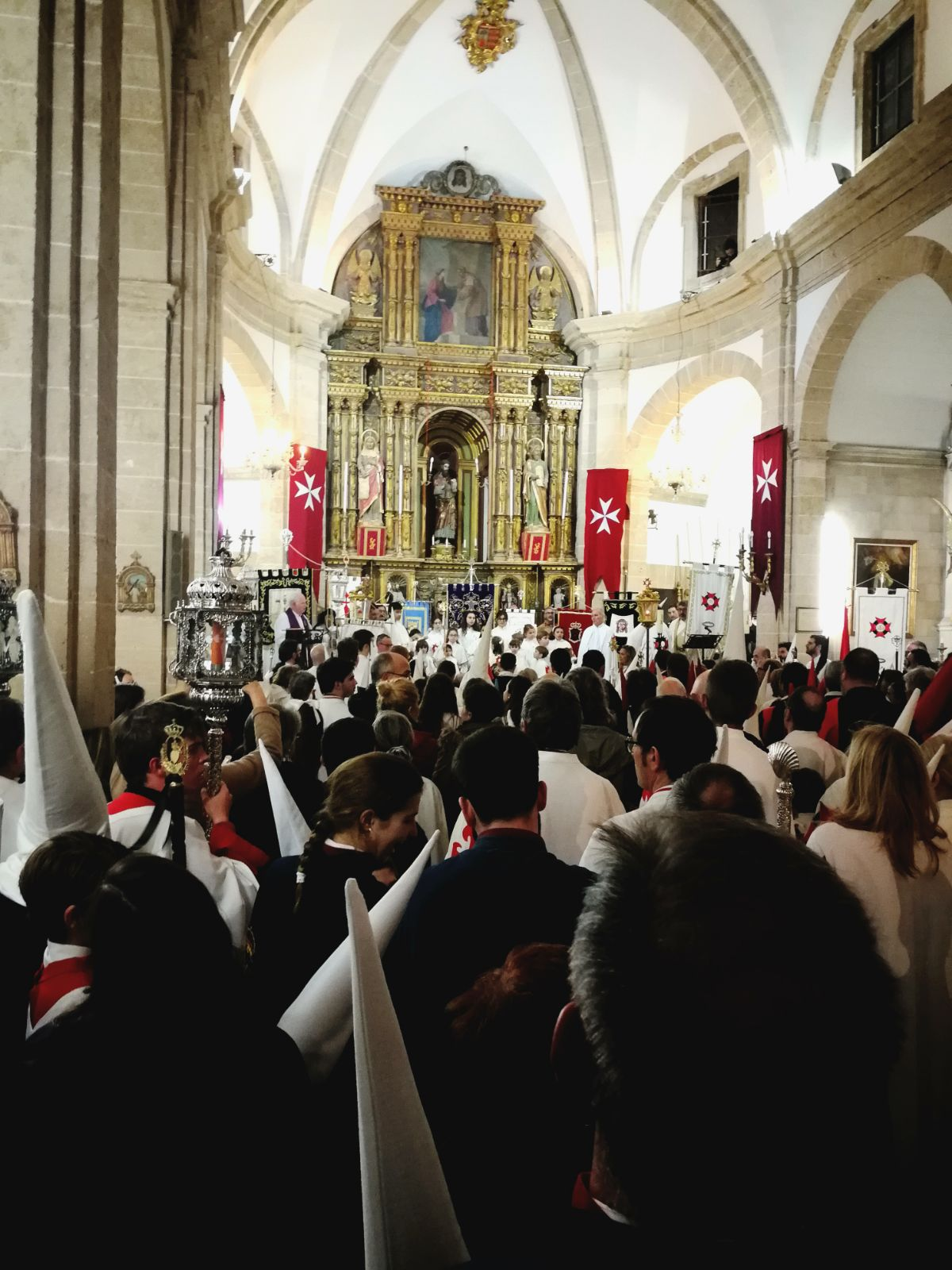
Capirote

=== Maundy Thursday ===
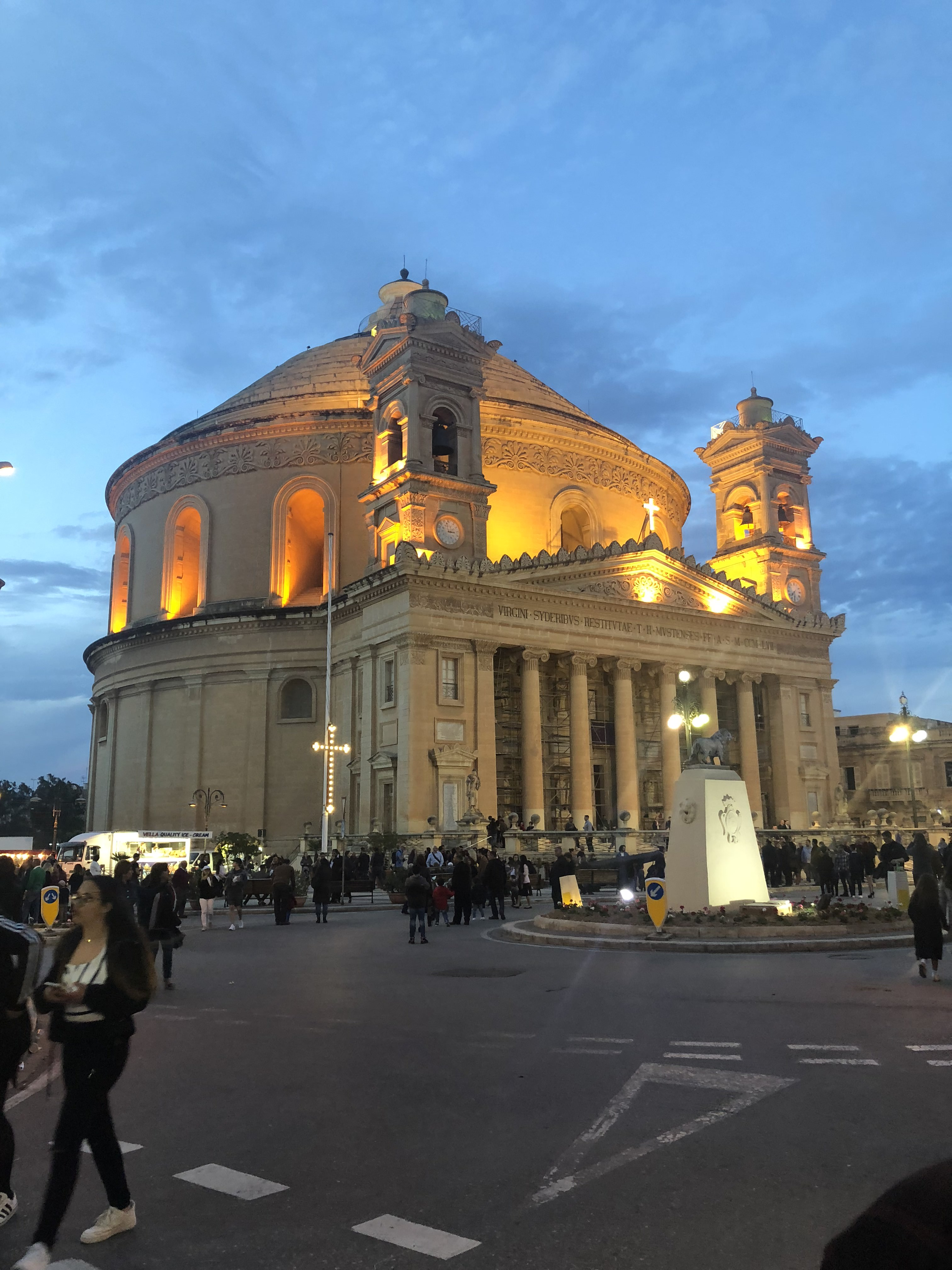
Mosta Dome during Maundy Thursday

Maundy Thursday, the eve of Good Friday, is a solemn occasion where there are Last Supper re-enactments and displays in multiple locations around Malta, with the most significant one that taking place at Ta' Passi fields during the night before. Then after the Mass, there is a tradition called the "Seven visits", where Maltese families would gather after Mass and traditionally visit seven churches throughout the night carrying candles and laying those candles in all seven churches; after that, everyone will go home in pitch-black darkness without the guidance of the candles.

=== Good Friday ===
Good Friday is a day that comes with great sadness in Malta and Gozo

This is the saddest point. During Holy Week, There are no sounds of church bells to be heard, and the mood is very melancholy. Across the island, some masses take place in the afternoon, which are only done outside; you cannot enter any churches at all on this day. Many people wear black clothes to represent their sadness, and other people dress up as period corrected clothing worn during that time.

Local bands play funeral marches. Grand Statues are taken out of the Churches, each one depicting a specific stage in the stations of the cross; these States are over 6 feet tall and are highly decorated in gold; those who take part in the processions and carrying the statues will vary from the very young to the very old and each one who has it will hold it as a badge of honour these statues are large and heavy in nature. Some figures require up to ten people to hoist them. Behind the statues, you would see more people dressed up as Roman soldiers carrying swords and nets whilst some soldiers are cracking whips in front of the statue in a respectable manner.

It is said that the first procession in Malta was in Rabat and the first one in Gozo was in Victoria (Rabat). Not all of these processions have the same number of statues, the traditional number of statues is 8 but as years went on more statues were introduced. The 8 traditional statues show: Christ in the Garden of Gethsemane, The Flagellation (Recent statues of this episode also include one or two Roman soldiers), Jesus Crowned with thorns otherwise known as the 'Ecce Homo' (Recent statues of this episode include the figure of Pontius Pilate), Jesus Falls Under the Cross (Recent statues include the figure of a Roman soldier), The Veronica (some even contain the women of Jerusalem), 'Il-Vara l-Kbira' (The Crucifixion), The Burial of Christ (2 localities don't have the usual Christ in the urn figure but have the Deposition episode) and our Lady of Sorrows. As mentioned earlier, nowadays there are processions with statues like: The Last Supper (found in Qormi and Żebbuġ, Gozo), Peter's Denial (found only in Nadur, Gozo), Jesus meets his Mother (found in Qormi, Paola and Xagħra), Simon the Cyrene helps Jesus with the Cross (Found in Żejtun, Ħaż-Żebbuġ and Qormi) The tenth Station (Or Jesus is Undressed to be Crucified, which can only be found in Rabat), Jesus is lowered from the cross (found only in Qala) and The Dead body of Jesus is given to his Mother Mary (Otherwise known as Il-Pietà which can be found in Żejtun and Qormi).

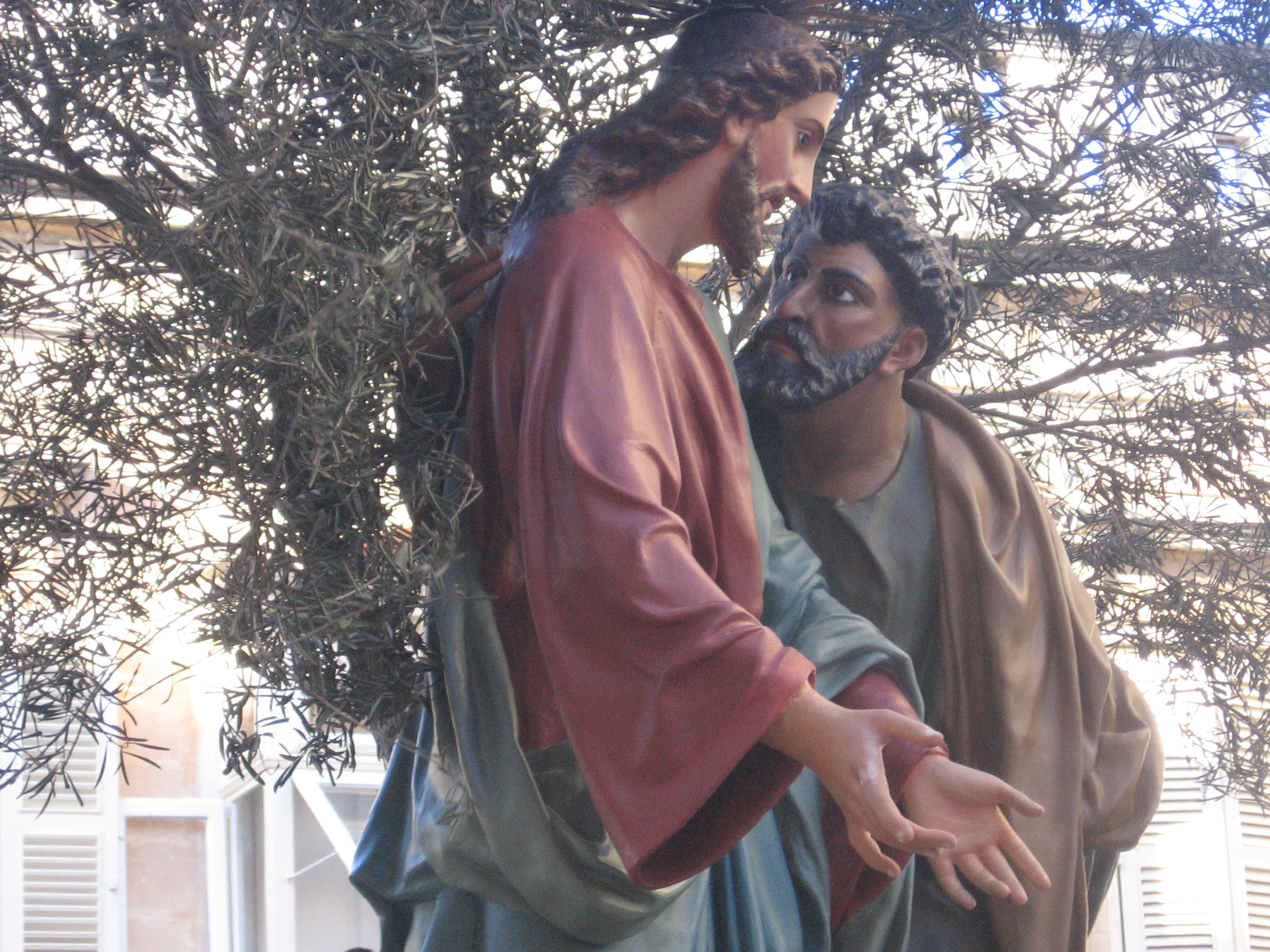
Judas, detail from statue used during Good Friday processions in Qormi, Malta.

The Good Friday ritual in Malta includes visits to seven tabernacles, or "Altars of Repose", in seven different churches. Sombre and solemn religious processions and pageants are held in many villages, with statues and costumed, local, amateur actors representing scenes from the Passion of Christ. In some parts of Malta, these processions will include a number of penitents dressed in white robes and hoods, walking barefoot (sometimes with chains tied to their ankles) as an act of penance or in fulfilment of a vow. This is a unique, medieval tradition which still survives today.

=== Easter Sunday ===
Easter Sunday in Malta, by contrast, is marked by the incessant pealing of church bells, and festive, fast-paced processions, with the youth of each town running through the streets bearing sculptures of the Risen Christ.

== Easter Sunday ==
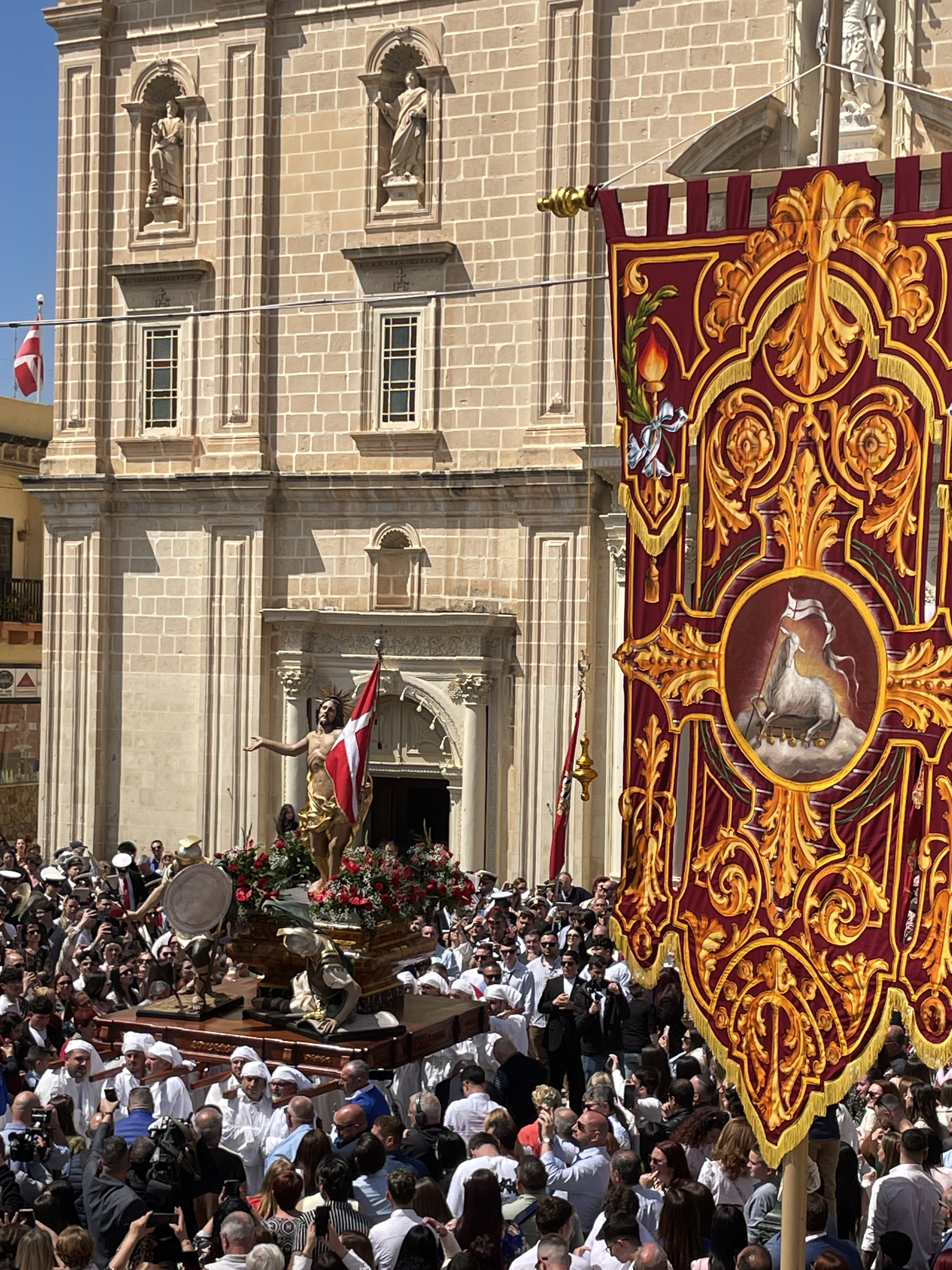
Statue of the Risen Christ in Qormi, Malta on Easter Sunday.

The scene changes dramatically on Easter morning, with the triumphal Resurrection of the Lord being traditionally celebrated with a morning procession with the statue of the Risen Christ (L-Irxoxt) which is carried shoulder high by parishioners. The statue bearers run with the statue through the main streets of the village to the applause of the crowds. Throughout the procession people throw paper confetti from windows and balconies, adding to the joyous atmosphere of the day. In contrast to the sombre and solemn Good Friday processions, on Easter Sunday, brass bands play joyous tunes all along the procession. Children too enjoy, thanks to gifts of Easter Eggs (Bajd tal-Għid) and traditional 'figolla', usually a pastry figure of a lamb or fish which are carried with them and hold out to be blessed by the Risen Christ as the statue makes its way past them. Whilst a good number of localities hold these processions, the most popular with locals are those held in the Three Cities: Birgu, Senglea and most notablely Cospicua.

== Traditional food eaten throughout the period ==
It is a tradition that a loaf of bread be eaten after the Seven Visits on Maundy Thursday. It is a ring-shaped loaf of bread made with honey and garnished with almonds and sesame seeds qagħaq tal-Appostli (Apostles' Rings), which are circular loaves of unleavened bread studded with roasted almonds and sprinkled with sesame seeds, and honey cakes known as kwareżimal (the name referring to the quadragesima, or 40 days of Lent). On Easter Sunday, children are rewarded for their abstinence from sweets throughout Lent by means of a figolla. The figolla is the most sought after Easter food. They are baked in Easter and given to friends and family, especially children, on Easter Sunday. The figolla is a sweet almond Easter cake covered in icing or chocolate and formed in a festive shape, such as a rabbit, fish, chick, duck or the dgħajsa (traditional Maltese boat).

== Salt Paintings ==
During Holy Week, members of the community create artworks with either coloured salt or coloured rice. The lifespan of these salt and rice artworks is very short. Being made from perishable items, they will have to be thrown away after Holy Week is over. This painstaking art form was started during the 1960s, and it has been an ongoing occurrence during every Holy Week in Malta.

=== Traditional food of Lent and Good Friday ===
- Kwareżimal (Lent cake)
- Karamelli (Carob sweets)
- Pastizzi tal-Inċova (Anchovy cakes)
- Torta tal-Ħaxu (Riccota pie)
- Qagħqa tal-Appostli (Apostles ring bread)
- Qaqoċċ (Artichoke)
- Bebbux (Snails)
- Qassatat tal-ħelu (sweet biscuits)

=== Traditional food of Easter Sunday ===
- Figolla
- Bajd tal-Għid (Easter Eggs)
- Ħaruf (Lamb)

== See also ==
- Easter Sunday Processions in Malta and Gozo
- Zejtun Devotion to Our Lady of Sorrows
