= Ftira =

Maltese bread

Maltese ftira
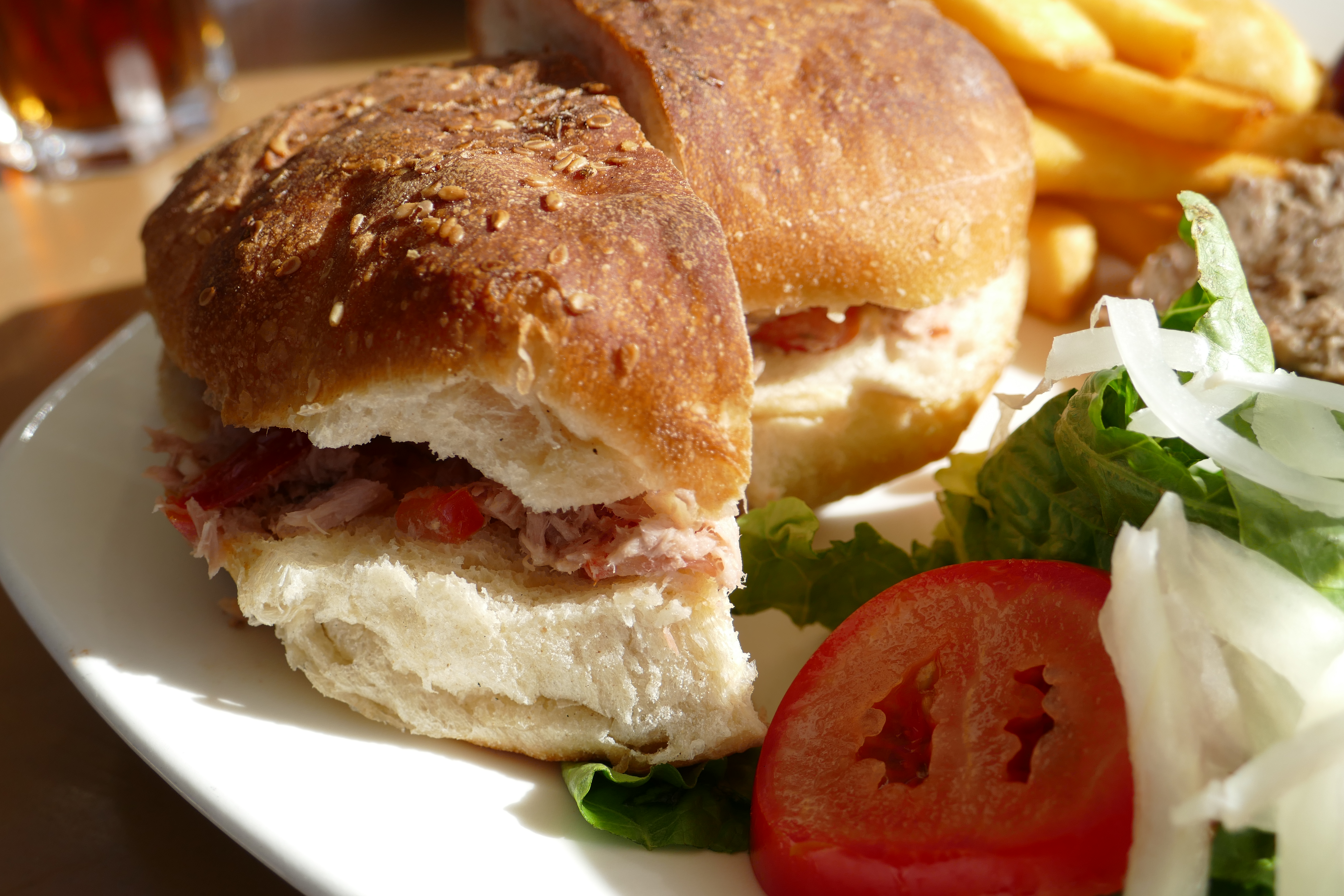
- Type: Bread
- Place of origin: Malta
- Variations: Gozitan open ftira

Ftira (plural: ftajjar) is a ring-shaped, leavened, Maltese bread, usually eaten with fillings such as sardines, tuna, potato, fresh tomato, onion, capers and olives. Regional variations include Gozo ftira, which is served more like a pizza than a sandwich. Gozitan ftira is served open with thinly sliced potato over the crust, or folded over like a calzone.

== Intangible cultural heritage ==
Following the Maltese Parliament's unanimous approval to ratify UNESCO's Convention for the Safeguarding of the Intangible Cultural Heritage, in 2018 Malta's Culture Directorate launched a petition to include the Maltese Ftira as part of UNESCO's Intangible Cultural Heritage (ICH) list. According to a local expert, 'The Making of the Ftira Maltija' dates back to the sixteenth century. Following a strong public call, the Government of Malta announced that it would be submitting the culinary art and culture of the Maltese ftira to UNESCO for consideration as intangible cultural heritage. In 2020, "Il-Ftira, culinary art and culture of flattened sourdough bread in Malta" was added to UNESCO's Intangible Cultural Heritage List.

== See also ==
- Maltese cuisine
- List of Maltese dishes
