= Pastizz =

Savoury pastry from Malta

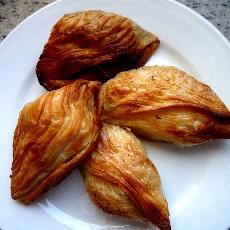
- Two varieties of Maltese pastizzi
- Type: Savoury pastry
- Place of origin: Malta
- Main ingredients: Filo-like pastry, ricotta or mushy peas

A pastizz (pl.: pastizzi) is a traditional savoury pastry from Malta. Pastizzi usually have a filling either of ricotta (pastizzi tal-irkotta or pastizzi tal-ħaxu in Maltese) or curried peas (pastizzi tal-piżelli in Maltese). Pastizzi are a popular and well-known traditional Maltese food. It should not be confused with the Italian pastizz, better known as u' pastizz 'rtunnar.

== Preparation ==
Pastizzi are usually diamond-shaped or round (known as pastizzi tax-xema' in Maltese) and made with a pastry very much like the Greek filo pastry (although there is also a puff pastry version). The pastry is folded in different ways according to the filling, as a means of identification. Traditionally, ricotta pastizzi are folded down the middle, whereas pea pastizzi are folded down the side. In recent years, alternative pastizzi fillings have emerged, most notably chicken pastizzi, which can now be found in virtually all Maltese pastizzeriji alongside the two traditional flavours. Other short-lived or limited edition pastizzi fillings have included ricotta and truffle, Maltese sausage, and Nutella.

Pastizzi are typically baked on metal trays in electric or gas ovens in a pastizzerija, usually a small or family concern. They are also sold in bars, cafes and by street vendors. They are a popular breakfast in outer villages.

== Culinary export ==
Pastizzi are also produced by Maltese immigrant communities in Australia, Canada, the UK, the US and most recently Rome. The first pastizzeria in Scotland opened in 2007.

== In the Maltese language ==
Such is its popularity, the word pastizz has multiple meanings in Maltese. It is used as a euphemism for the vagina, due to its shape, and for describing someone as a "pushover". The Maltese idiom jinbiegħu bħall-pastizzi (selling like pastizzi) is equivalent to the English "selling like hot cakes", to describe a product which seems to have inexhaustible demand. Things which are jinħarġu bħall-pastizzi (coming out like pastizzi) can be said to be emerging at a fast rate, sometimes too quickly.

== See also ==
- Maltese cuisine
- Is-Serkin
