= Maypole (bakery chain) =

Maltese bakery and convenience retail chain

- Company type: Private
- Industry: Food manufacturing; retail
- Founded: 1900 (brand origin)
- Founder: Carmelo (Carmel) Saliba; Luke Gauci
- Headquarters: Qormi (Ħal Qormi), Malta
- Number of locations: 30+ outlets (2025)
- Area served: Malta and Gozo
- Key people: Debono family (owners/directors)
- Products: Bread, baked goods, pastries, cakes; grocery and convenience items
- Website: www.maypole.com.mt

Maypole is a Maltese bakery group and convenience-retail chain headquartered in Qormi. The brand traces its origins to 1900 and has grown from a single bakery to a nationwide network of outlets selling bread, baked goods and grocery items. In August 2025, business media reported the opening of the company's 30th outlet in Valletta.

== History ==
According to contemporary accounts, the Maypole brand dates to 1900. In 1969, baker Carmel “Nenu” Debono bought the Maypole brand from Carmelo Saliba of Pietà; the Debono family subsequently expanded the operation from sites in Gżira and Qormi. In 2010 the company announced investment in a new bakery at the Tal-Ħandaq industrial estate together with new retail outlets, and in May–June 2012 the new 3,000 m^{2} Qormi facility was inaugurated by the Prime Minister.

== Operations ==
Maypole operates an industrial bakery and distribution hub at Tal-Ħandaq, Qormi, producing bread, traditional Maltese baked goods and confectionery for its stores and other clients. The listed head office is The Bakery, Tal-Ħandaq Road, Qormi.

== Outlets ==
As of August 2025 the group reported 30 outlets upon opening the Valletta store on St Lucia Street, with the company site listing branches across Malta and Gozo.

== Community and recognition ==
On 2 November 2021, President George Vella visited the company's operations and commended its environmental awareness and social initiatives.

== Reception and issues ==
In July 2025 a villa owner filed a judicial protest alleging noise nuisance from chillers and freezers at a Maypole outlet; the matter was reported by local media.

== See also ==
- Cuisine of Malta
- List of bakeries
