= Kusksu =

Maltese bean soup

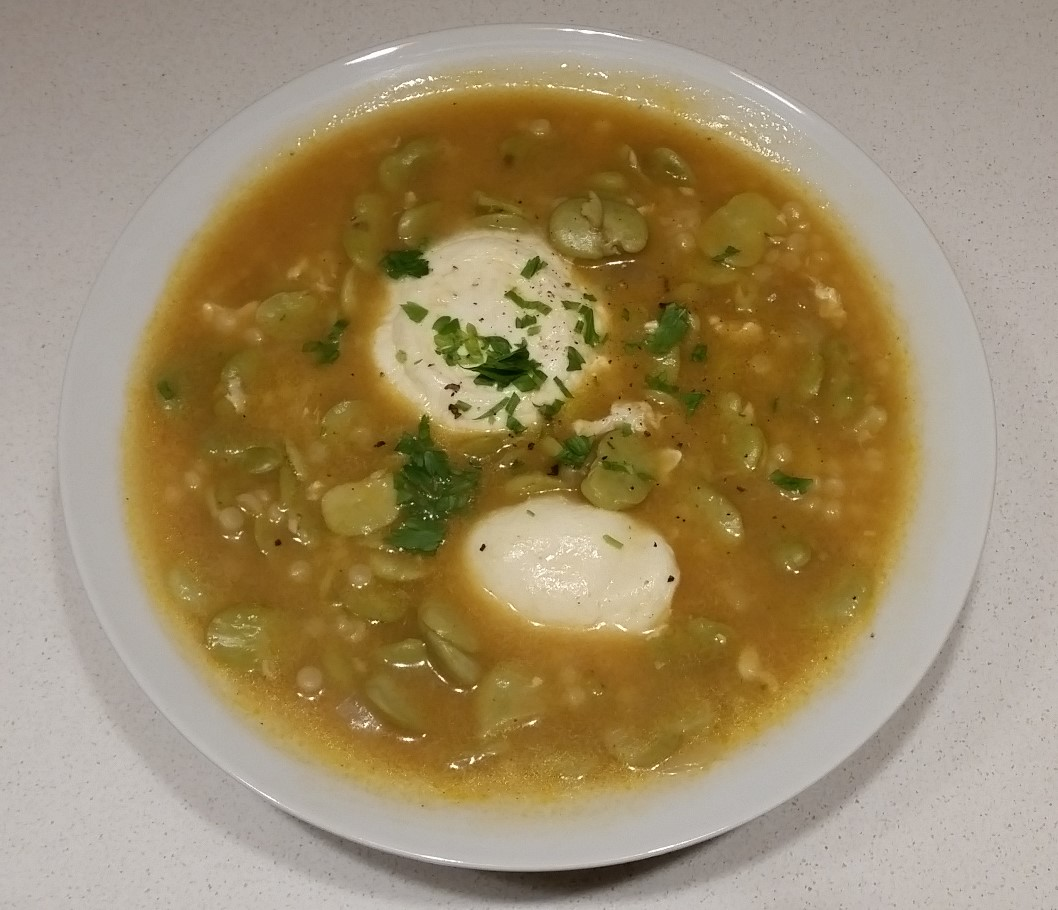
- A typical serving of kusksu
- Alternative names: Kusksu bil-ful
- Type: Soup
- Place of origin: Malta
- Main ingredients: Kusksu, broad beans, ġbejniet

Kusksu (Maltese pronunciation: [ˈkus.ksu]) is a traditional Maltese soup made primarily from seasonal broad beans, small pasta beads, and fresh ġbejniet. Although similar in shape, the small pasta beads, known locally as kusksu, look like couscous, but this one tends to be lighter and fluffier in texture. In contrast, kusksu, which gives the soup its name, is "miniature pasta" which is thick and ideal for simmering. Once cooked, the short-cut pasta beads give the soup a creamy and warm texture.

== Origin ==
Given its close resemblance to couscous, it is likely that kusksu originated during Malta's Arab occupation. However, documentary evidence relating to this period is scarce. A reliable source dating back to the 18th century makes reference to peppercorn-shaped pasta, suggesting that kusksu pasta was a staple in the Maltese diet.

== Ingredients ==
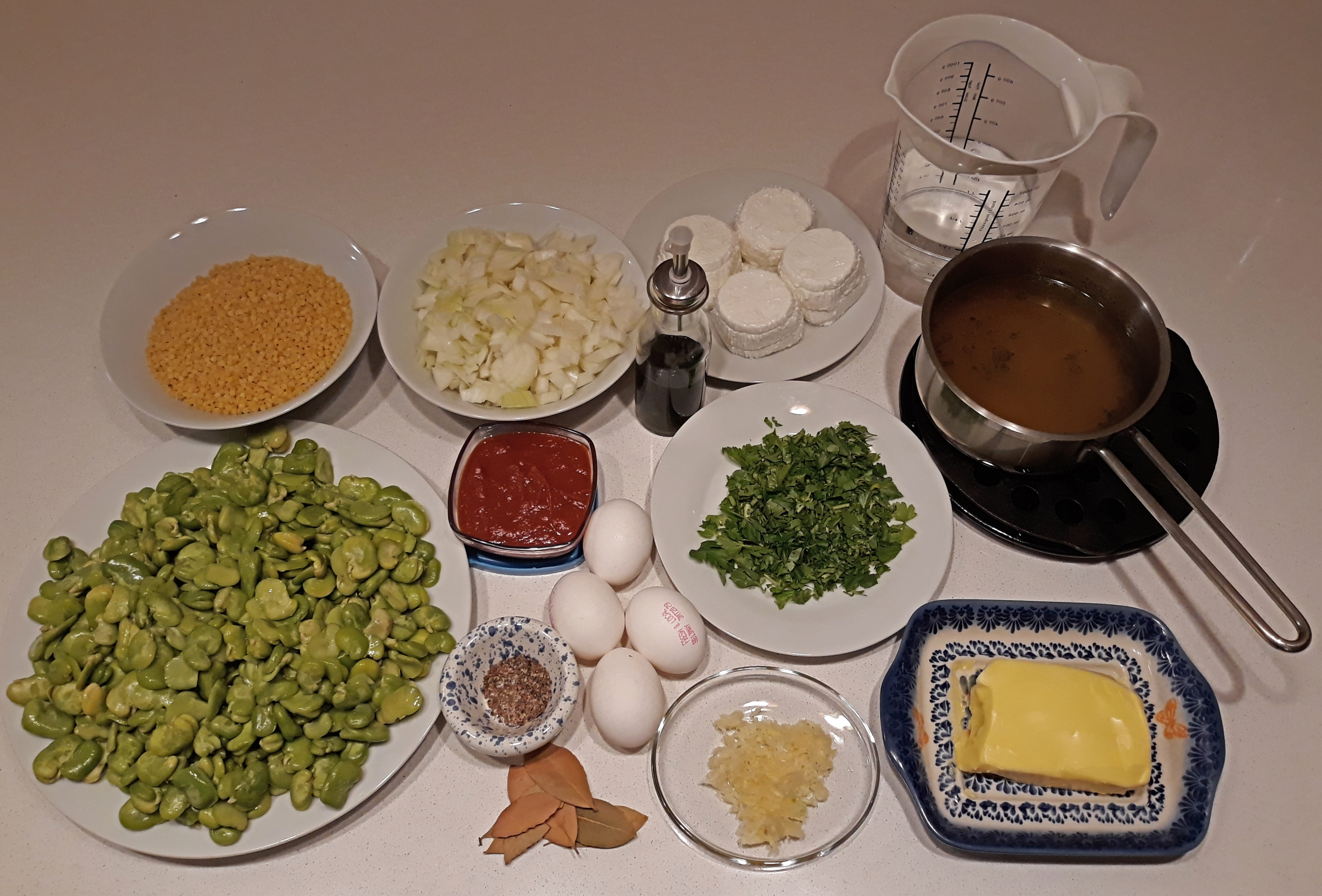
The main ingredients used for kusksu

The primary ingredient used in kusksu is the broad bean, known locally as ful. Broad beans are well-adapted to the Maltese climate and can become invasive if left uncontrolled. In Malta, broad beans are typically sown in December and harvested during early spring. Their cultivation requires little or no care, and most Maltese farmers do not irrigate their crop. In 2016, Malta's National Statistics Office reported that 595 tonnes of broad beans were sold through official markets, a figure that puts into perspective why some locals refer to the broad bean as Malta's "iconic", or "favourite" bean.

The small pasta beads, known as kusksu, are another key ingredient. Apart from giving the soup its name, the pasta, which is "a little bigger than a coriander", adds "a fabulous texture that is like no other". The kusksu pasta, which is "not to be confused with couscous", is widely available in Malta, however, this key ingredient may be hard to source in international markets. While alternatives do exist, these may not always yield the best results.

Other ingredients that are typically found in kusksu include the fresh Maltese ġbejna, usually added just before serving; generous amounts of onions and garlic fried in olive oil or butter; bay leaves; tomato paste; eggs which are typically poached in the soup itself, rather than boiled separately; water or vegetable stock; salt and pepper for seasoning, and parsley for garnishing.

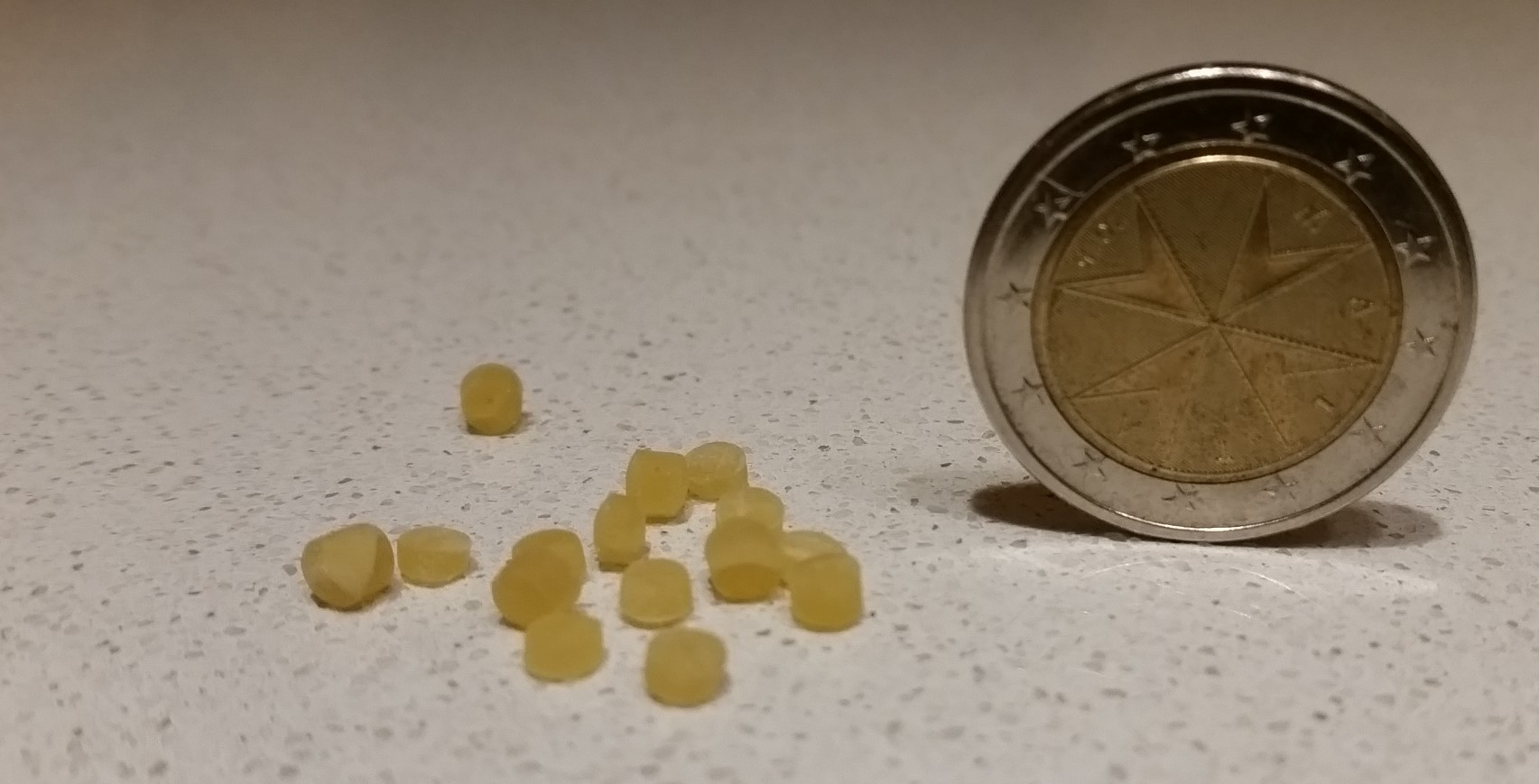
Kusksu pasta beads and a €2 coin

== Variations ==
Multiple versions of this popular Maltese dish exist. Some have included fish, while others have introduced bacon, cabbage, and pumpkin to their kusksu recipe. However, the more "authentic", or perhaps "original" versions of the dish, kusksu bil-ful (kusksu with broad beans), tend to feature fewer and simpler ingredients that are in season. In 2002, MaltaPost issued a series of stamps to celebrate Maltese cuisine and the more traditional version of the dish, kusksu bil-ful, was included.

== See also ==
- List of Maltese dishes
- List of soups
- Berkoukes
