= Is-Serkin =

Bar in Rabat, Malta

Restaurant information
- Location: Malta

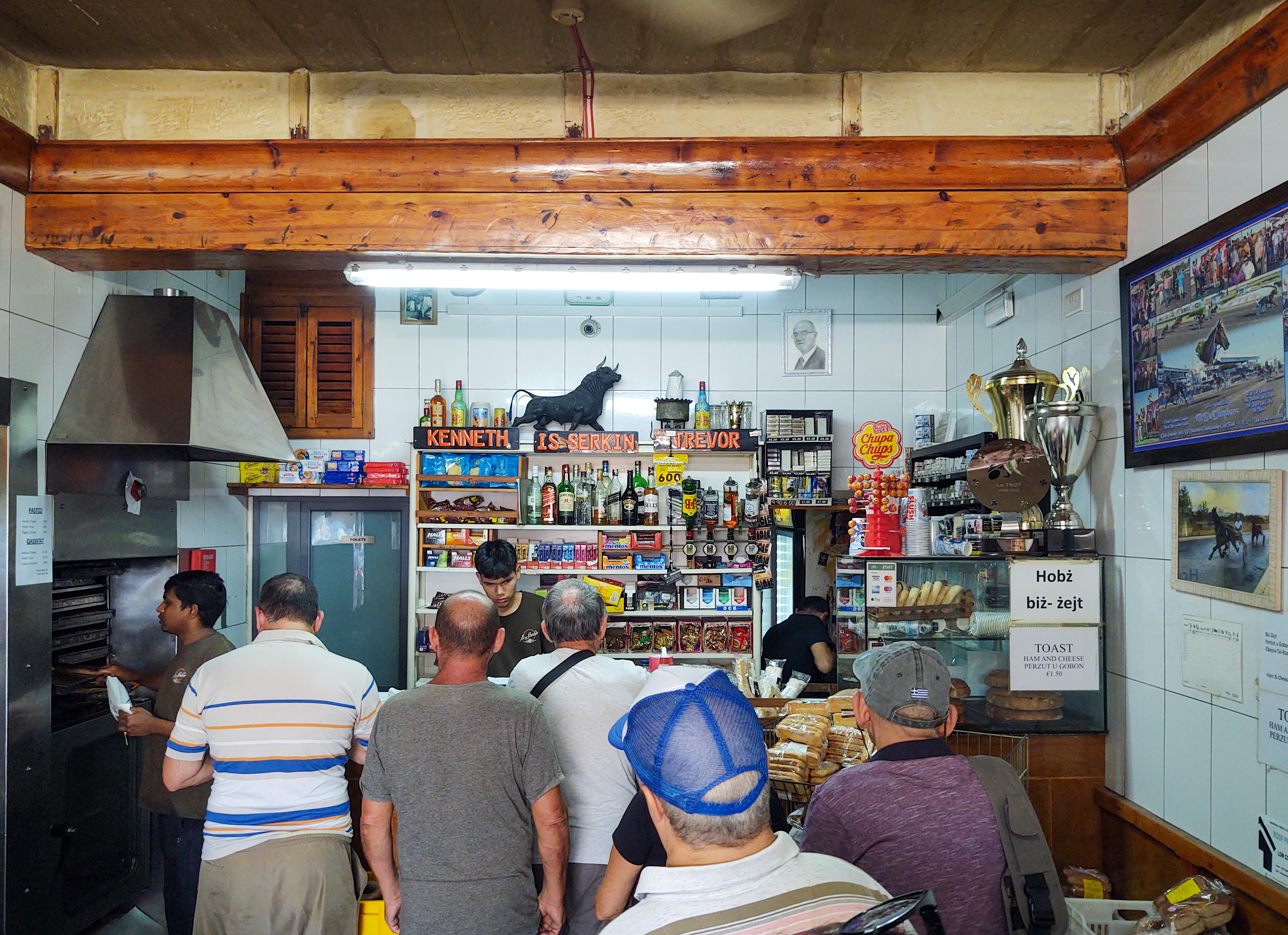
Crystal Palace interior in October 2023

The Crystal Palace or Crystal Palace Bar, also known as Is-Serkin, is a pastizzerija – a bar specialising in pastizzi – in Triq San Pawl in Rabat, Malta. It has been open since 1945 or 1946. It is one of the best-known bars of this kind in the islands.

The name Is-Serkin began with the original owner, Ninu Azzopardi, who received that nickname due to the clientele at his business, who frequently rode in on horse carts called serkin. During the mid-20th century, when the British military had a presence in Malta, soldiers from the Crystal Palace area of London, stationed in nearby Mtarfa, regularly gathered at the pastizzerija to eat and drink, leading it to acquire the name "Crystal Palace". The original owner's son, Martin Azzopardi, took over the business in 1969 or 1970 and ran it until selling it in the late-2010s.

Its pastizzi are prepared off-site and served straight from an oven in the shop, commonly served with a milk tea. Azzopardi attributes the restaurant's popularity to its hours, location, price, and taste, which comes from a recipe kept secret. The business initially operated 24 hours, first to serve soldiers, then farmers, and then people coming out of parties. It later began closing for two hours a day, between midnight and 2:00 AM. Since 2017, the establishment has included an outdoor patio. When the COVID-19 pandemic forced Serkin to close temporarily, Malta Today wrote that it was "like closing down church."

Malta's Prime Minister, Joseph Muscat, hosted three other European leaders (Belgium's Prime Minister Charles Michel, Luxembourg's Prime Minister Xavier Bettel, and Slovenia's Prime Minister Miro Cerar) and their partners at Crystal Palace in 2017. Rival politician Ann Fenech's criticism of the choice of venue drew a public backlash, including memes and hashtags like #jesuispastizz. Fenech subsequently apologized and appeared in a photo at Crystal Palace with the owner's father.
