= Easter Sunday Processions in Malta and Gozo =

Easter Sunday processions are just as popular in Malta and Gozo as the Good Friday manifestations.

== Locations ==
Every year, 19 processions are organised – 14 in Malta (Birgu, Cospicua, Gżira, Mosta, Qormi in the two parishes of St. George and St. Sebastian, Rabat, Senglea, Valletta, Zebbug, Żejtun) and five in Gozo – together with another one in Fontana (Gozo) the following Sunday and preceded by a short procession at Baħrija on Easter Saturday evening.

Some sources estimate the amount of professions held at 25.

== History ==
The processions likely date to the late 16th century.

The Valletta Easter procession is organised by the only Confraternity of the Risen Christ to exist in the Maltese Islands. This confraternity traces its origin to April 1, 1659, when a sodality was instituted in the Greek (Catholic) church of Valletta through a Papal Bull issued by Pope Alexander VII (the former Fabio Chigi, Inquisitor of Malta, 1634–1639).

On June 5, 1892, its members were authorised to wear a white habit, a red girdle and a medallion of the Risen Christ, thus becoming a confraternity. On March 7, 1934, Archbishop Maurus Caruana permitted the transfer of this confraternity from the Greek Church to the Church of the Jesuits, also in Valletta, where it still has its seat today.

It is traditionally held that the Valletta wooden statue of the Risen Christ (L-Irxoxt) is in the Melchiorre Cafà genre which, if correct, would date it to the second half of the 17th century. However, there is no documentation to actually demonstrate the origins of the Valletta procession because many records were destroyed in World War II, when the Greek church was destroyed in air raids.
