= Bigilla =

Maltese dish made with beans

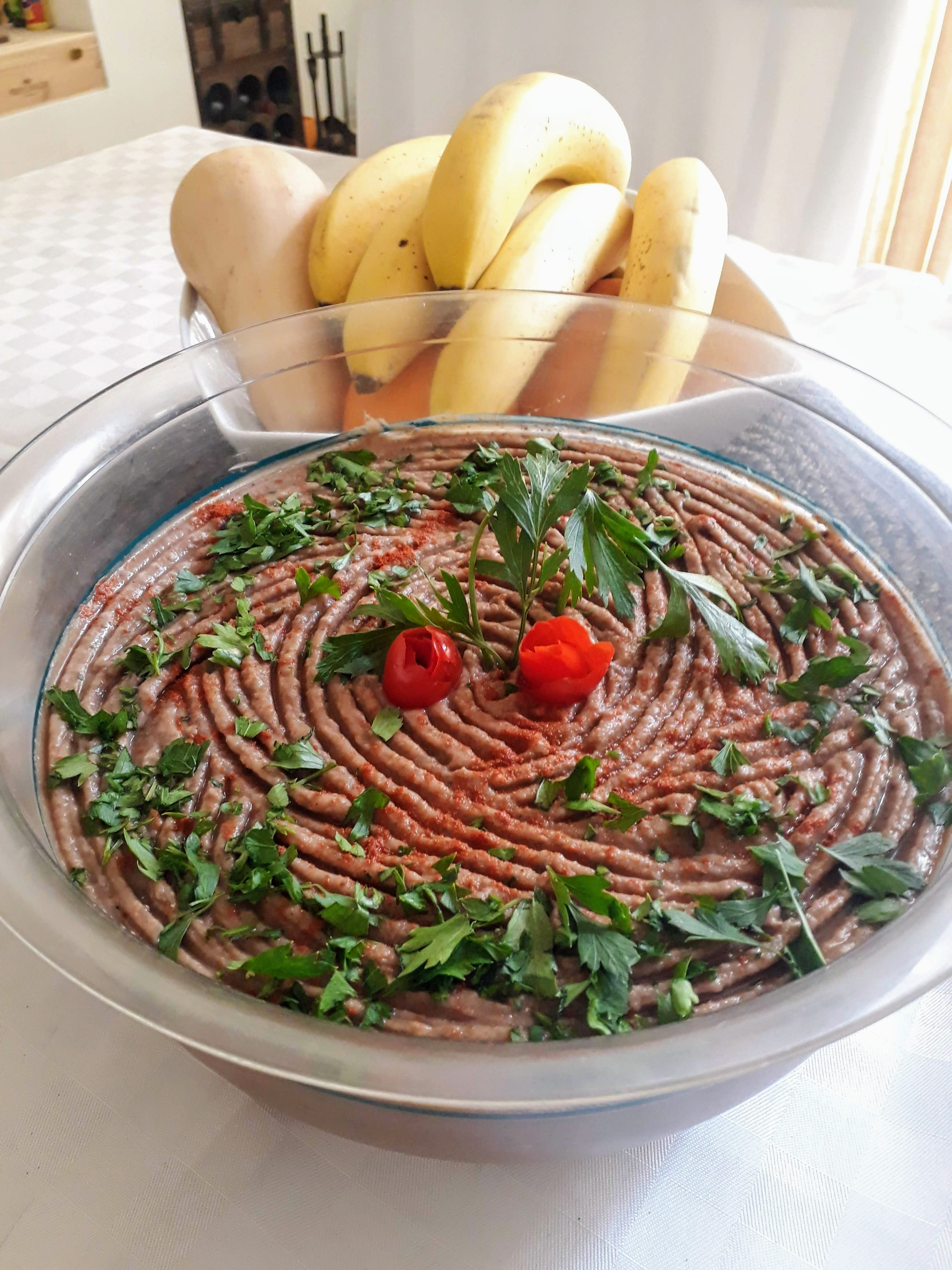
- Bowl of bigilla
- Type: Dip or spread
- Course: Snack or hors d'oeuvre
- Place of origin: Malta
- Main ingredients: Tic beans

Bigilla is a traditional Maltese dish, made of mashed beans, olive oil, salt and red pepper, and usually served as a dip. Bigilla uses tic beans (Maltese: ful ta’ Ġirba, "Djerba beans"), which are similar to broad beans, but smaller and with a darker and harder skin.

Bigilla is served as a snack or an hors d'oeuvre, and is usually eaten as a spread.

== See also ==
- Ful medames
- Bissara
