= Figolla =

Easter pastry with almond filling

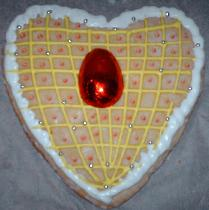
Figolla with the shape of a heart.

Figolla is a Maltese pastry stuffed with a marzipan-like filling and served as an Easter sweet. These are often shaped like hearts, crosses, stars, fish, bunnies, any symbol which links to Christianity, particularly Catholicism, but in modern times these can be shaped into anything the person you give one to is passionate about.

The biscuit base is predominantly made of plain flour, butter/margarine, caster sugar, vanilla essence, eggs, lemon rind and water.

The marzipan-like filling is made of ground almonds, caster sugar, egg whites, and almond essence. Some may also add orange rind or more lemon.

Figolli are generally topped with sugar icing or melted chocolate with hundreds-and-thousands on top.

In Malta, these are baked during Holy Week in the Catholic denomination of Christianity, and given to children/close family or friends to be eaten on Easter Sunday. Some Maltese villages have a tradition where the Figolli are blessed by a priest in the Pjazza outside the church along with modern chocolate Easter Eggs.

Figolli (plural of figolla) are thought to have Ancient Sicilian roots as the word comes from the Sicilian word ‘figulina’ meaning figure. These were also baked for religious purposes and also for victory against invaders such as the Turks who were also made to be figures also in remembrance of those events. These figulina baked in Ancient Sicily, are not as popular in Sicily in modern times, but have stayed and evolved in Malta.

== See also ==
- List of stuffed dishes
