= Imqaret =

Traditional Maltese sweets

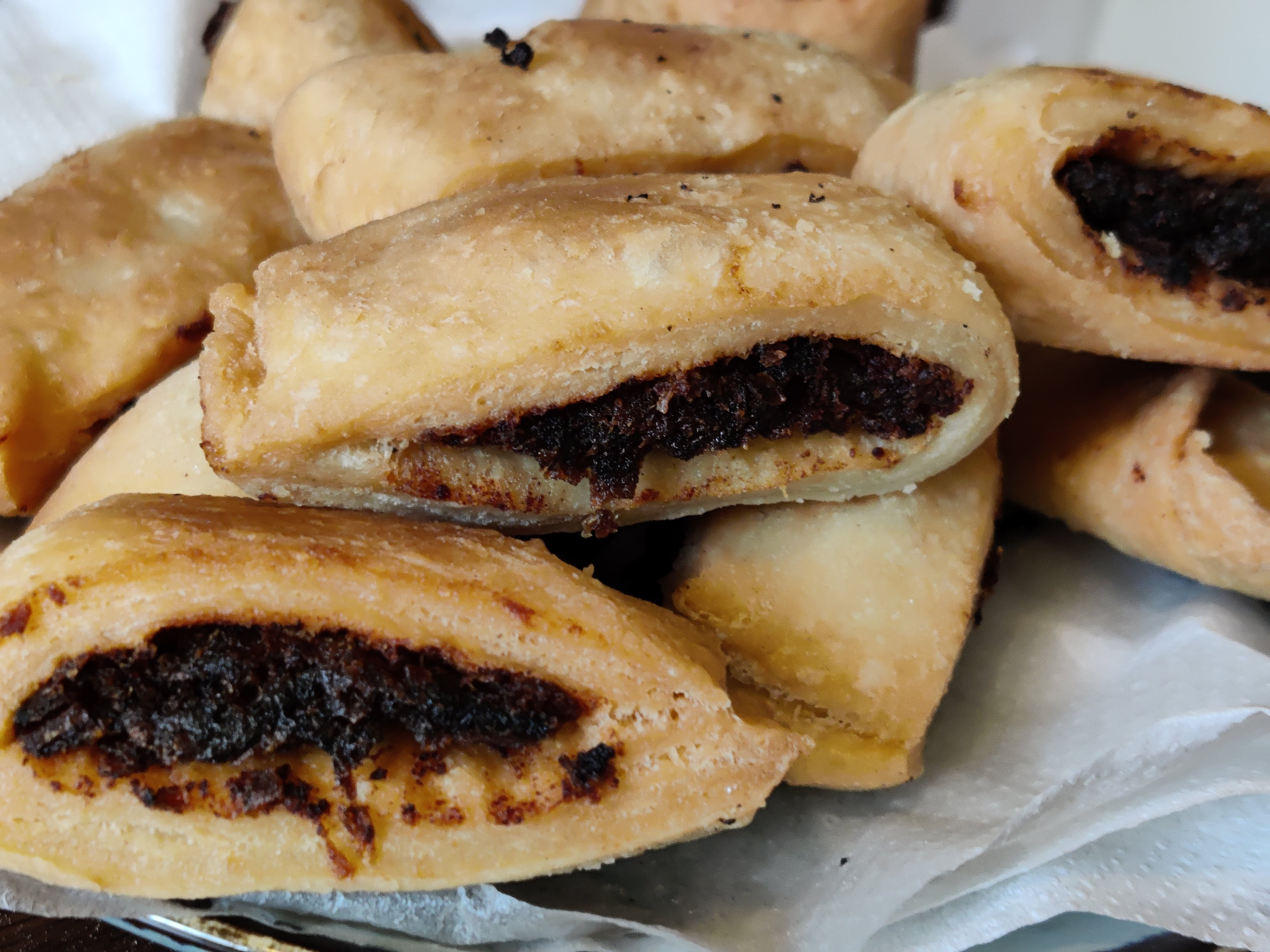
Homemade imqaret, a traditional Maltese pastry with a filling of dates

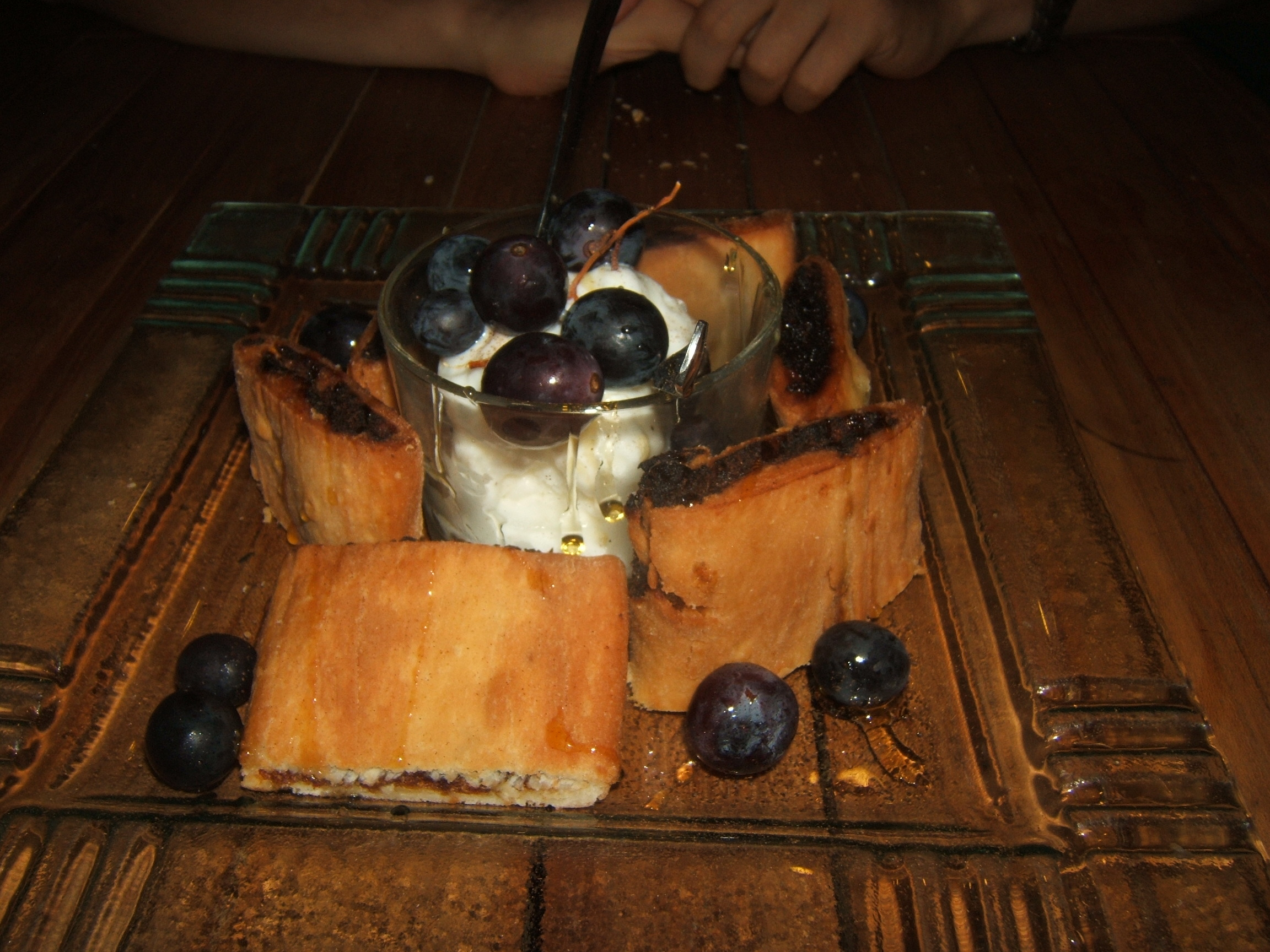
Imqaret served with ice cream, Malta

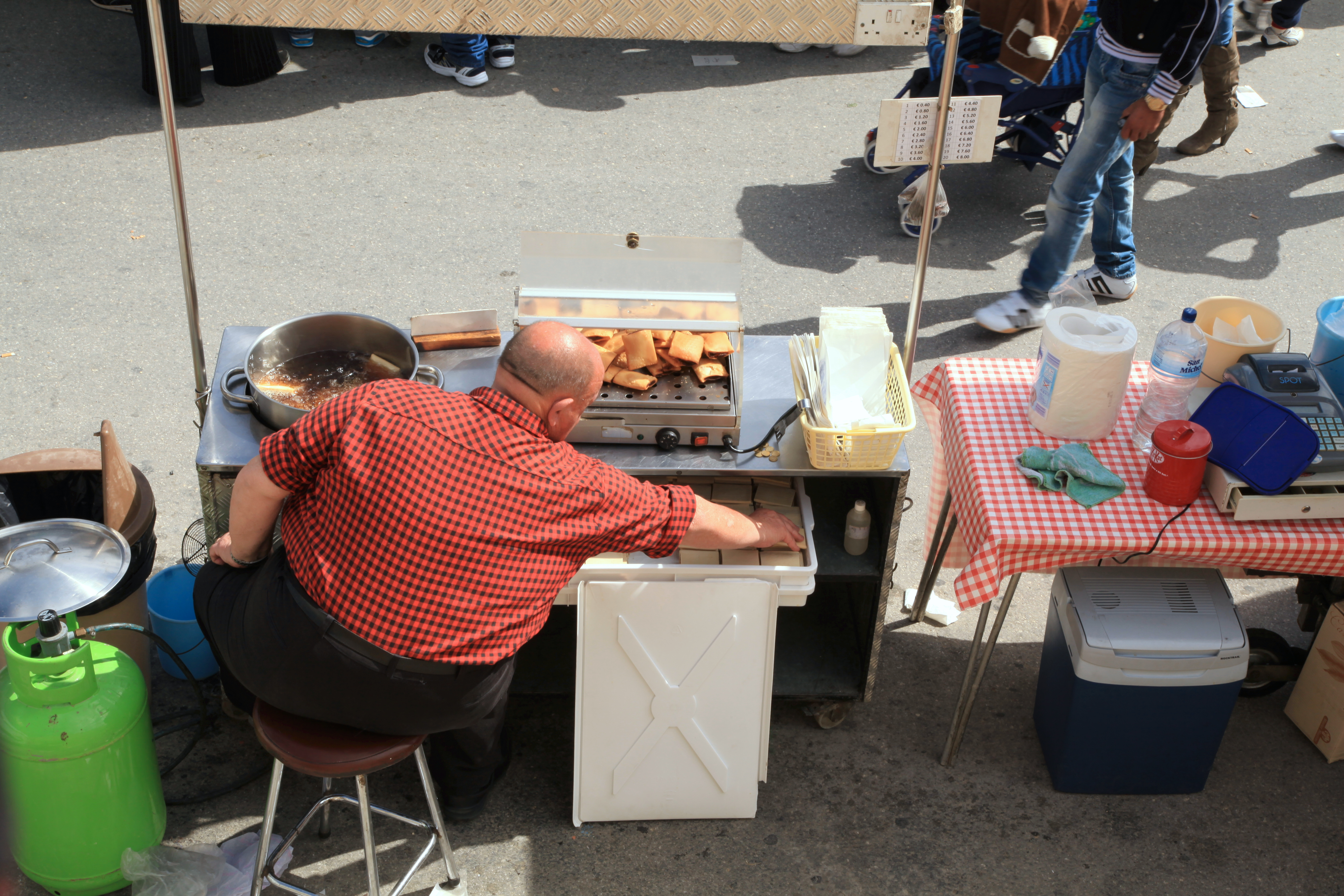
Imqaret street vendor, Marsaxlokk

Imqaret (Maltese pronunciation: [ɪmˈʔɐrɛt]) are traditional Maltese sweets made with pastry and a filling of dates. The word imqaret in Maltese, is the plural of maqrut (diamond-shaped) and it signifies the diamond shape of the sweets – even though in many cases they are sold in a rectangular shape. They are very popular in Malta and they are sold in street markets, as well as in village feasts, in some cases served with ice-cream.

During preparation the imqaret are deep fried and are usually infused with the flavours of aniseed and bay leaf. The imqaret are prepared individually by folding the pastry, in the centre of which a quantity of filling is placed. As the pastry is long, several imqaret pieces are then cut from each pastry following the deep frying process.

Imqaret are of Arabic origin, introduced during the period of the Arab invasion of the island between 870 AD and the 11th century, while a similar sweet named makroudh or maqrud or makroud exists across the sea in Tunisia, which is also popular across Algeria and Morocco with the names makrout, maqrout, mqaret.

== See also ==
- List of street foods
