= Maltese bread =

Sourdough bread from Malta

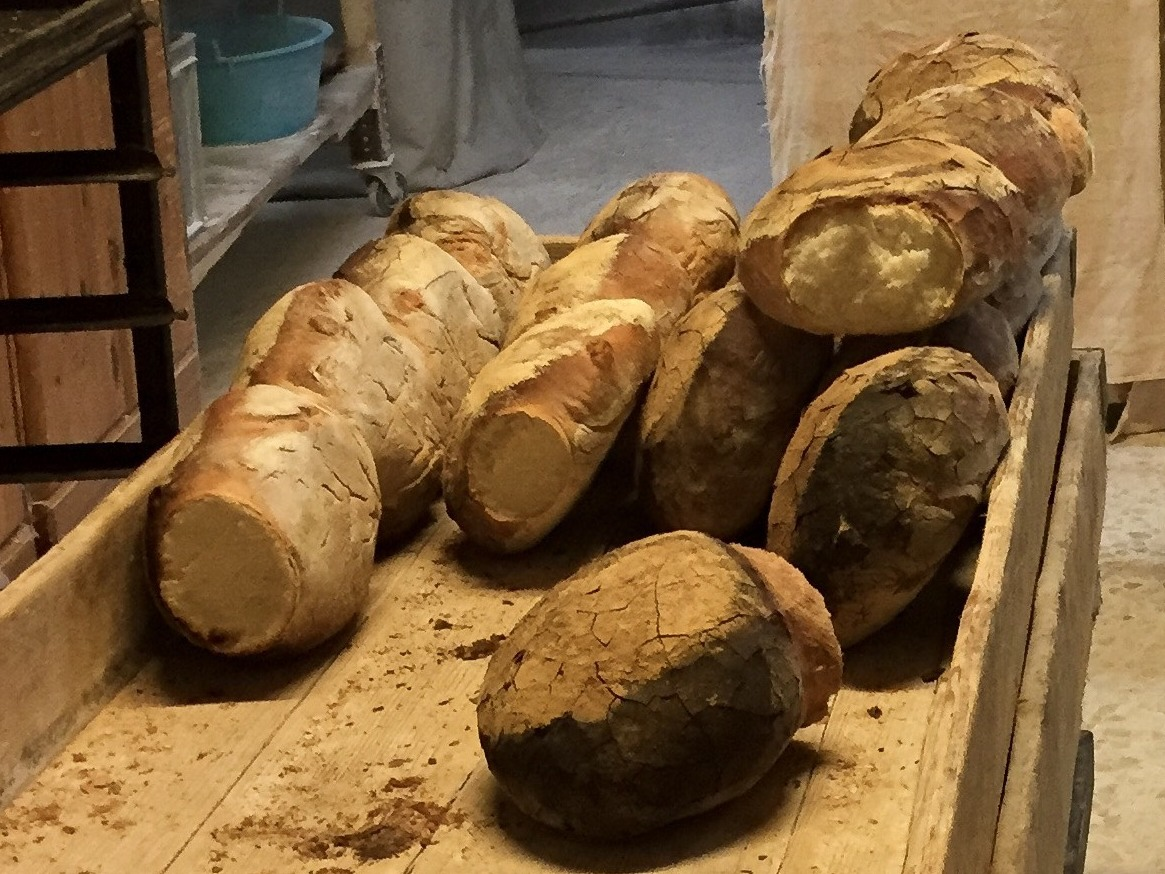
- Maltese bread
- Type: Bread
- Place of origin: Malta
- Region or state: Qormi

Maltese bread (Maltese: Il-Ħobż tal-Malti, tal-malti) is a crusty sourdough bread from Malta, usually baked in wood ovens. It is typically eaten with spread olive oil (Ħobż biż-żejt), where the bread is rubbed with tomatoes (as with the Catalan pa amb tomàquet) or tomato paste, drizzled with olive oil and filled with a choice or mix of tuna, olives, capers, onion, bigilla and ġbejna. The practice of making the bread is considered a 'dying art'.

== In Qormi ==
Qormi is the main city for bread making in Malta, with a large number of bakeries. During the rule of the Knights Hospitaller, it was known as Casal Fornaro meaning the bakers' town. Nowadays an annually held festival, Lejl f'Casal Fornaro (a Night at Casal Fornaro), takes place in Qormi on the third Saturday of October.

== The role of bread in Maltese politics ==
Some of the earliest descriptive accounts of Malta note the dependence of the island's inhabitants on bread for survival. The impact of the British colonial government's liberalisation of the import of grain in 1837 and its failure to provide basic food provisions in the aftermath of World War I are both factors believed to be linked to the Sette Giugno riots.

== Bread in the Maltese language ==
There are a number of idioms in the Maltese language relating to bread as the basis of survival.

- (Maltese: ħobżu maħbuż), his bread is baked, meaning the person is well-off.
- (Maltese: tilef ħobżu), he has lost his bread, meaning the person has lost their job.
- (Maltese: x'ħobż jiekol dan?), what bread does he consume?, an expression used when enquiring after a person's character.
- (Maltese: jeħtieġu bħall-ħobż li jiekol), he needs it like his daily bread, used when a person is in great need of something.
- (Maltese: ħaga li fiha biċċa ħobż ġmielha), something which provides a lot of bread, used to describe a profitable endeavour.
- (Maltese: ma fihiex ħobż), it procures no bread, used to describe a profitless venture.

== See also ==
- Forni della Signoria
- List of breads
