= Kwareżimal =

Vegan Maltese dessert for Lent

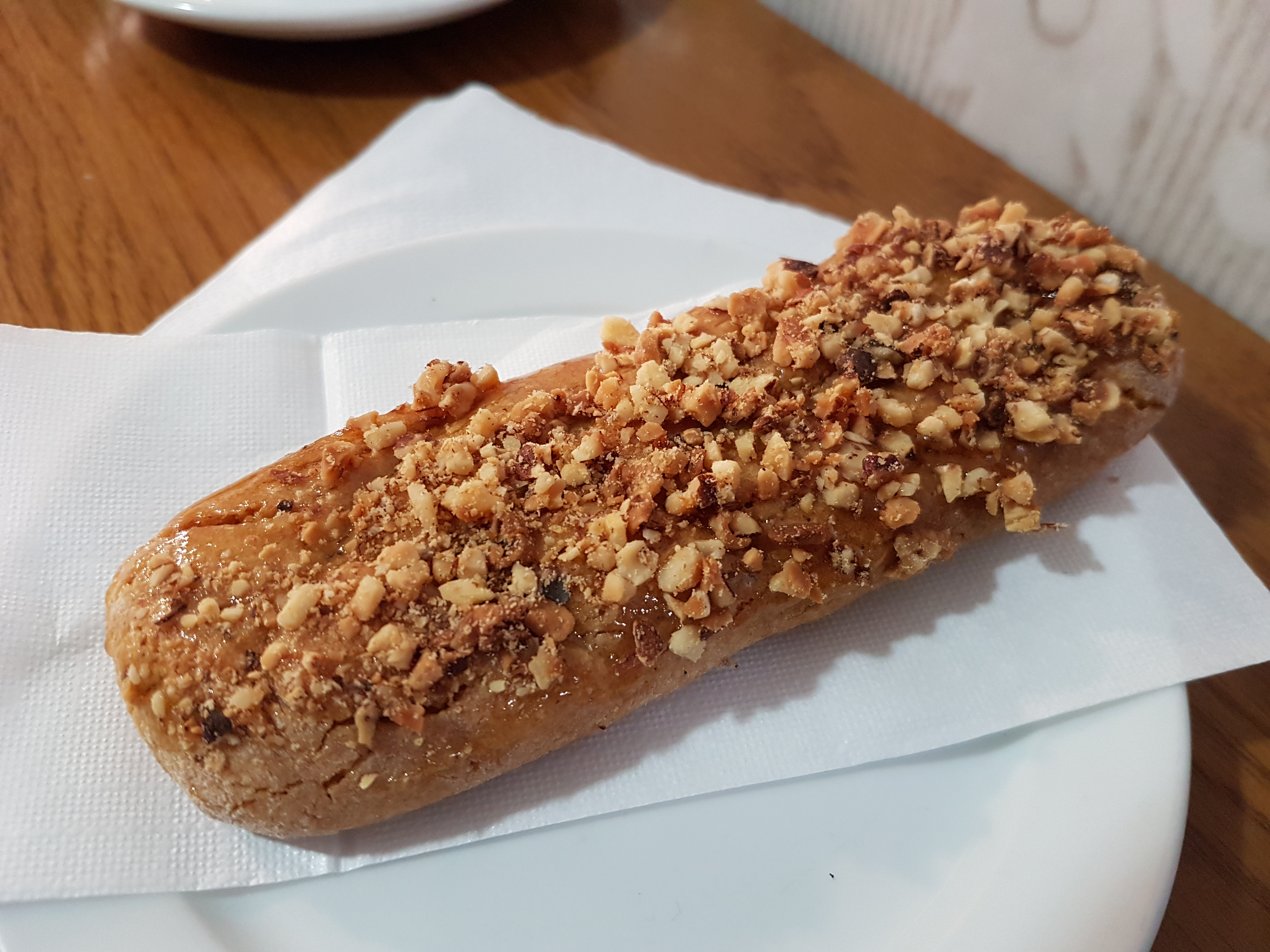
A kwarezimal

A kwarezimal (Maltese: kwareżimal; from Italian Quaresima 'Lent') is a traditional Maltese biscuit, usually baked during Lent. It contains flour, sugar, orange rind and ground almonds (intrita). They are vegan, since they contain no animal protein, eggs, or dairy products.

Tradition holds that the kwarezimal was developed by the Knights of Malta. At the time, sugar was not restricted during Lent as it often is in modern practice, but rather considered a type of spice due to its high cost and humoral qualities.

In medieval Europe, animal products were to be avoided during times of penance. The choice of ingredients may have been limited, but that did not mean that meals were smaller. Neither were there any restrictions against moderate drinking or eating sweets. Banquets held on fish days were popular occasions for serving food that imitated meat, cheese and eggs in various ingenious ways: fish could be molded to look like venison and imitation eggs could be made by stuffing empty egg shells with fish roe and almond milk and cooking on coals.

== History ==
According to lore, and many Bible scholars, St Paul the Apostle was shipwrecked off the coast of Malta in 60 AD on his way to Rome to face trial, and swam safely ashore. St Paul is also said to have introduced Christianity to Malta, making it one of the earliest outposts of the faith.

The era of the Knights of St John reinforced the islands' Christian tradition, and Maltese culture and social life are heavily influenced by its faith (the islands are 98 percent Roman Catholic). Church attendance in Malta is among the highest in Europe, although it is declining. Many traditional Maltese sweets and pastries are only available at certain times of the year, bound to the Catholic liturgical calendar—such as kwareżimal.

Kwareżimal are a kind of chewy biscuit made with spices and ground almonds, a humble recipe originally made without eggs or butter, because during Lent, abstaining from eating animal products or animal meat was considered a penance. (Sugar was not taboo because it was considered a spice and therefore savory.) The word kwareżimal stems from the Italian word quarezima, referring to the 40 days of Lent fasting.
