= Kawlata =

Traditional Maltese vegetable soup

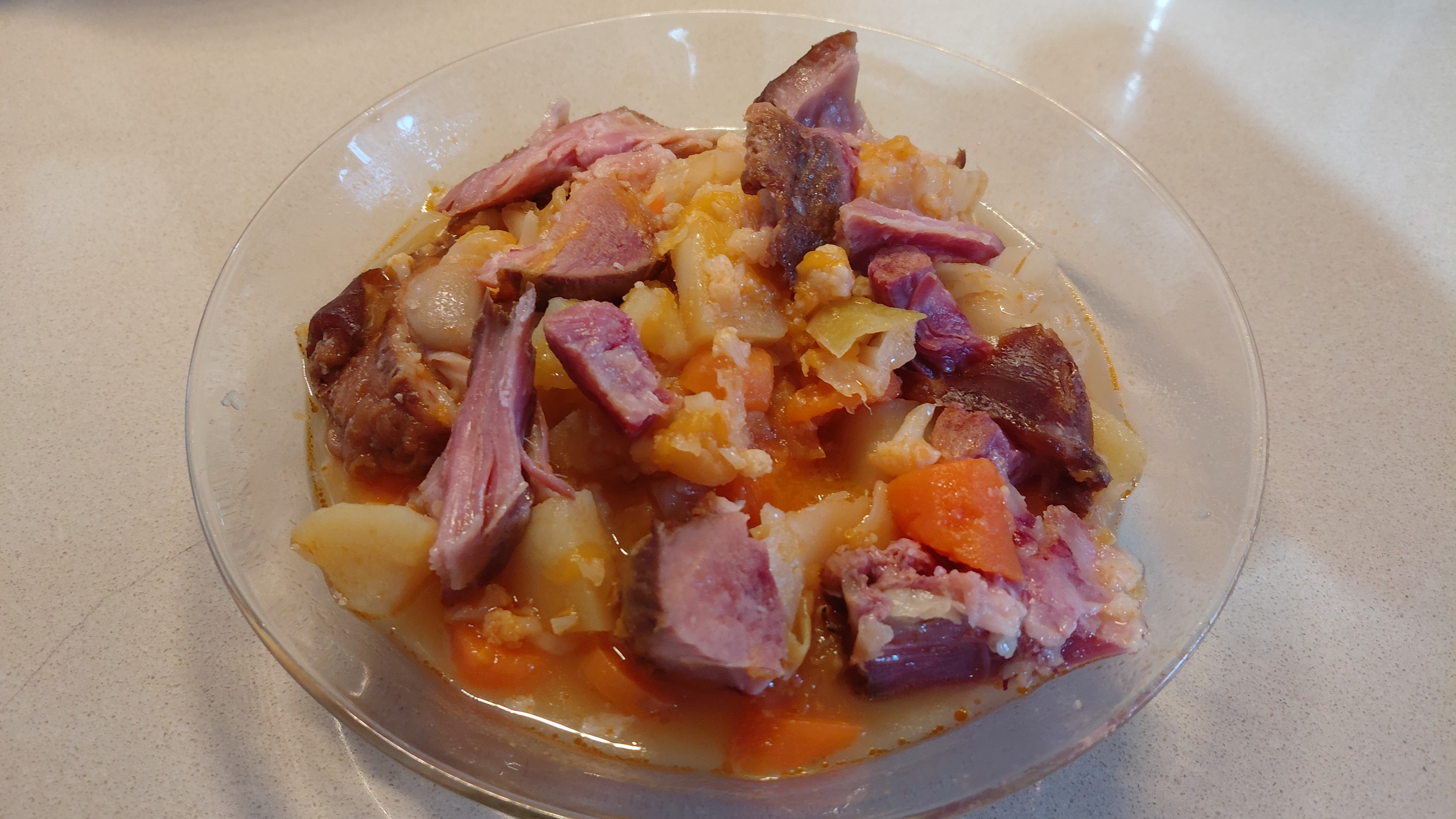
Kawlata

Kawlata is a traditional Maltese vegetable soup, typically made with cabbage and pork, and consumed during the winter months. During World War II, kawlata was a food staple prepared by the Communal Feeding Kitchens.

The first Maltese newspaper was called Il-kawlata maltija ("Maltese Medley").

== See also ==
- List of soups
