= Maltese cuisine =

Culinary traditions of Malta

Maltese cuisine reflects Maltese history, showing strong Italian influences, as well as influences from Spanish, French, Provençal and other Mediterranean cuisines, with some later British culinary influence. Being positioned along important trade routes, having to import most of its foodstuffs, and having to cater to the resident foreign powers who ruled the islands opened Maltese cuisine to outside influences. The traditional Maltese stewed rabbit, stuffat tal-fenek, is often identified as the national dish.

== History ==
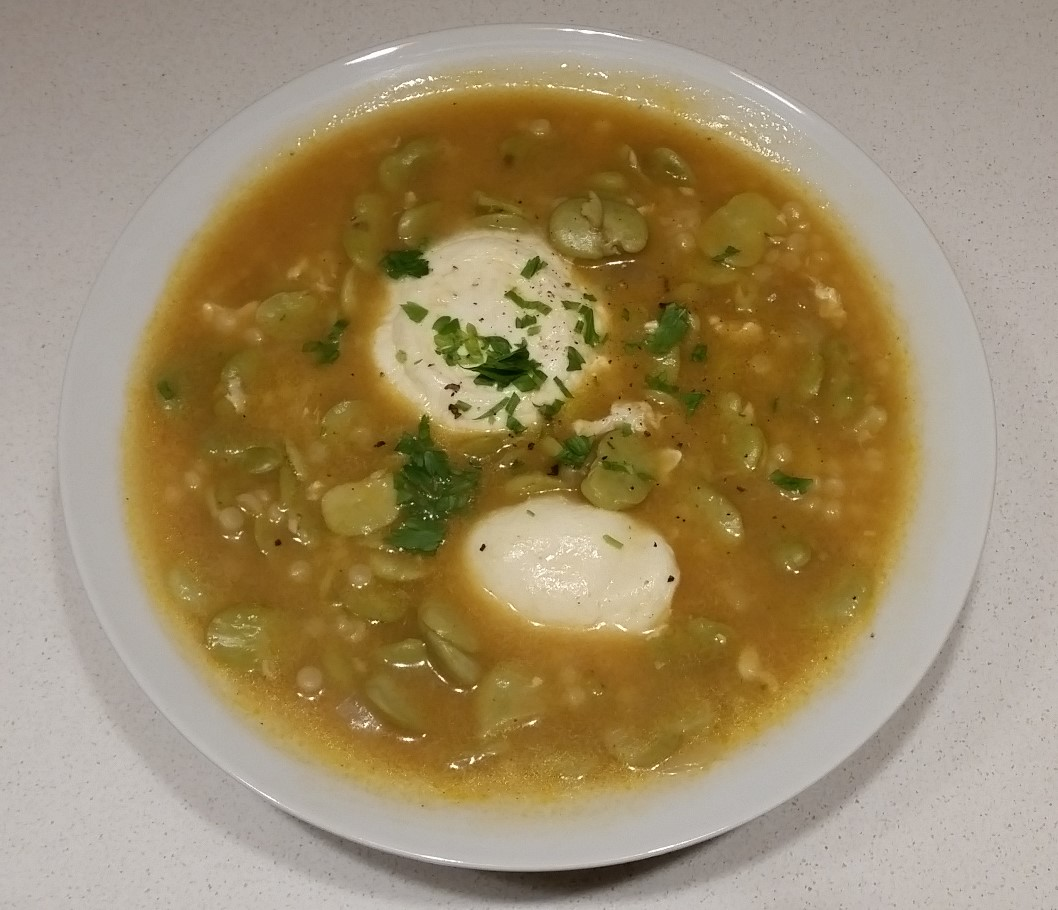
A typical serving of kusksu made with seasonal broad beans

Malta's history and geography, at the center of trade routes, had an important influence on its cuisine. Foreign dishes and tastes were absorbed, transformed and adapted. Italian (specifically Sicilian), Middle Eastern and Arab foods exerted a strong influence, but the presence in Malta of the Knights of St John and the British also brought elements from further afield.

The Knights hailed from many European countries, particularly France, Italy, and Spain, bringing influences from these countries. Aljotta, for example, a fish broth with garlic, herbs, and tomatoes, is the Maltese adaptation of bouillabaisse. The Knights' contacts and wealth brought also food from the New World; it has been suggested that Malta may have been one of the first countries in Europe (after Spain) where chocolate was first tasted.

The British military presence meant a market of a garrison and their families and, later, mass tourism from the United Kingdom. British food products, condiments and sauces like English mustard, Bovril, HP Sauce, and Worcestershire sauce are still a subtle but pervasive presence in Maltese cooking. Other imports were only nominal.

The Maltese word aljoli is one of the variations on aioli across the Mediterranean; the Maltese version of the sauce is based on herbs, olives, anchovies, and olive oil. Similarly, while the Maltese word taġen is related to "tajine", in Maltese the word refers exclusively to a metal frying pan.

== Cuisine and identity ==
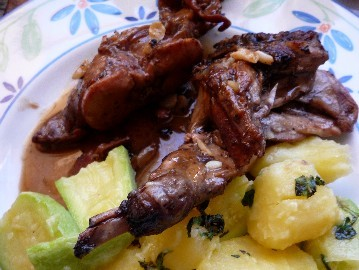
Rabbit fried with wine and garlic

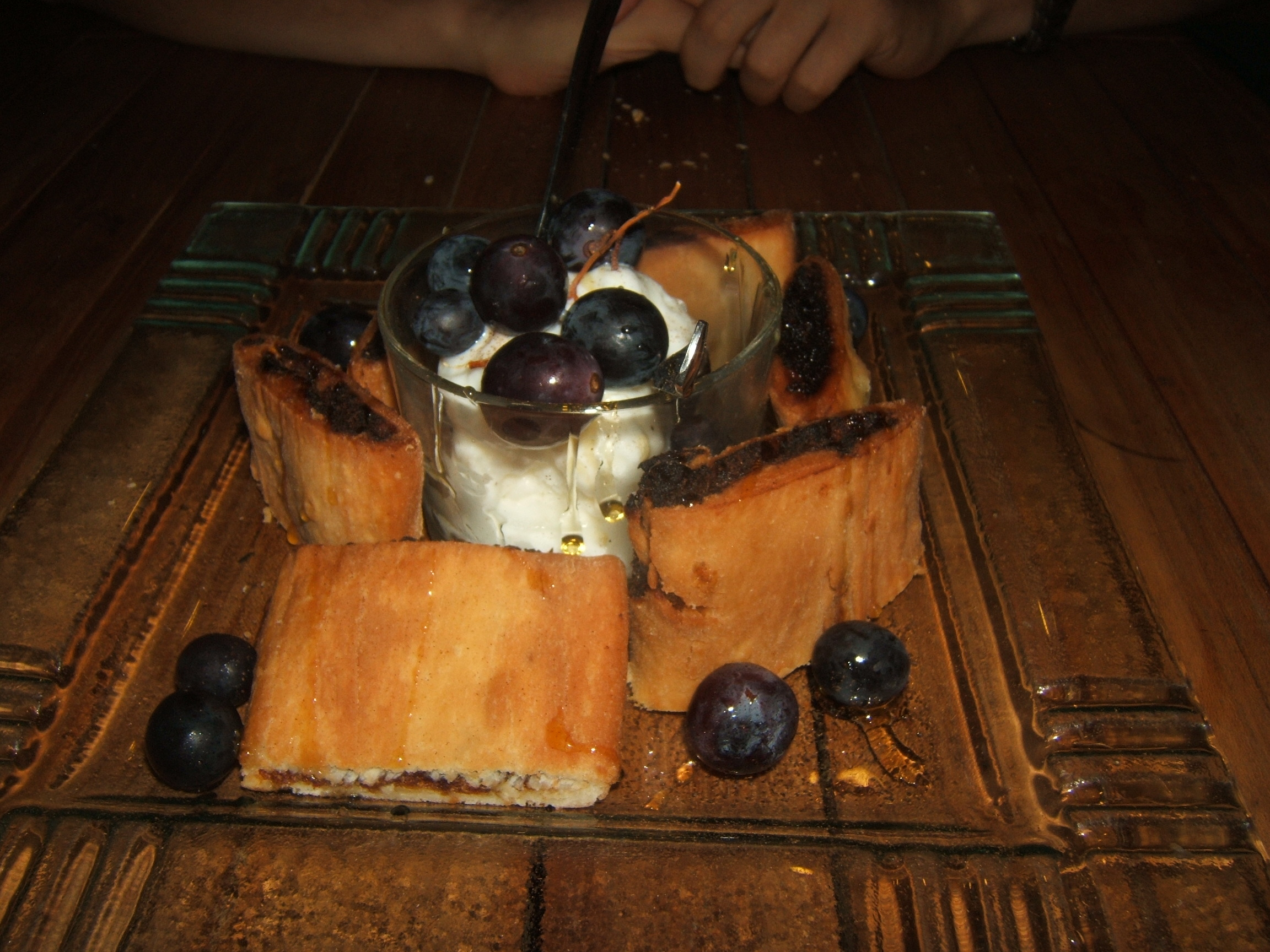
Imqaret served with ice cream

There are a number of junctures in which development in Maltese cuisine related to issues of identity. The most significant example is the traditional Maltese stuffat tal-fenek (rabbit stew), often identified as the national dish, quite possibly started off as a form of symbolic resistance to the hunting restrictions imposed by the Knights of St John. The dish became popular after the lifting of restrictions in the late 18th century (and by which time the indigenous breed, the Tax-Xiber rabbit, had multiplied and prices dropped) and the domestication of rabbits, a technique which could have been imported from France thanks to the French Knights.

The popularity of pork and its presence in various dishes could be attributed to Malta being on the edge of the Christian world. Consuming a food which is prohibited in the Muslim culinary culture could have been a way of self-identification by distinguishing oneself from the other. In addition to pork dishes (such as grilled pork cuts or stuffed flank) and the exclusive predominance of pork in indigenous Maltese sausages, adding some pork to dishes such as kawlata (a vegetable soup) and ross il-forn (baked rice) has been common practice in the Maltese vernacular cuisine for centuries.

For the Café Europe event held during the Austrian Presidency of the EU in 2006, the "representative" Maltese pastry chosen was the maqrut.

== Variations ==
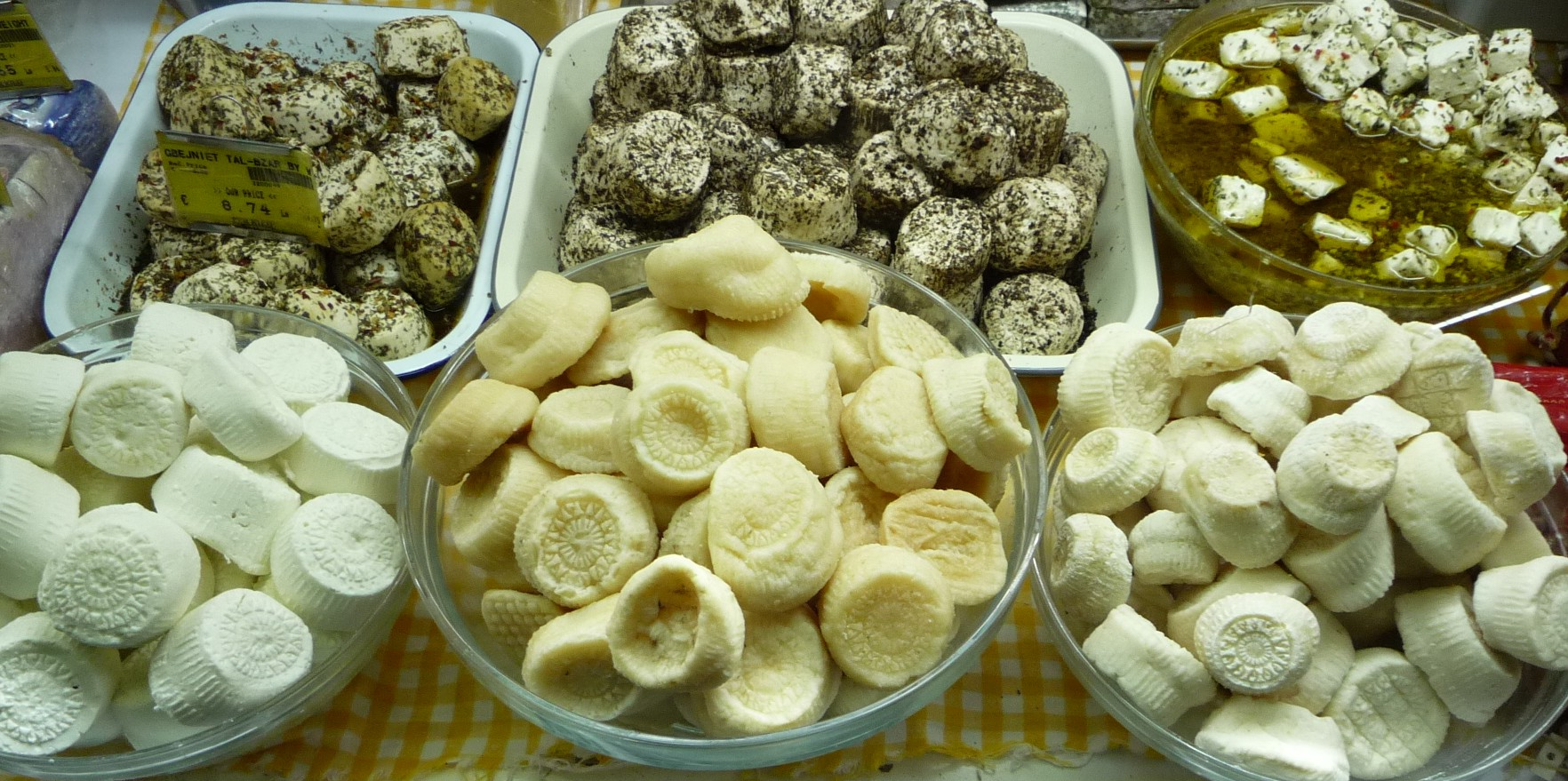
Selection of fresh and cured Ġbejniet

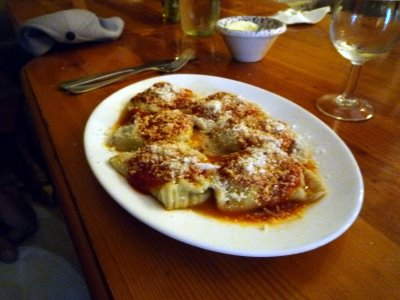
Gozitan ravjul

=== Regional ===
Despite Malta's small size, there are some regional variations, especially with the island of Gozo. This is evidenced in some names such as the Gozitan cheeselet ġbejna (ġbejna t'Għawdex) and ftira Għawdxija, flatbread topped or filled with potatoes or ġbejniet with eggs, grated cheese, tomatoes, anchovies, olives, ricotta, and Maltese sausage as other possible ingredients.

Other Gozitan variants include the use of unusual ingredients. Gozitan cheeselets, for example, are used as filling for ravioli instead of the usual ricotta.

=== Seasonal ===
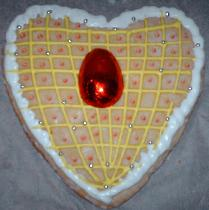
Figolla – the traditional Easter sweet

The strongest seasonal variations are seen in desserts and sweets. Prinjolata, kwareżimal, karamelli tal-ħarrub, ftira tar-Randan, figolla and qagħaq tal-għasel are all examples of sweets associated with a particular season.

Because Catholic fasting during Lent excluded mostly meats and dairy products, fish such as lampuki, whitebait and salted cod were popular dishes during this period, as were stewed snails (Maltese: bebbux), stuffed artichokes (Maltese: qaqoċċ mimli) and fritters (Maltese: sfineġ) of ġbejna, and vegetables.

During Holy Week, bakers also bake a large bagel typically studded with some almonds on top called qagħqa tal-appostli (lit. "apostles' bagel"). Usually coinciding with the spring, there are also seasonal variations to certain dishes at the time of Lent as in, for example, adding fresh broad beans to dishes such as kusksu, a vegetable and pasta dish.

During November, għadam tal-mejtin (lit. "bones of the dead", in Italian: ossa dei morti) are prepared. These are a layer of marzipan sandwiched between sweet pastry and topped with white icing (normal icing and not buttercream icing).

Qagħaq tal-għasel (honey and treacle rings) are a traditional Maltese sweet. They consist of a pastry with a stuffing of sorts inside, made into a ring shape, with slits along the ring for the dark filling to ooze out. The filling is traditionally a mixture of honey, molasses, aniseed, cinnamon, and cloves; some people add cocoa powder for a hint of chocolate. Although traditionally made for Christmas, it became so popular that people started making it all year round, and nowadays many are unaware that it was originally made for Christmas. The ring symbolizes "eternal happiness", and the filling oozes out signifies "overflowing with goodness".

== See also ==
- List of Maltese dishes
- Maltese bread
- Maltese wine
