= Ġbejna =

Maltese cheese made from sheep's milk

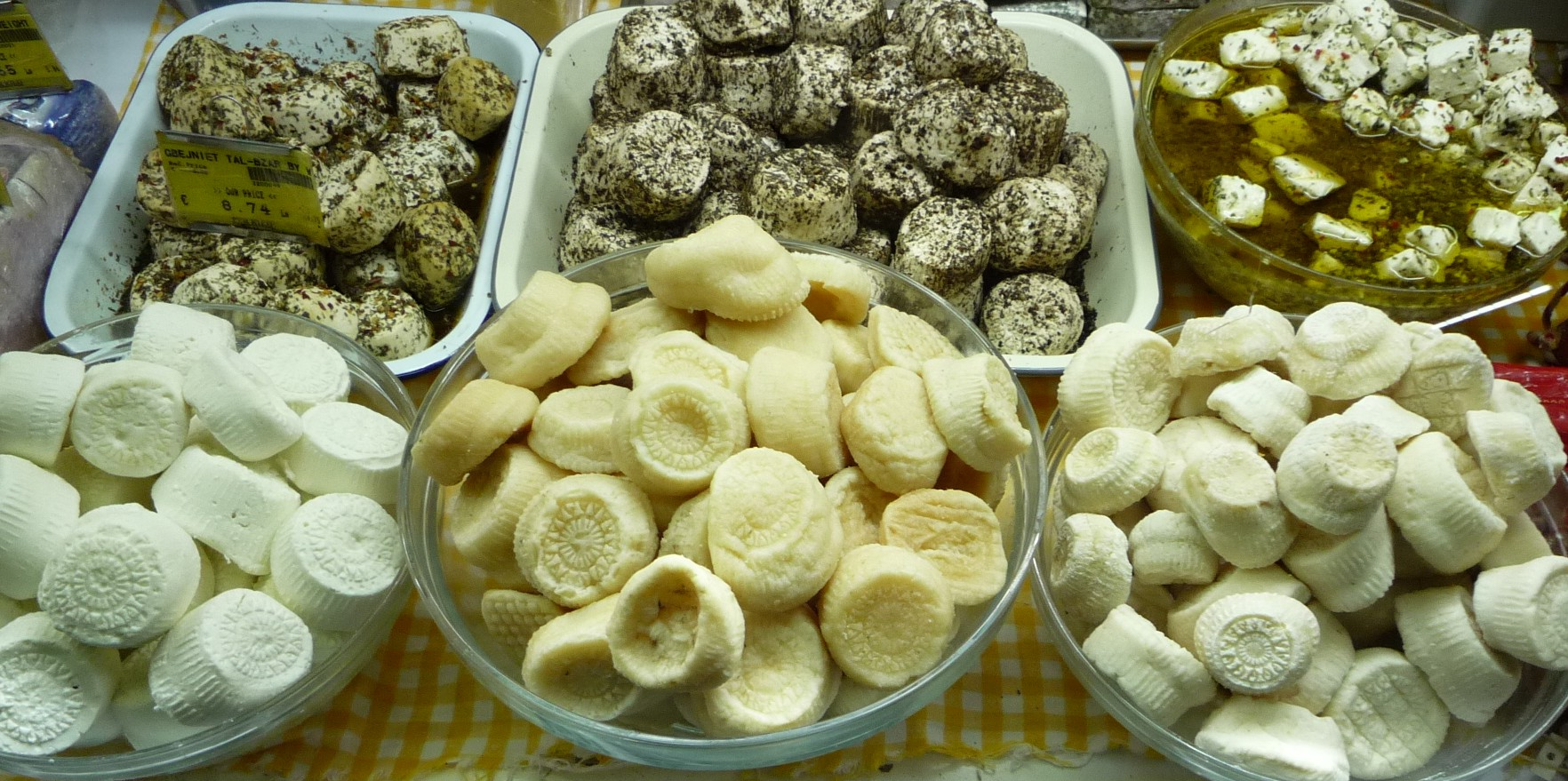
Selection of fresh and cured ġbejniet

Ġbejna (Maltese pronunciation: [ˈd͡ʒbɛɪ̯nɐ]; plural ġbejniet) is a small round cheese made in Malta from sheep milk, salt and rennet. Most sheep's milk produced in Malta is used for the production of these small cheeses.

Ġbejna is the diminutive of the Maltese word ġobna, which means "cheese"; it is synonymous with the Maltese English word "cheeselet", i.e. "little cheese". The fully qualified name Ġbejna tan-nagħaġ means "sheep cheeselet".

Milk in Malta was traditionally sold fresh, immediately after milking goats on the streets. The unpasteurised milk sold was one of the causes of the spread of brucellosis (Maltese: Deni Irqiq) in the late 19th to the early 20th century. Themistocles Zammit is credited with stopping the pandemic.

Malta Competition and Consumer Affair Authority accepted Malta's request to protect the name 'ġbejna' as a Protected Designation of Origin (PDO), however, after national objection period, the application was rejected because the term 'ġbejna' now refer to all cheeselets generically. Following this rejection, the Xirka Produtturi Nagħaġ u Mogħoż applied for the term 'Ġbejna tan-nagħaġ'. This application has undergone scrutiny by the European Commission and has been accepted. It is the first registered Geographical Indication for a Maltese food product.

== Preparation and varieties ==
Ġbejna is shaped in a cheese hurdle made of dried reeds, although now plastic ones are also used. They are traditionally dried in small ventilated rooms, with windows protected by a special mesh mosquito net. It is said by certain individuals that in the past sea water, rather than rennet, was used as a curdling agent. The cheese is available both from pasteurised and unpasteurised milk.

Ġbejniet are prepared and served in a variety of forms: fresh (friski or tal-ilma), sundried (moxxa, bajda or t'Għawdex), salt cured (maħsula), or peppered (tal-bżar). The fresh variety have a smooth texture and a milky flavour and are kept in their own whey in a similar manner to mozzarella. The sundried variety have a more definite, nutty almost musky taste, and are fairly hard. The peppered variety are covered in crushed black pepper and cured, after which they may be stored in oil or pickled in vinegar. Their sharp taste becomes more piquant the more they age, and they also develop a crumbly texture.

== In Maltese cuisine ==
Ġbejna is an important element in a number of dishes such as soppa tal-armla. It is often added to pasta dishes or soup to enhance flavour, as a pizza topping or the filling for ħobż biż-żejt.

Gbejniet are sold in fresh, dried, or cured forms and may be seasoned with pepper or other herbs. It is served deep-fried as an appetizer, cured on a mezze platter or even fresh as a filling for pasta. It is found on restaurant menus, or at a Maltese grocery or supermarket.

== See also ==
- List of cheeses
- Maltese bread
- Maltese cuisine
