= Patriotic soup =

Teochew vegetable soup from Song dynasty

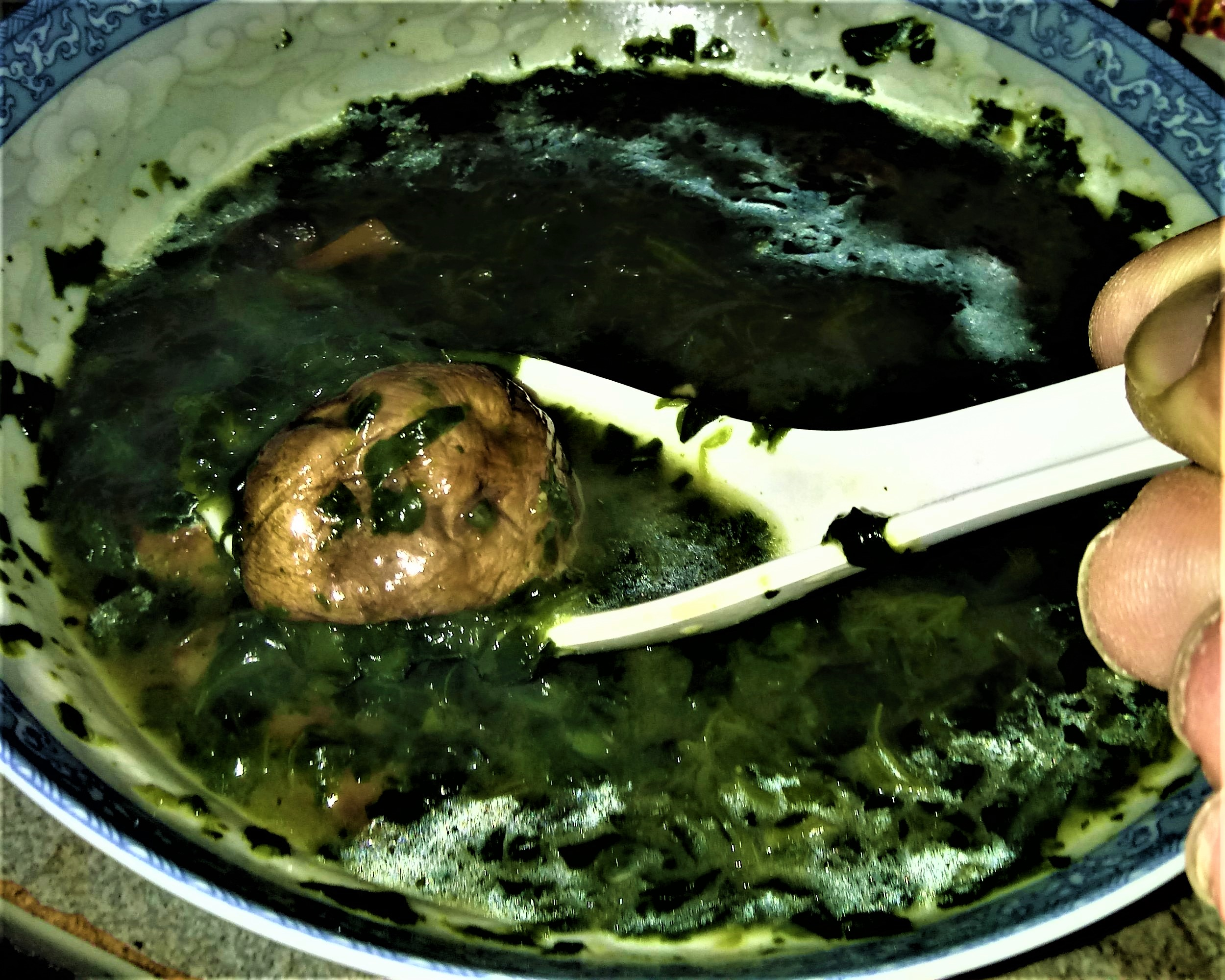
- Homestyle version of the patriotic soup
- Alternative names: Protect the country dish
- Type: Soup
- Place of origin: China
- Region or state: Chaoshan
- Main ingredients: Edible leaf vegetable (amaranth, spinach, ipomoea aquatica, sweet potato leaves, chard or other leafy greens), edible mushrooms (volvariella volvacea, shiitake, black wood ear, cloud ear fungus, white wood ear or other fungi), broth (vegetable, beef, chicken, pork, or other stocks), starch, salt, sesame oil

Patriotic soup
- Traditional Chinese: 護國菜
- Simplified Chinese: 护国菜
- Hanyu Pinyin: hùguó cài
- Literal meaning: Protect the country dish
Transcriptions
Standard Mandarin
- Hanyu Pinyin: hùguó cài
Southern Min
- Teochew Peng'im: hu gog chai

Patriotic soup (simplified Chinese: 护国菜; traditional Chinese: 護國菜; pinyin: hùguó cài; lit. 'protect the country dish', Teochew: hu gog chai) is a vegetable soup originated by Teochew people. It was developed during the final year of China's Song dynasty as an improvisational dish.

== History ==
According to local people from the Guangdong province, prior to the Battle of Yamen, the last emperor of the Song Dynasty, Zhao Bing, and his regime's remnants, sought shelter in a monastery at Chaozhou. The monastery's monks served an impromptu vegetarian soup made of edible plants, edible mushrooms, vegetable broth and lard. The emperor loved the soup and named it "protect the country dish" or "soup for safeguarding the nation" (護國菜). A later generation named it in English "patriotic soup". After Zhao Bing died, the preparation of the soup became a way to honor the last Song emperor. The modern version of Hu Gog Chai may use other vegetables, such as spinach and water spinach.

== Preparation ==
The soup became a part of Teochew cuisine, and its recipe evolved over time. Although the Chinese since the Ming dynasty commonly use sweet potato leaves, other varieties include amaranth, spinach, ipomoea aquatica and other leafy greens; and alternative broths such as beef or chicken. Other ingredients are often added such as beaten eggs, shredded dry cured ham, tofu, cellophane noodles, etc. Guangdong Province's restaurants routinely decorate the soup in a taijitu diagram. However, Chinese restaurants in countries like the United States do not serve this soup because it is not exquisite to their patrons. The most authentic version of the soup typically is homemade and simply prepared just using leaf vegetable, edible mushrooms, and vegetable broth.

== See also ==
- List of soups
- List of vegetable soups
- Mulukhiyah
- Sorrel soup
- Spinach soup
- Watercress soup
