= Spinach in the United States =

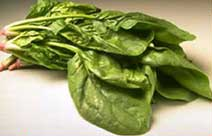
Spinach

Driven by fresh-market use, the consumption of spinach (Spinacia oleracea) has been on the rise in the United States. Per capita use of fresh-market spinach averaged 1 kilogram (2.2 lb) during 2004–2006, the highest since the mid-1940s. The fresh market now accounts for about three-fourths of all US spinach consumed. Much of the growth over the past decade has been due to sales of triple-washed, cello-packed spinach and, more recently, baby spinach. These packaged products have been one of the fastest-growing segments of the packaged salad industry.

== Production ==
The United States is the world’s second-largest producer of spinach, with 3% of world output, following China (PRC), which accounts for 85% of output.

California (73% of 2004–2006 U.S. output), Arizona (12%), and New Jersey (3%) are the top producing states, with 12 other states reporting production of at least 100 acres (2002 census). Over the 2004–2006 period, U.S. growers produced an average of 867 million pounds of spinach for all uses, with about three-fourths sold into the fresh market (includes fresh-cut/processed). According to the 2002 Census of Agriculture, spinach was grown on 1,109 U.S. farms—down 17% from 1997, but about the same number as in 1987.

The farm value of U.S. spinach crops (fresh and processed) averaged $175 million during 2004–2006, with fresh-market spinach accounting for 94%. The value of fresh-market spinach has more than doubled over the past decade as stronger demand has boosted production, while inflation-adjusted prices largely remained constant. California accounts for about three-fourths of the value of both the fresh and processing spinach crops.

== Culinary use and consumption ==
Like other cool-season leafy crops, most (about 96%) of the fresh spinach consumed in the United States is produced domestically. Although rising imports (largely from Mexico) totaled about 23 million pounds in 2004–2006, compared with 3 million pounds in 1994–06. During the last 10 years, exports (largely to Canada) have jumped 70 percent to 47 million pounds (2004–2006), with much of the growth occurring earlier this decade.

Per capita spinach consumption is greatest in the Northeast and Western US. About 80% of fresh-market spinach is purchased at retail and consumed at home, while 91% of processed spinach is consumed at home. Per capita spinach use is strongest among Asians, highest among women 40 and older, and weakest among teenage girls.

Notable dishes in American cuisine with spinach as a main ingredient include spinach salad, spinach soup, and spinach dip.

== Food poisoning outbreaks ==
=== E. coli, 2006 ===
In September 2006, an outbreak of disease caused by the E. coli strain O157:H7 occurred in 21 US states. Over 100 cases were reported, including five deaths. The E. coli was linked to bags of fresh organic spinach, after which the FDA issued a warning not to eat uncooked fresh spinach or products containing it. The U.S. Food and Drug Administration (FDA) issued a press release updating the available information. According to the FDA release on October 4, 2006, 192 cases of E. coli O157:H7 infection have been reported to the Centers for Disease Control and Prevention, including 30 cases of hemolytic uremic syndrome; there was one death and 98 hospitalizations. The infection affected 26 states. By early 2007, there were 206 illnesses and three deaths attributed to E. coli-tainted spinach.

Based on epidemiological and laboratory evidence, the FDA determined the implicated spinach originated from an organic spinach field grown by Mission Organics and processed by Natural Selection Foods LLC of San Juan Bautista, California. The FDA speculated the spinach had been tainted by irrigation water contaminated with pig feces because feral pigs were seen in the vicinity of the implicated ranch.

=== Salmonella, 2007 ===
On August 30, 2007, 8,000 cartons of spinach (from Metz Fresh, a King City–based grower and shipper, Salinas Valley, California) were recalled after Salmonella was discovered upon routine testing. Consumer advocates and some lawmakers complained it exposed significant gaps in food safety, even if 90% of suspect vegetables did not reach the shelves.

== See also ==
- Agriculture in the United States
- Popeye the Sailor Man, a fictional cartoon character created by the American cartoonist Elzie Crisler Segar
- Stockton Cannery Strike of 1937, known as the Spinach Riot
