= Cabbage soup =

Soup dish

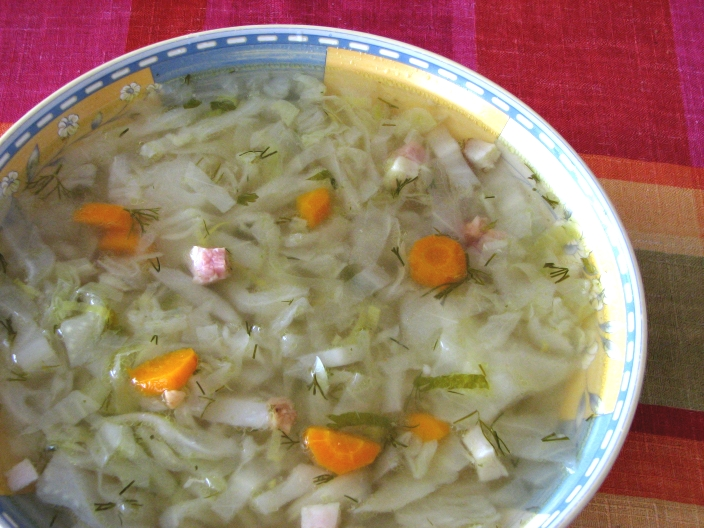
- Type: Soup
- Serving temperature: Hot
- Main ingredients: Sauerkraut/white cabbage
- Ingredients generally used: Stock (fish, mushroom, or pork) or fat, vegetables,
- Other information: Shchi is generally made with cabbage. Borscht can be a cabbage soup as well.

Cabbage soup may refer to any of the variety of soups based on various cabbages, or on sauerkraut and known under different names in national cuisines. Often it is a vegetable soup, with lentils, peas or beans in place of the meat. It may be prepared with different ingredients. Vegetarian cabbage soup may use mushroom stock. Another variety is using a fish stock. There is also a preference to cook cabbage soup using a pork stock.

== In national cuisines ==
Cabbage soup is popular in Russian, Polish, Slovak and Ukrainian cuisine.

It is known as kapuśniak or kwaśnica in Polish, kapustnica in Slovak, and капусняк (kapusniak) in Ukrainian. It would be щи (shchi) in Russian, however.

The same goes to Czech (zelňačka or zelná polévka), German (Kohlsuppe or Krautsuppe), French (soupe aux choux) cuisine, Finnish (kaalikeitto) and Swedish (kålsoppa).

== Shchi ==
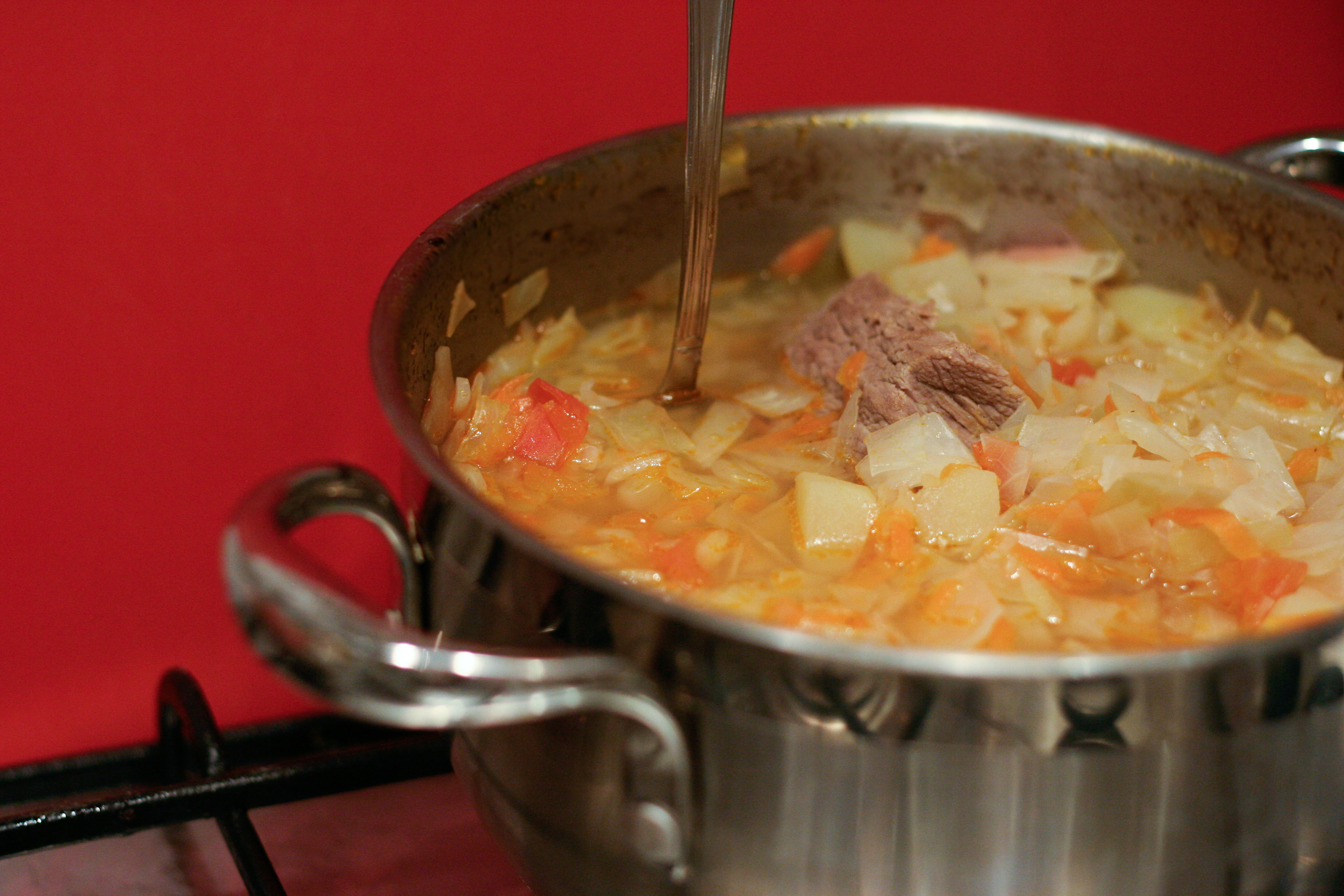
Cabbage-based soup known as shchi

Shchi (Russian: щи) is a national dish of Russia. While commonly it is made of cabbage, dishes of the same name may be based on dock, spinach or nettle.

- The sauerkraut variant of cabbage soup is known to Russians as "sour shchi" ("кислые щи"), as opposed to fresh cabbage shchi. An idiom in Russian, "Профессор кислых щей" ("sour shchi professor"), is used to express an ironic or humorous attitude toward a person who makes a pretense of having considerable knowledge.

=== Borscht as a cabbage soup ===
The mid-19th-century Explanatory Dictionary of the Living Great Russian Language defines borshch as "a kind of shchi" with beet sour added for tartness.

== Kapuśniak ==
There is a Polish cabbage soup known as kapuśniak, where drained and chopped sauerkraut is cooked in water with chopped pork, pieces of kielbasa and a bit of salt until the meat is almost tender. Instead of meat, a ready broth is also used. Afterwards, diced potatoes and carrots are added and boiled until they are cooked. Tomato paste and spices may be added. In some regions the soup is served with added flour and butter. A lean kapuśniak is cooked with roots and fungi.

Kapuśniak is served hot, in some regions with sour cream and sprinkled with chopped parsley and dill.

== Skābu kāpostu zupa ==
In most of Latvia sauerkraut soup (Latvian: skābu kāpostu zupa) is made with sauerkraut, potatoes, carrots and groats, but in the region of Latgale only sauerkraut and bacon is used.

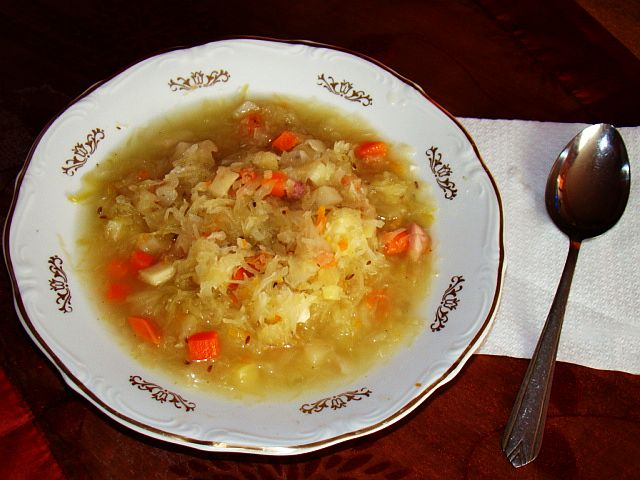

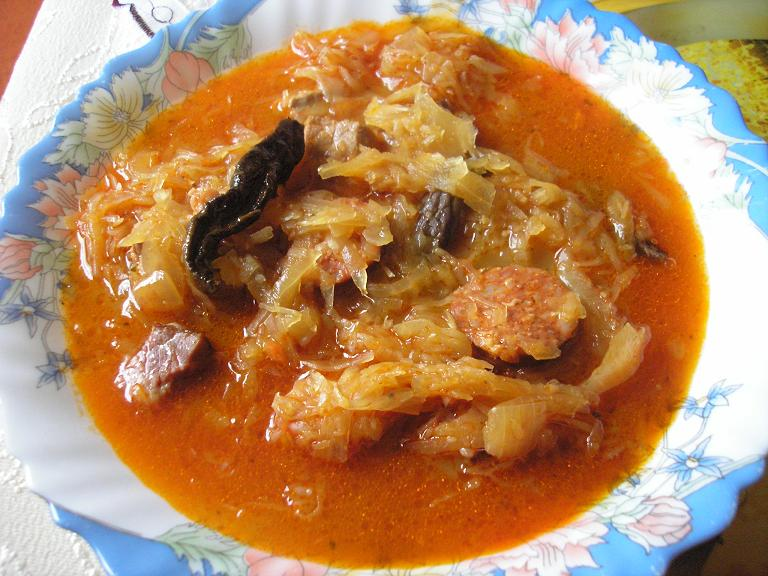

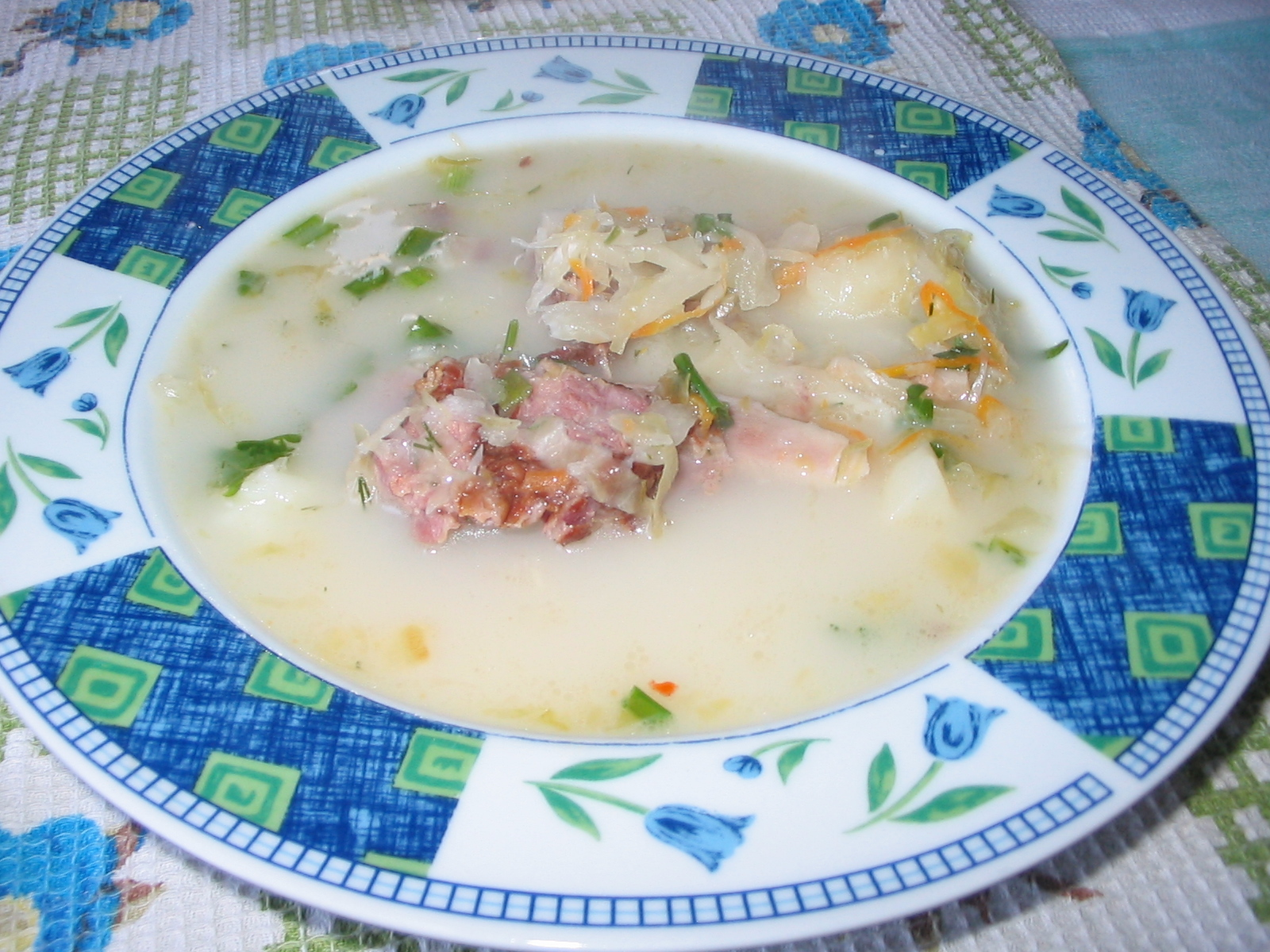

== Swedish cabbage soup ==
Swedish cabbage soup is usually made from white cabbage, which is browned before being boiled, and seasoned with generous amounts of allspice and sometimes served with boiled meatballs.

== Caldo verde ==
There are various soups made with vegetables that are the same species as cabbage, but come in different form, such as caldo verde soup, made of collard.

== In popular culture ==
In Charlie and the Chocolate Factory and its movie adaptations, the protagonist's family is so poor that one of the only foods they can afford to eat is cabbage soup.

Louis de Funès was the protagonist of the French film La Soupe aux choux (Cabbage Soup).

Catherine the Great, a Russian tsarina of German origin, initially notorious at the Russian court for her poor command of Russian, was quipped to be capable of making seven misspellings in the two-letter Russian word Щи (in Cyrillic spelling), which became Schtschi in German.

== See also ==
- Borscht
  - Borscht without beets
- Cabbage soup diet, a fad diet involving heavy consumption of cabbage soup
- Cabbage stew
- Cabbage rolls
- Caldo gallego
- List of cabbage dishes
- List of soups
- List of vegetable soups
- Spinach soup
- Watercress soup
- Comfort food

== Sources ==
- Клиновецька З. Страви й напитки на Україніі — Київ — Львів 1913 р.—С.4
- Кулинария, Государственное издательство торговой литературы — Москва 1959 г. — С.57
- Українські страви. К.:Державне видавництво технічної літератури УРСР. 1961. 454 с.
