= Jamie's 30-Minute Meals =

2010 British television series

- Starring: Jamie Oliver (host)
- Narrated by: Jamie Oliver
- Country of origin: United Kingdom
- Original language: English
- No. of seasons: 1
- No. of episodes: 40

Production
- Running time: UK: half an hour (approx. 0:27 per episode)

Original release
- Network: Channel 4
- Release: 11 October – 3 December 2010

Jamie's 30-Minute Meals is a series of 40 episodes aired in 2010 on Channel 4 in which Jamie Oliver cooks a three- to four-dish meal in under 30 minutes. The show premiered on 11 October 2010 and aired over eight weeks, ending on 3 December 2010.

On September 30, 2010, a cookbook of the same name was released. It became the fastest-selling non-fiction work of all time, selling 735,000 copies in its first 10 weeks on sale.

== Episodes ==
Episode	Dishes cooked
S01E01 – Killer Jerk Chicken	Jerk Chicken, Rice and Beans, Chopped Salad, Chargrilled Corn
S01E02 – Jools's Pasta	‘Jool's Pasta’, Crunchy Chicory and Watercress Salad, Frangipane Tarts
S01E03 – Sea Bass and Crispy Pancetta	Sea Bass and Crispy Pancetta, Sweet Potato Mash, Asian Greens, Berry Ice Cream, Sparkling Lemon Ginger Drink
S01E04 – Sardines	Sardines, Crispy Halloumi, Watercress Salad, Figs, Chocolate Mousse
S01E05 – Steak Sarnie	Steak Sarnie, Crispy New Potatoes, Cheesy Mushrooms, Beetroot Salad
S01E06 – Duck Salad	Duck Salad, Giant Croutons, Rice Pudding with Stewed Fruit
S01E07 – Spinach & Feta	Spinach and Feta Filo Pie, Cucumber Salad, Tomato Salad, Coated Ice Cream
S01E08 – Oozy Mushroom Risotto	Oozy Mushroom Risotto, Spinach Salad, Lemon and Raspberry Cheesecake
S01E09 – Asian Style Salmon	Asian-Style Salmon, Noodle Broth, Beansprout Salad, Lychee Dessert
S01E10 – Roast Beef	Roast Beef, Yorkshire Pudding, Little Carrots, Crispy Potatoes, Red Onion Mushroom Gravy
S01E11 – Chicken Pie	Chicken Pie, French-style Peas, Sweet Carrot Smash, Berries with Shortbread and Chantilly Cream
S01E12 – Wonky Summer Pasta	Wonky Summer Pasta, Herby Salad, Drop Pear Tartlets
S01E13 – Stuffed Focaccia	Focaccia Stuffed with Prosciutto and Celeriac Remoulade, Dressed Mozzarella, Fresh Lemon and Lime Granita
S01E14 – Tasty Crusted Cod	Tasty Crusted Cod,‛My Mashy Peas’, Tartare Sauce, Warm Garden Salad
S01E15 – Thai Red Prawn Curry	Thai Red Prawn Curry, Jasmine Rice, Grilled Spicy Prawns, Cucumber Salad, Papaya Platter
S01E16 – Summer Veg Lasagne	Summer Veg Lasagne, Tuscan Tomato Salad, Mango Frozen Yoghurt in Baby Cornets
S01E17 – Smoky Haddock Corn Chowder	Smoky Haddock Corn Chowder, Spiced Tiger Prawns, Rainbow Salad, Raspberry and Elderflower Slushie
S01E18 – Rib Eye Stir Fry	Rib Eye Stir Fry, Dan Dan Noodles, Steamed Greens with Black Bean Sauce, Chilled Hibiscus Tea
S01E19 – Kinda Sausage Cassoulet	Kinda Sausage Cassoulet, Warm Broccoli Salad, Berry and Custard Pie
S01E20 – Piri Piri Chicken	Piri Piri Chicken, Dressed Potatoes, Rocket Salad, Portuguese Tarts
S01E21 – British Picnic	Sausage Rolls, Mackerel Pâté, Asparagus, Crunchy Salad, Pimm's Eton Mess
S01E22 – Fish Tray Bake	Fish Tray-Bake with Jersey Royals, Salsa Verde, Spinach Salad, Banoffee Pie
S01E23 – Cauliflower Macaroni	Cauliflower Macaroni, Chicory Salad with ‛Insane Dressing’, Stewed Fruit
S01E24 – Moroccan Lamb	Moroccan Lamb Chops, Flatbreads, Herby Couscous, Stuffed Peppers and Pomegranate
S01E25 – Rogan Josh Curry	Rogan Josh Curry, Fluffy Rice, Carrot Salad, Poppadoms, Flatbread
S01E26 – Crispy Salmon	Crispy Salmon, Jazzed-Up Rice, Baby Courgette Salad, Guacamole, Berry Spritzer
S01E27 – Spaghetti	Spaghetti Alla Puttanesca, Crunchy Salad, Garlic Bread, Silky Chocolate Ganache
S01E28 – Thai Green Curry	Thai Green Curry with Crispy Chicken, Kimchee Slaw, Rice Noodles
S01E29 – Tapas Feast	Tortilla, Glazed Chorizo, Manchego Cheese, Cured Meats, Honey, Stuffed Peppers, Rolled Anchovies
S01E30 – Spring Lamb	Spring Lamb, Vegetable Platter, Mint Sauce, Chianti Gravy, Chocolate Fondue
S01E31 – Sticky Pan-Fried Scallops	Sticky Pan-Fried Scallops, Sweet Chili Rice, Dressed Greens, Brownies
S01E32 – Mustard Chicken	Mustard Chicken, Dauphinoise Potatoes, Greens, Black Forest Affogato
S01E33 – Trapani-Style Rigatoni	Trapani-Style Rigatoni, Griddled Chicory Salad, Rocket and Parmesan Salad, Limoncello Tiramisu
S01E34 – Chicken Skewers	Chicken Skewers, Satay Sauce, Fiery Noodle Salad, Fruit and Mint Sugar
S01E35 – Cheat's Pizza	Cheat's Pizza, Three Salads, Squashed Cherries and Vanilla Mascarpone Cream
S01E36 – Super-fast Beef Hash	Super-Fast Beef Hash, Jacket Potatoes, Goddess Salad, Baked Butter Beans
S01E37 – Smoked Salmon	Smoked Salmon, Potato Salad, Beets and Cottage Cheese, Rye Bread, Homemade Butter
S01E38 – Broccoli Orecchiette	Broccoli Orecchiette, Courgette and Bocconcini Salad, Prosciutto and Melon Salad
S01E39 – Stuffed Cypriot Chicken	Stuffed Cypriot Chicken, Pan-Fried Asparagus, Vine Tomatoes, Cabbage Salad, St. Clements and Vanilla Ice Cream Float
S01E40 – Steak Indian-Style	Steak Indian-Style, Spinach and Paneer Salad, Naan Breads, Mango Dessert
