= Sorrel soup =

Cold vegetable soup of Eastern Europe

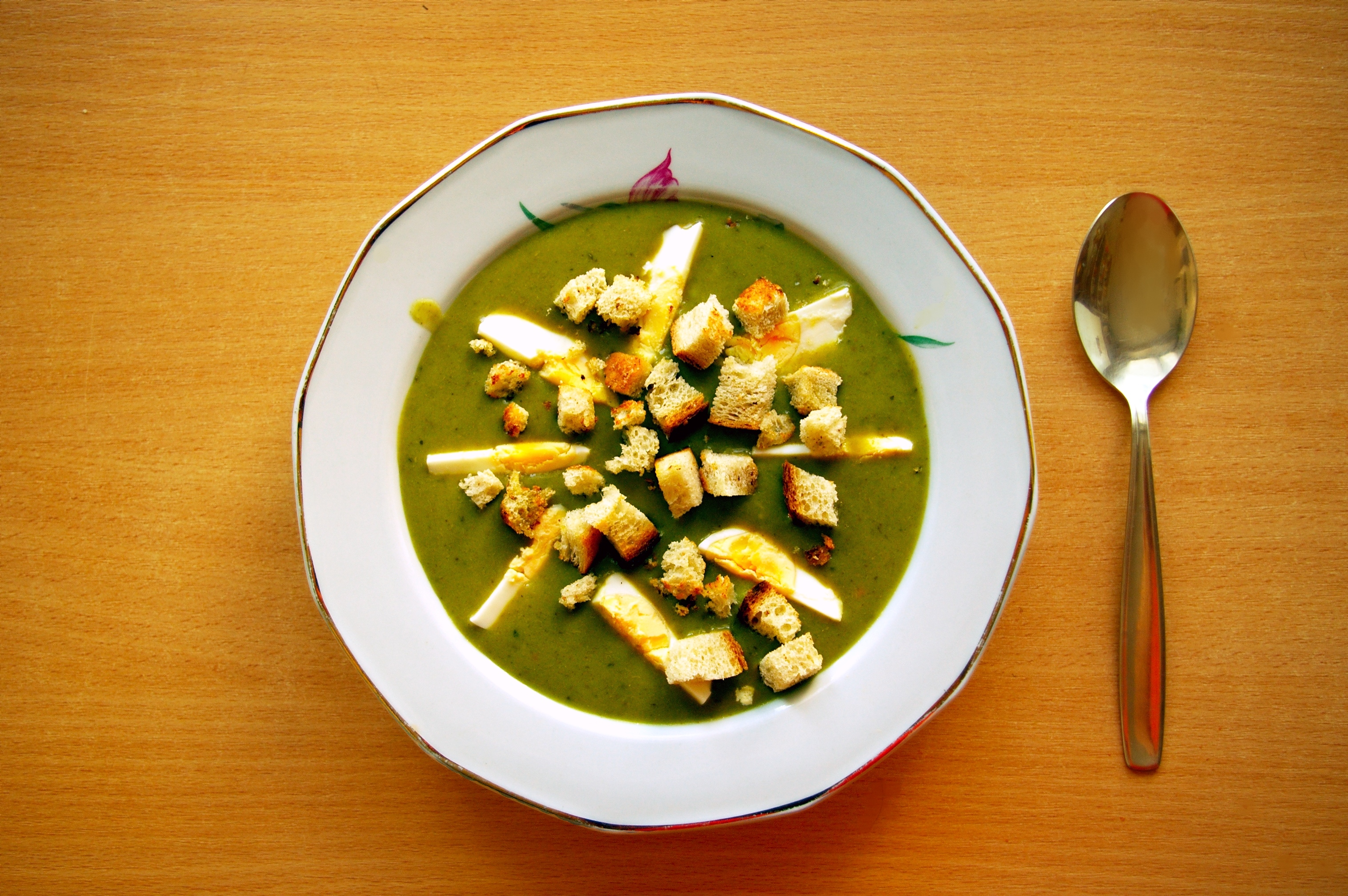
- Polish sorrel soup with egg and croutons
- Alternative names: Green borscht, green shchi, green soup
- Type: Soup
- Region or state: Eastern and Northeastern Europe
- Serving temperature: Hot or cold
- Main ingredients: Water or broth, sorrel leaves, and salt

Sorrel soup is made from water or broth, sorrel leaves, and salt. Varieties of the same soup include spinach, garden orache, chard, nettle, and occasionally dandelion, goutweed or ramsons, together with or instead of sorrel. It is known in Ashkenazi Jewish, Belarusian, Estonian, Hungarian, Latvian, Lithuanian, Romanian, Armenian, Georgian, Polish, Russian and Ukrainian cuisines. Its other English names, spelled variously schav, shchav, shav, or shtshav, are borrowed from the Yiddish language, which in turn derives from Slavic languages, like for example Belarusian шчаўе, Russian and Ukrainian щавель, shchavel, Polish szczaw. The soup name comes ultimately from the Proto-Slavic ščаvĭ for sorrel. Due to its commonness as a soup in Eastern European cuisines, it is often called green borscht, as a cousin of the standard, reddish-purple beetroot borscht. In Russia, where shchi (along with or rather than borscht) has been the staple soup, sorrel soup is also called green shchi. In old Russian cookbooks it was called simply green soup.

Sorrel soup usually includes further ingredients such as egg yolks or whole eggs (hard-boiled or scrambled), potatoes, carrots, parsley root, and rice. A variety of Ukrainian green borscht also includes beetroot. In Polish, Ukrainian, Belarusian, and Russian cuisines, sorrel soup may be prepared using any kind of broth instead of water. It is usually garnished with smetana, an Eastern European variety of sour cream. It may be served either hot or chilled.

Sorrel soup is characterized by its sour taste due to oxalic acid (called "sorrel acid" in Slavic languages) present in sorrel. The "sorrel-sour" taste may disappear when sour cream is added, as the oxalic acid reacts with calcium and casein. Some may refer to sorrel flavor as "tannic," as with spinach or walnuts.

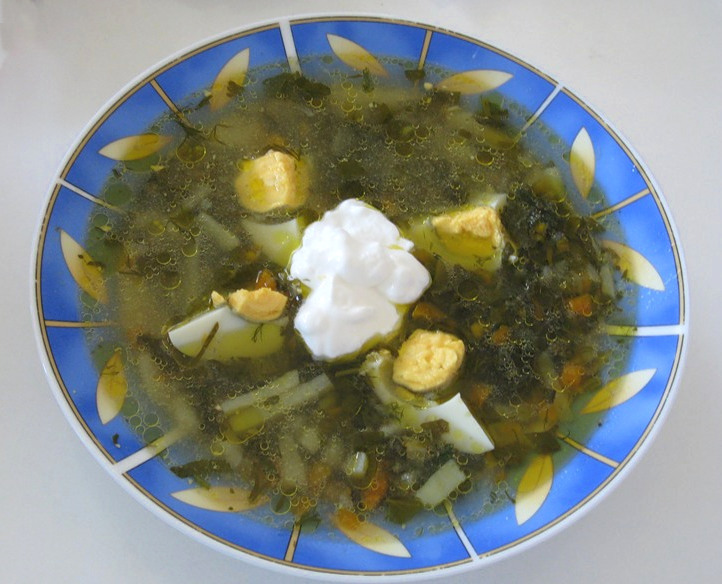
Green borscht with egg and sour cream

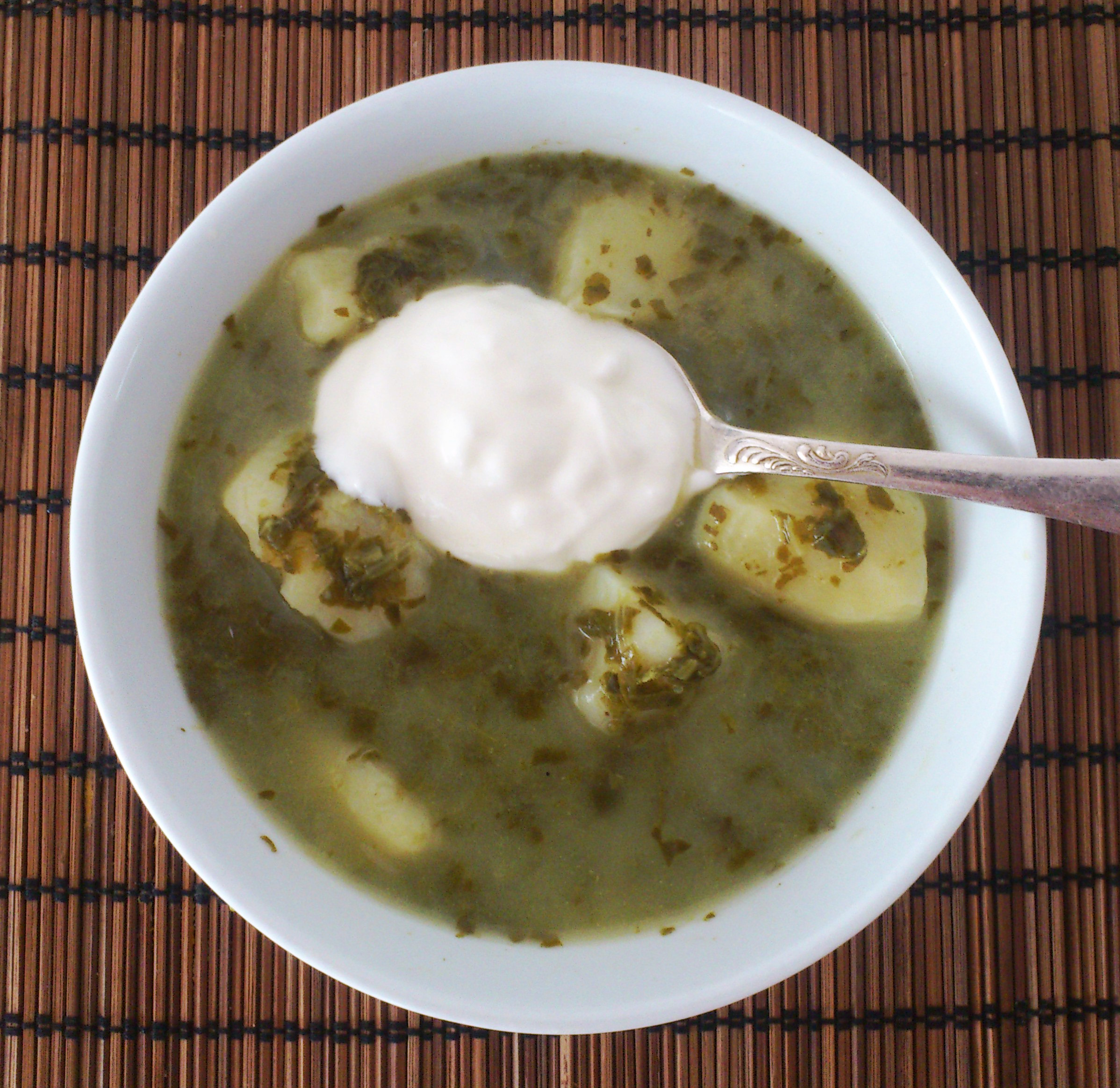
Green borscht made with spinach instead of sorrel and with potatoes

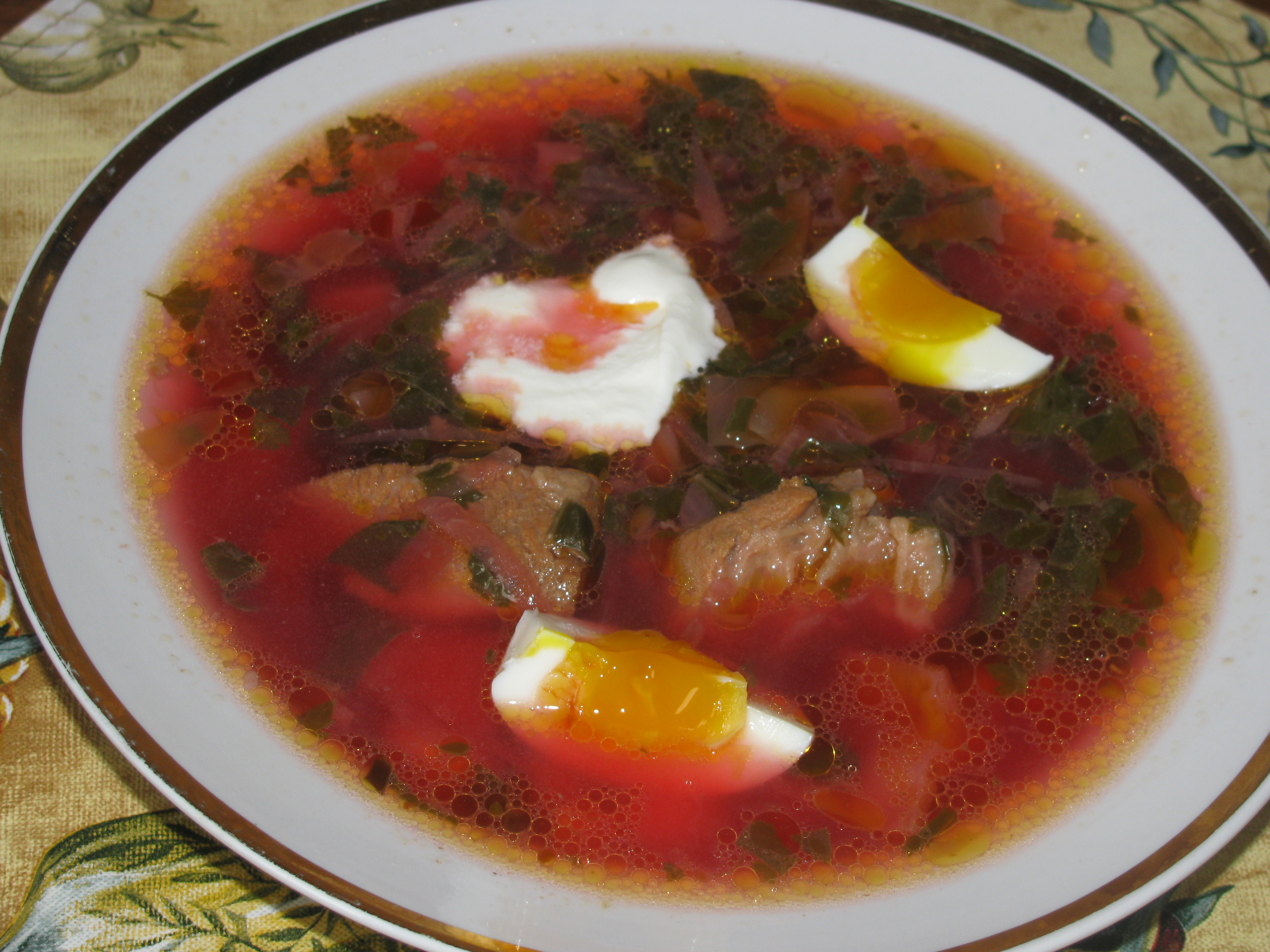
Ukrainian green borscht including both sorrel and beetroot

== See also ==
- Mulukhiyah
- Patriotic soup
- Spinach soup
- Watercress soup
- Cream of sorrel soup
