= Stockton cannery strike of 1937 =

Agricultural workers' strike in California

Coordinates: 37.986°N 121.248°W

- Date: April 23, 1937
- Location: Stockton, California
- Goals: Better pay and working conditions

Parties
Agricultural Workers Organization	California Processors and Growers

Number
850	700

Casualties
- Death: 1
- Injuries: 50+

The Stockton cannery strike of 1937, also known as the spinach riot, was the bloody culmination of conflict between the Agricultural Workers Organization local and the California Processors and Growers in the San Joaquin Valley of California. The riots of April 23, 1937, in which both sides were armed with clubs and firearms, began in front of a Stockton cannery and resulted in one death, over fifty serious injuries and tied up the movement of a $6 million vegetable crop. The strike is remembered as the most violent confrontation in a long struggle between unions and growers for control of Stockton canneries (and the millions of acres dependent on them) and the political, economic and labor ramifications that affected California for years to come.

== History ==
As the 1930s began, the social and economic turmoil created in the United States by the Great Depression on one hand and the Dust Bowl on the other, resulted in an estimated 1.3 million people migrating from the midwest and southwest of the country to California to seek better living conditions. At its peak in the fall of 1931, 1200-1500 migrants arrived each day, many of whom settled in the San Joaquin Valley agricultural area. The new influx of people, often living in designated work camps, found themselves competing not only with each other, but also with locals in an environment where unemployment was already as high as 25%. This intense competition and desperation for work led to a steep drop in agricultural wages and tolerance of deplorable working conditions.

The Agricultural Workers Organization, a subsidiary of the Industrial Workers of the World, as part of its continuing nationwide push to unionize agricultural workers, took up the workers' cause through the Local 20221 in San Joaquin County. Local 20221 was chartered through the American Federation of Labor in May 1936 and in March 1937 was authorized by the Stockton Central Labor Council to start organizing cannery workers, a move not sanctioned by the State Federation, but nevertheless undertook to head off both the International Longshoremen's Association which they considered too radical and their rival, the Congress of Industrial Organizations. This left a bitterly divided, partially organized, labor movement at odds with a militant business association, the California Producers and Growers, determined to block unionization at any cost. All parties viewed Stockton as the key battleground for control of California's multimillion-dollar agricultural industry.

In April 1937, the Agriculture Workers local and the workers at Stockton's five canneries demanded higher pay, better working conditions and a promise by the cannery owners to operate a "closed shop". The growers and cannery owners refused, countering that they had only recently given workers a 25% pay raise. Tensions mounted as the union threatened to strike at the opening of spinach season if its demands weren't met and the California Producers and Growers warned farmers that "Communist pickets will, by force, prevent" them from getting their crops to market.

== The riot ==
When their demands weren't met, the labor organizations called a strike. Cannery and farm workers were joined by longshoremen and other pro-union groups in picketing outside Stockton canneries. In anticipation of the strike, San Joaquin County Sheriff Harvey Odell had deputized 700 citizens and armed them with a truckload of pickaxes that he had ordered "with shaved down handles for easy swinging" from a local mill. Members of the posse were mostly local farmers and non-union cannery workers who viewed the interference of the unions as part of the wider communist activities associated with the first Red Scare.

The focal point of the riot was the Stockton Food Processors cannery on Waterloo Road where 200 posse members took up positions and tried to reopen the plant on the morning of April 23. About 25 non-union replacement workers managed to cross the hundreds-strong picket line before the first spinach truck, being escorted by California State Highway Patrol cars with sirens blaring, approached the cannery. 850 picketers surrounded the truck, disabled it, and began dumping the produce, prompting the state officers to fight back while Odell's men fired teargas bombs into the crowd. As yet more reinforcements from both sides began arriving, the picketers threw rocks and pulled deputies from vehicles and beat them with clubs. The deputies opened fire with shotguns at point blank range. The chaos continued with both sides attacking and retreating in successive waves for 3 hours until Odell decided to abandon the attempt to reopen the cannery and managers promised the union to stay closed and negotiate.

During the height of the melee, San Joaquin County District Attorney, Forsythe Charles Clowdsley, placed a call to the California Governor Frank F. Merriam to request National Guard troops to help quell the violence. On the advice of the Chief of the Highway Patrol, Raymond Cato, who had relayed the managers' decision to reopen talks, Governor Merriam declined the request.

== Results ==
The riot resulted in a "truce" mediated by Governor Merriam in Sacramento the following Saturday during which a tentative agreement was reached between the labor representatives and the California Processors and Growers regarding wage increases and union recognition. Stockton's canneries were reopened April 28, 1937. Despite the concessions made by the canneries and the apparent labor victory, the agricultural and cannery workers in Stockton remained largely divided and unorganized due to differing opinions regarding the tactics of the strike and merits of the final agreement.

== See also ==
- Spinach in the United States
- Strikes in the United States in the 1930s
