= Watercress soup =

Soup

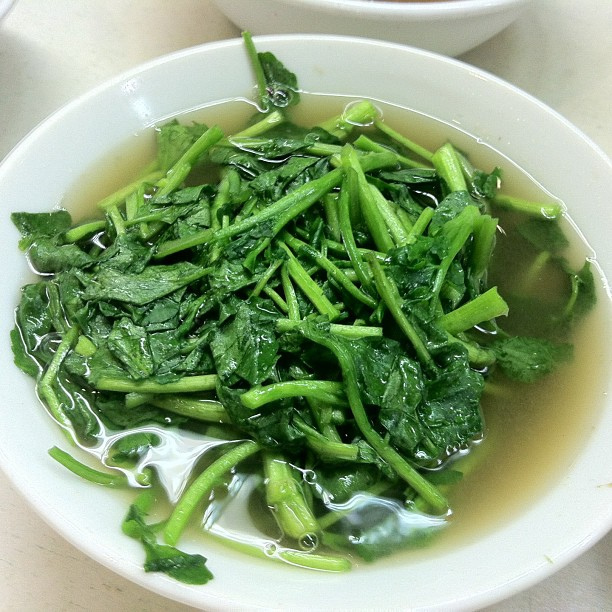
A simple watercress soup

Watercress soup is a soup prepared using the leaf vegetable watercress as a primary ingredient.

== Description and preparation ==
Watercress soup may be prepared as a cream soup or as a broth/stock-based soup using vegetable or chicken stock. Additional ingredients used can include vegetables such as potato, leeks, spinach, celery and turnips, cheese, butter, lemon juice, salt and pepper. The soup may be prepared as a purée of its ingredients in a food processor. It can be served hot or cold, and may be garnished with crème fraîche, shaved Parmesan cheese, drizzled olive oil and watercress leaves.

== Gallery ==
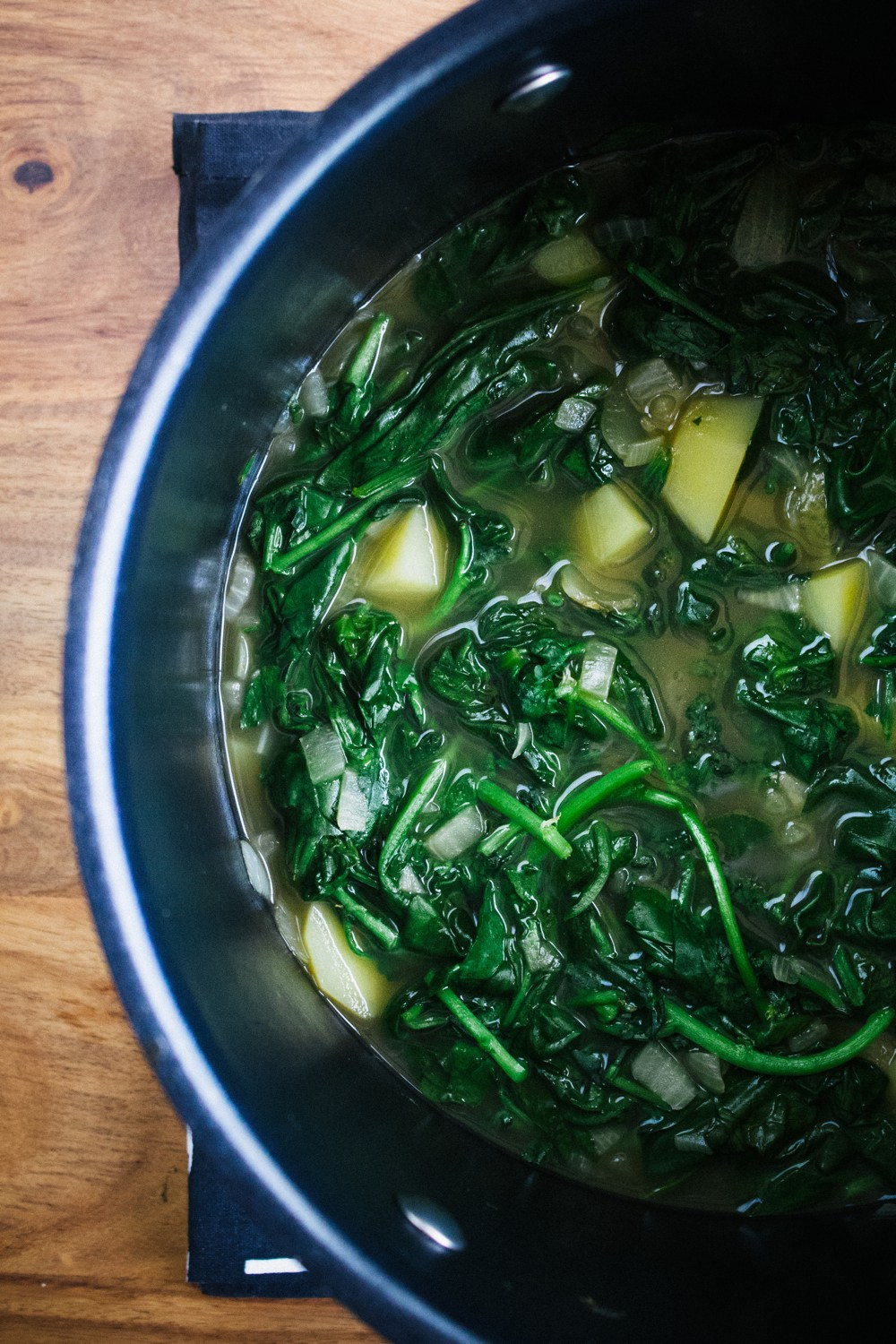
Watercress and spinach soup

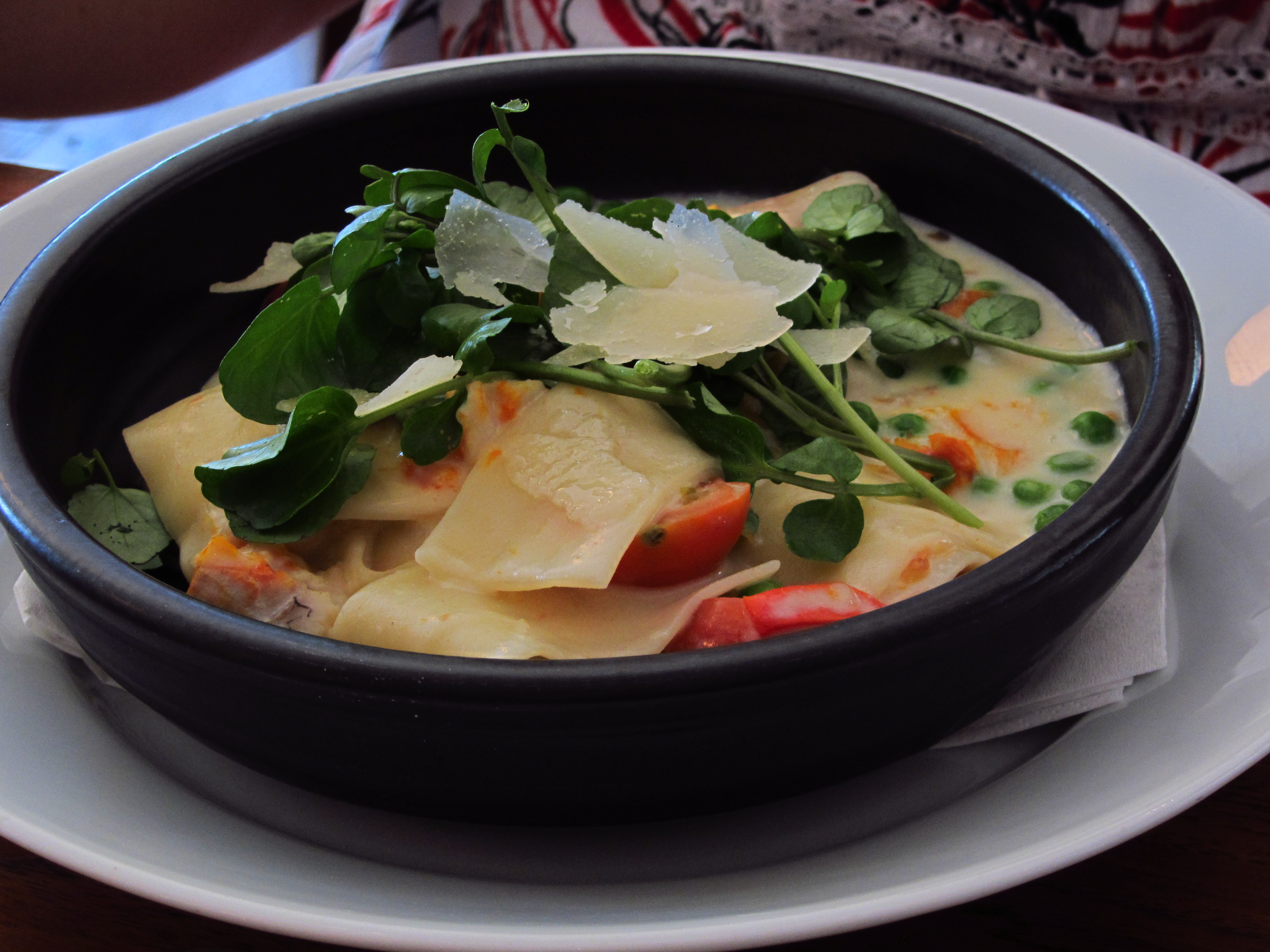
Potato and watercress soup with shaved cheese, tomato and peas

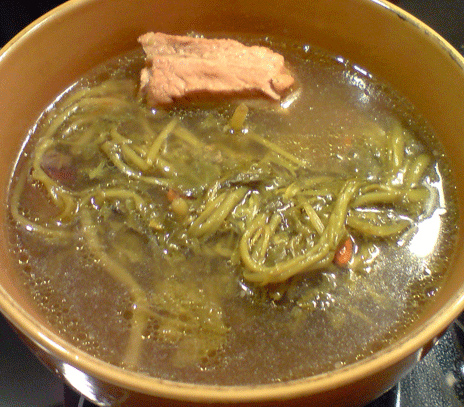
Homemade watercress soup

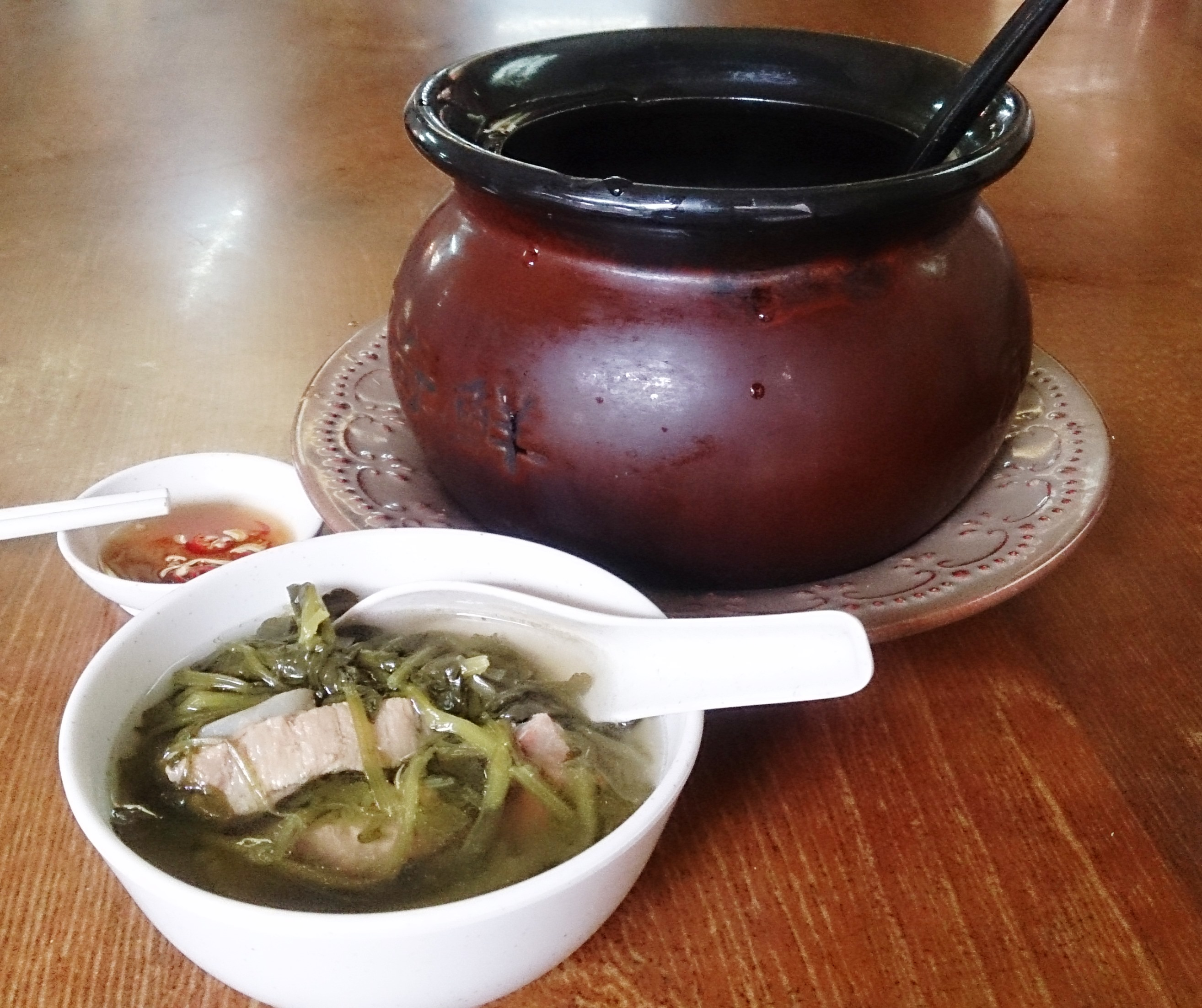
Watercress soup

== See also ==
- Cabbage soup
- List of soups
- Spinach soup
- Vegetable soup
- List of vegetable soups
