= Spinach soup =

Soup prepared using spinach

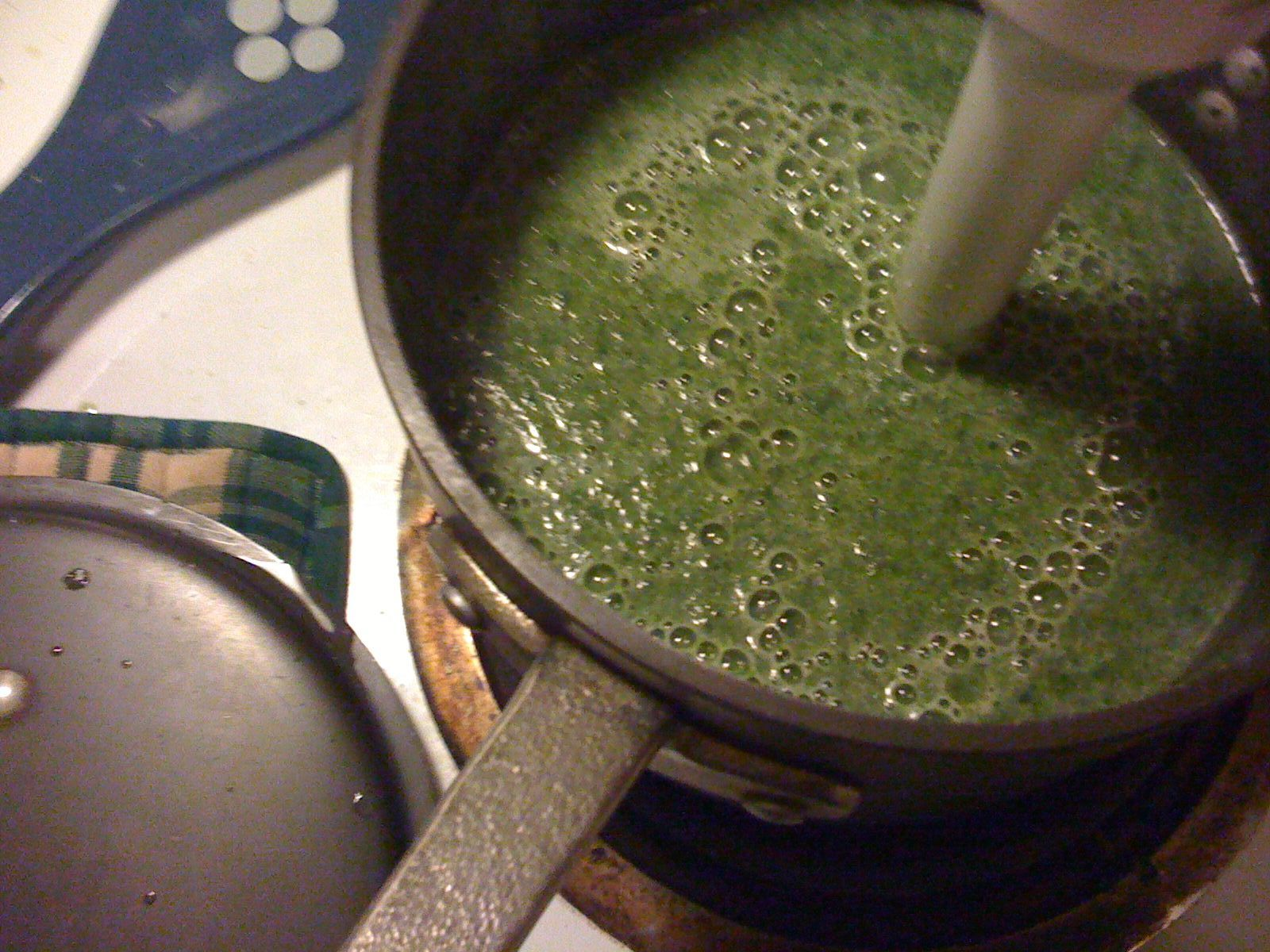
- Cream of spinach soup
- Type: Soup
- Serving temperature: Hot or cold
- Main ingredients: Spinach
- Ingredients generally used: Onion, green onion, carrot, celery, tomatoes, potatoes, lemon juice, olive oil, seasonings, salt and pepper

Spinach soup is a soup prepared using spinach as a primary ingredient. A common dish around the world, the soup can be prepared as a broth-based or cream-based soup, and the latter can be referred to as "cream of spinach soup." In China, a spinach and tofu soup is also known as "emerald and white jade soup"; spinach and tofu represent emerald and white jade respectively, and thus the spinach soup itself can be called "emerald soup". Fresh, canned or frozen spinach can be used, and the spinach can be used whole, puréed or chopped. Additional ingredients can include onion, green onion, carrot, celery, tomatoes, potatoes, lemon juice, olive oil, seasonings, salt and pepper. Spinach soup is typically served hot, but can also be served as a cold soup. Prior to being served, it can be topped or garnished with ingredients such as sour cream and crème fraîche.

== Gallery ==
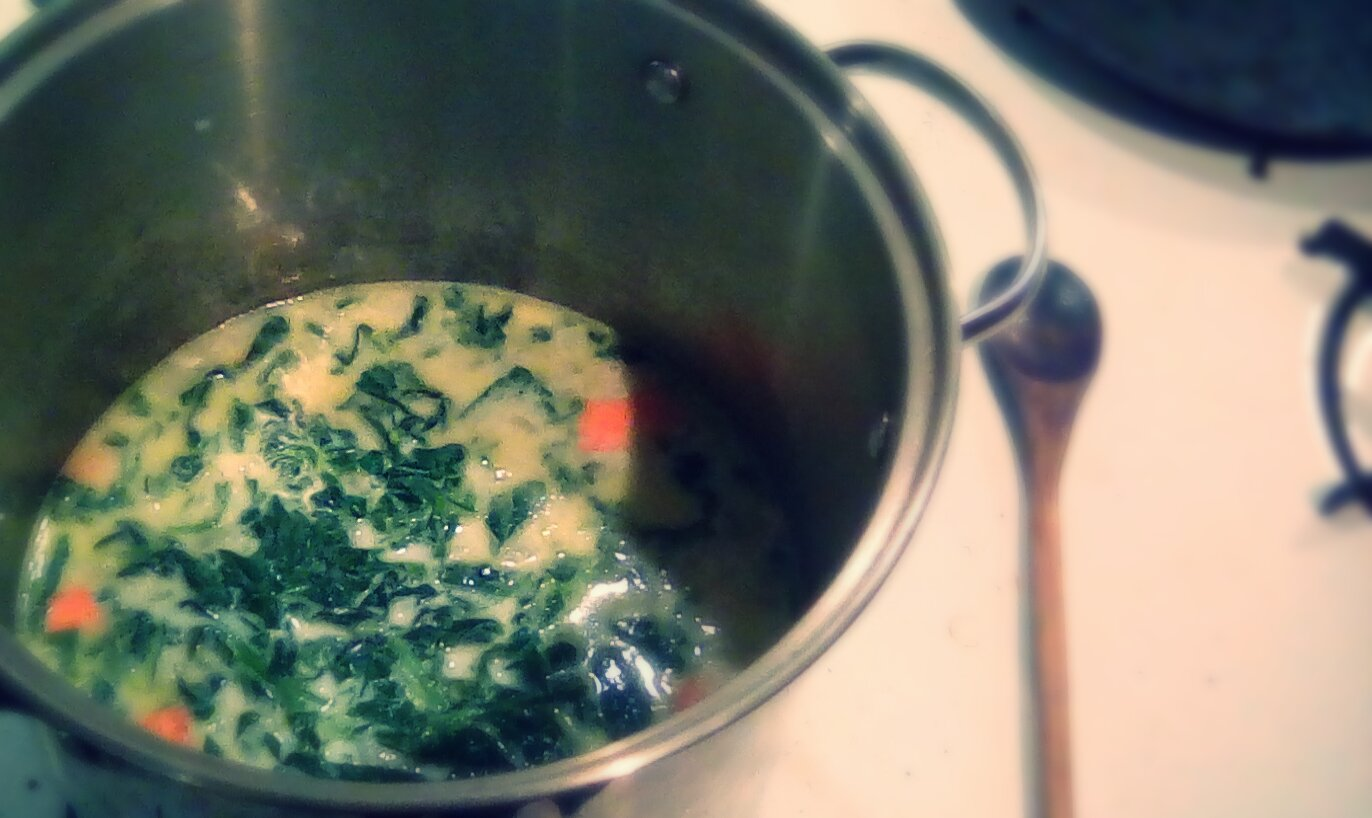
Cream of spinach soup being cooked

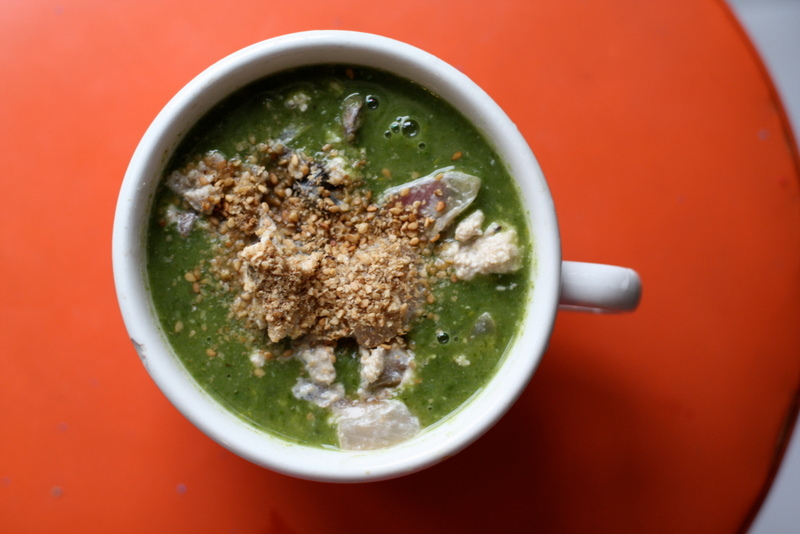
Spinach soup with garnishes

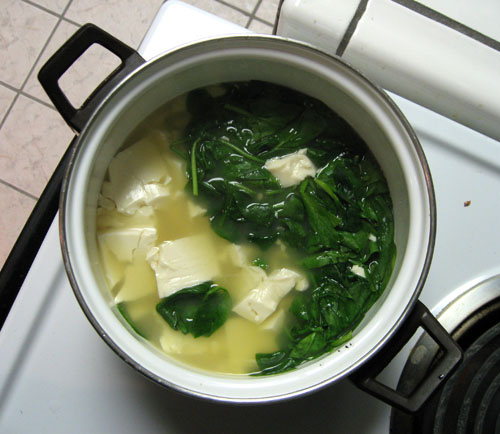
Spinach soup with tofu

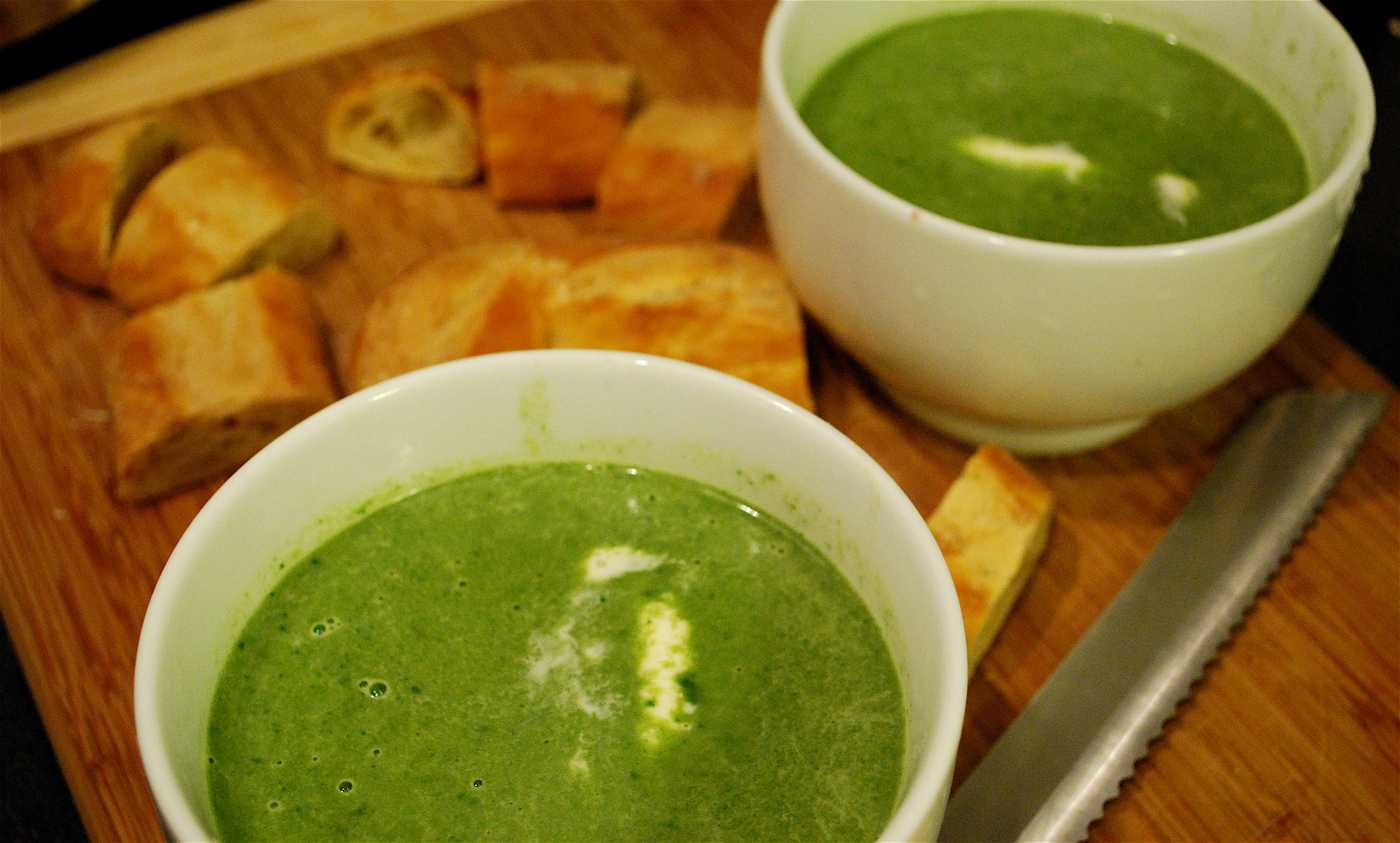
Green garlic and spinach soup, topped with crème fraîche

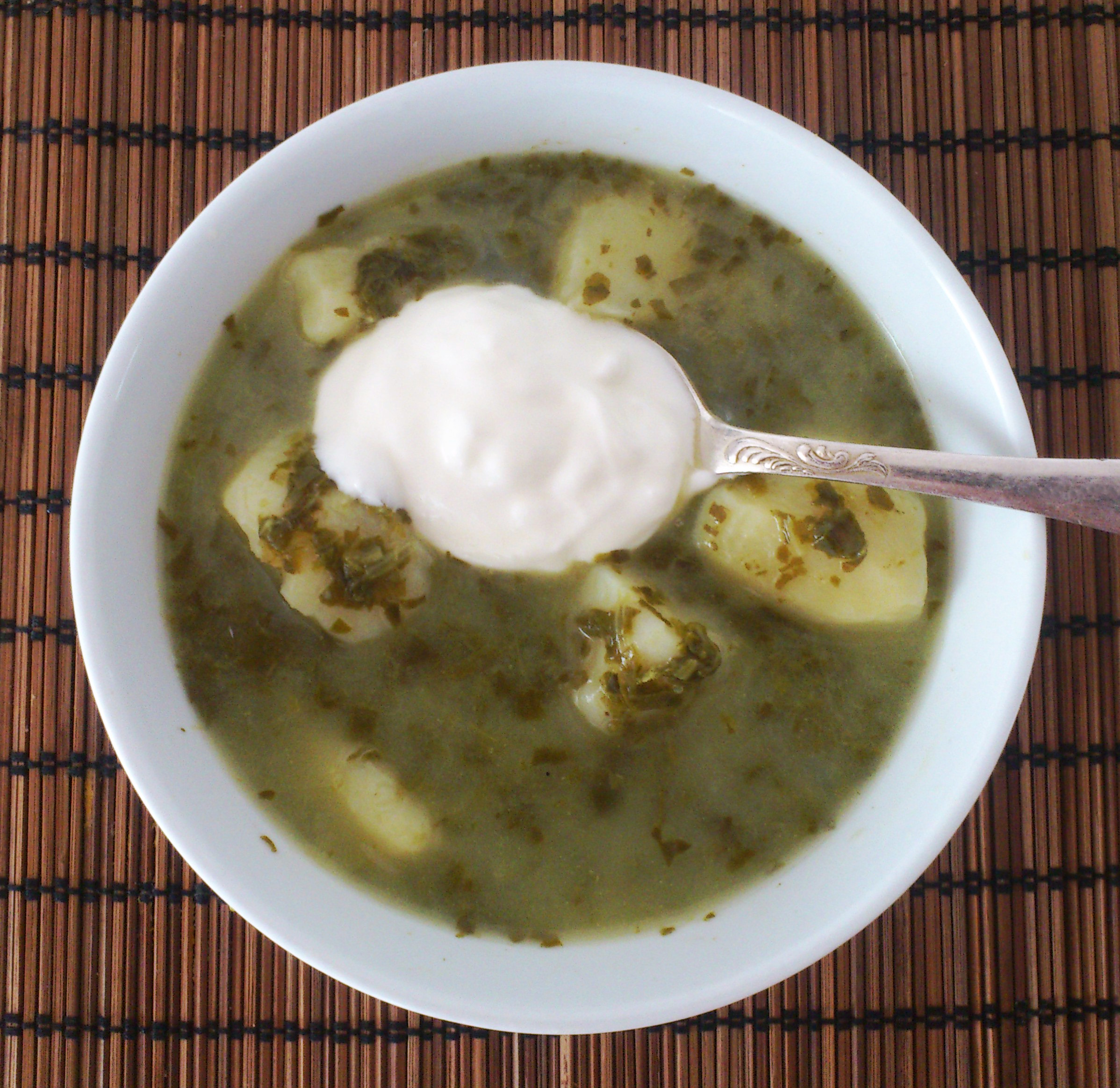
Green borscht with spinach and potatoes, topped with smetana

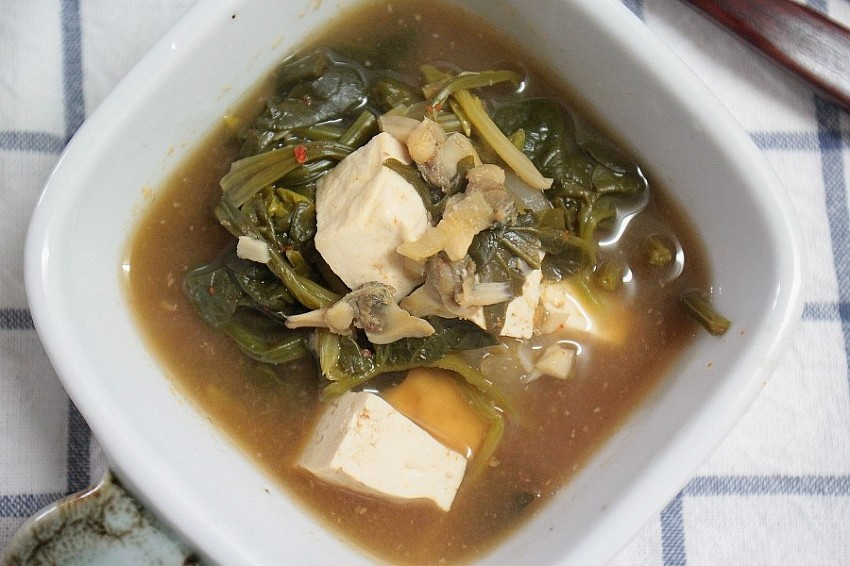
Sigeumchi-doenjang-guk (spinach soybean paste soup)

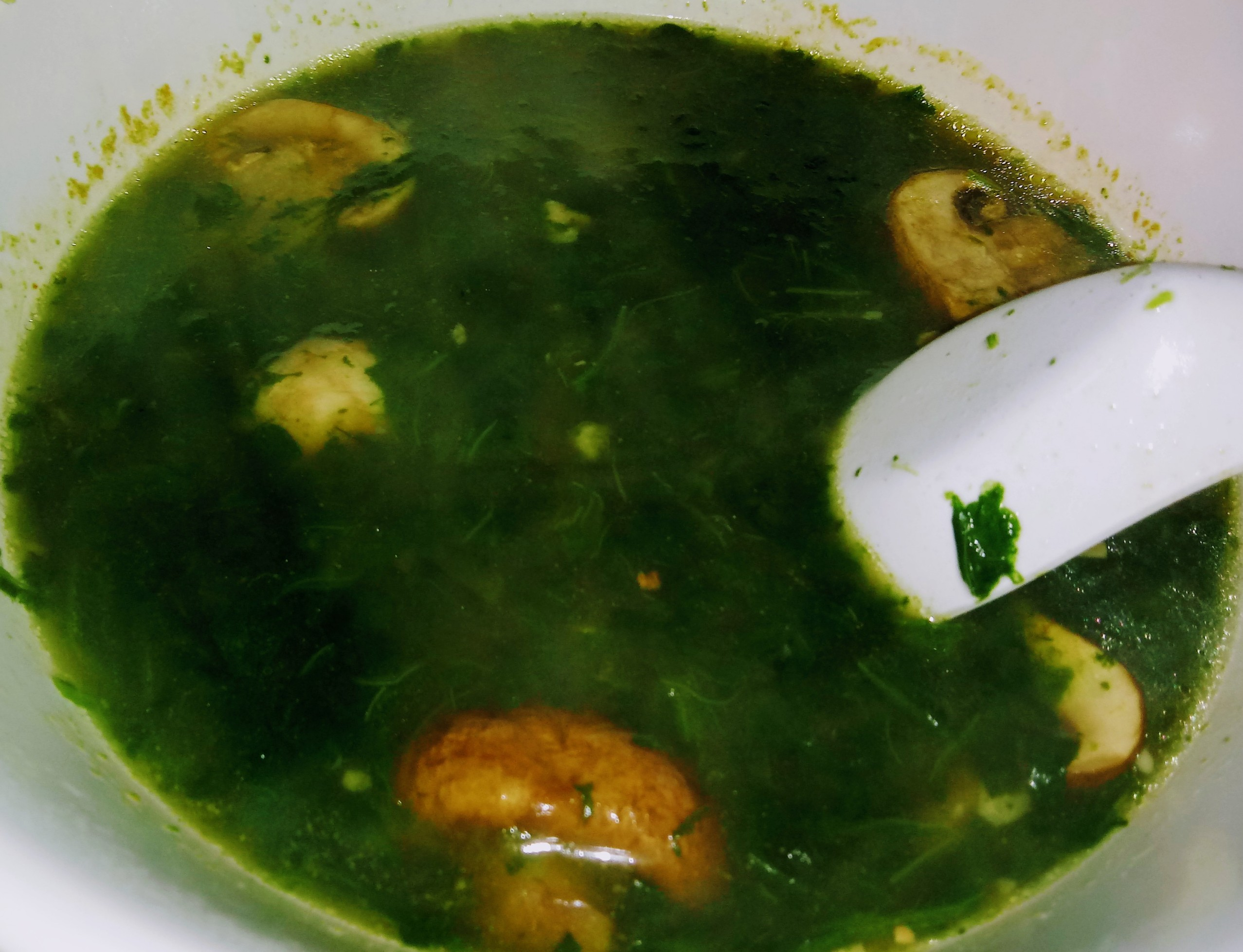
Song dynasty's (China) patriotic soup (spinach version)

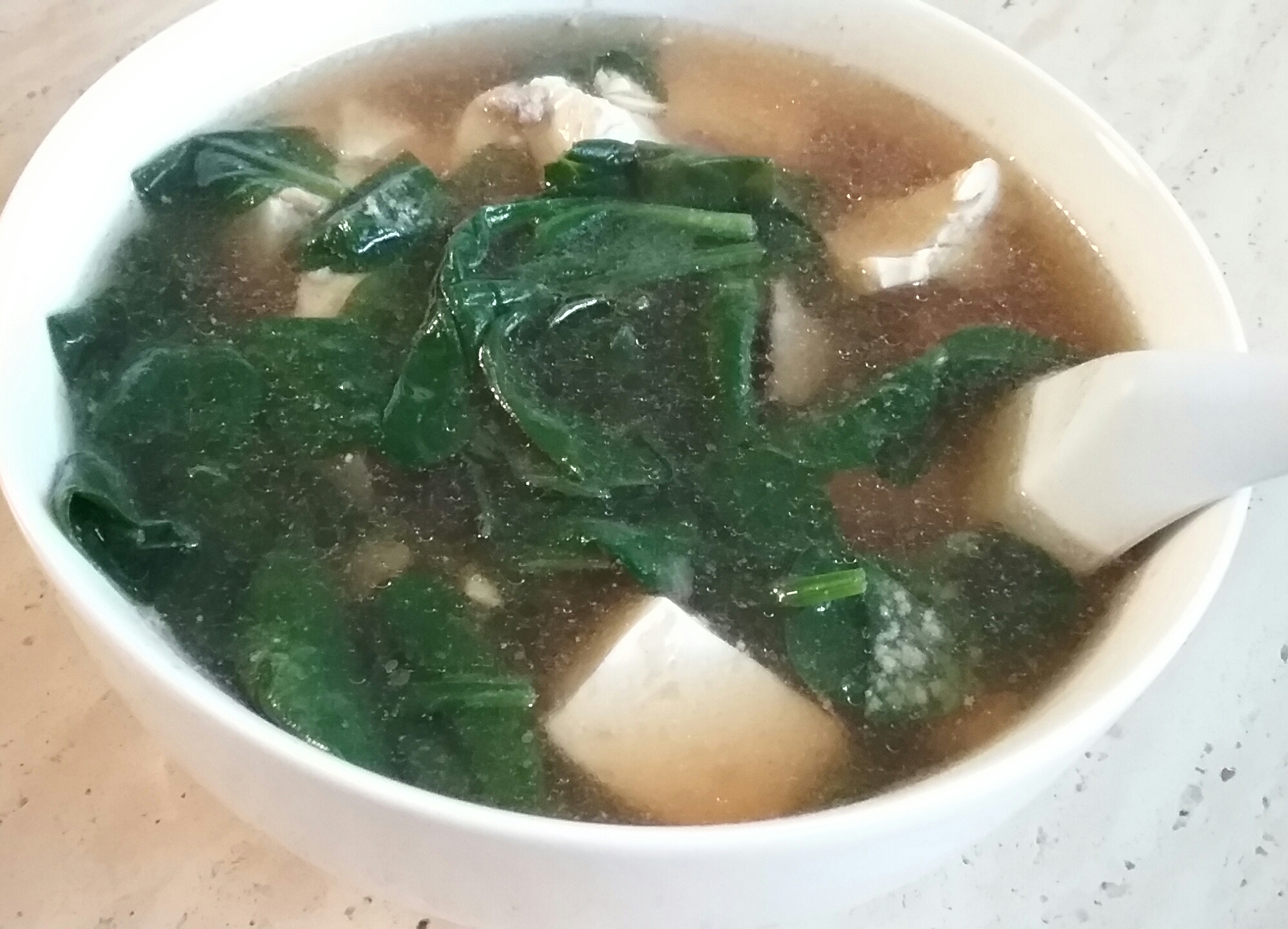
A bowl of Chinese style spinach and tofu soup, typically referred as "emerald and white jade soup"

== See also ==
- Cabbage soup
- List of cream soups
- List of vegetable soups
- List of soups
- Patriotic soup
- Sorrel soup
- Spinach dip
- Spinach salad
- Vegetable soup
- Watercress soup
