= Spinach salad =

Salad of green leaves

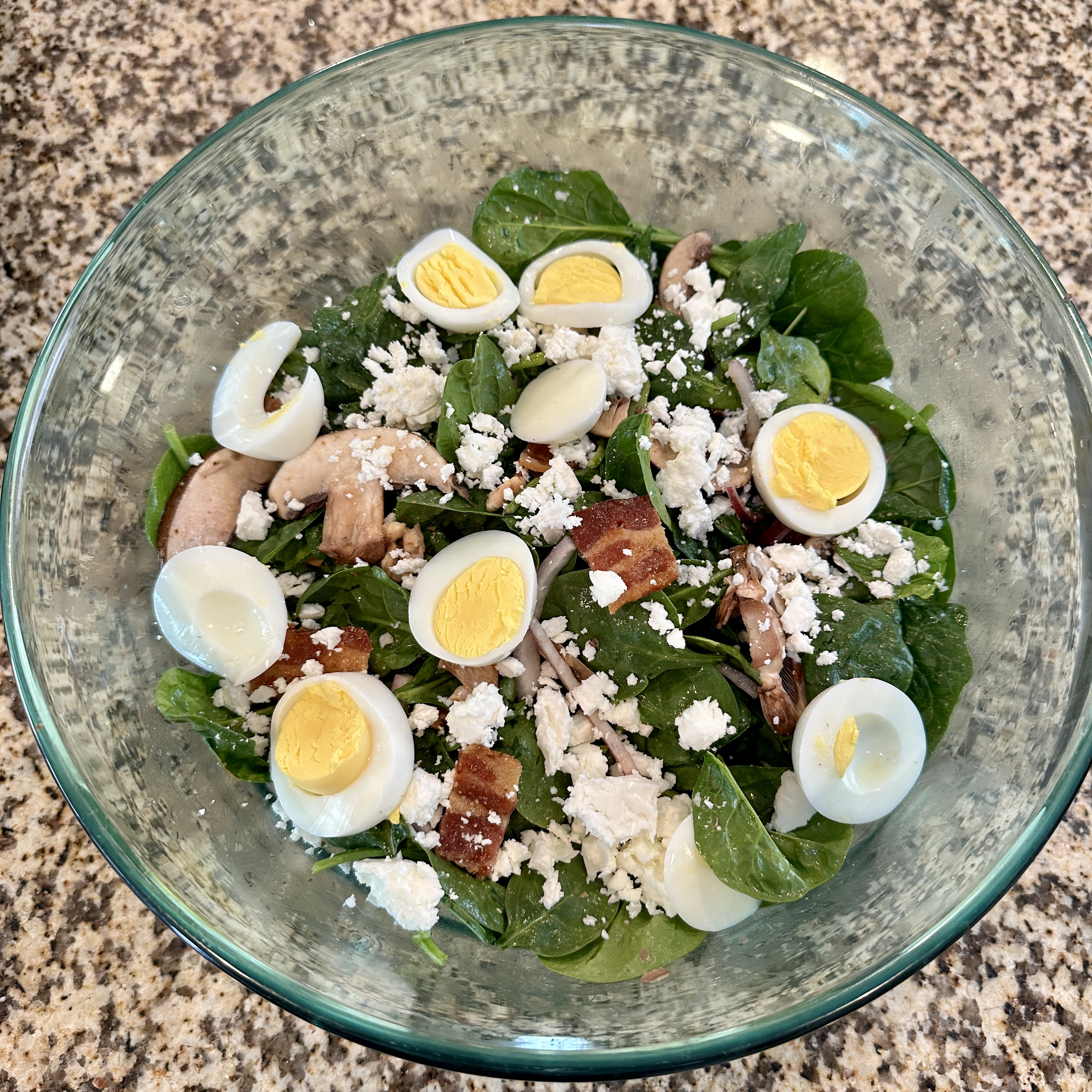
- Classic spinach salad
- Type: Salad
- Course: Main dish or side dish
- Serving temperature: Room temperature or warm
- Main ingredients: Spinach

Spinach salad is a salad with spinach as its main ingredient. In the US, a version dressed in a hot bacon dressing which slightly wilts the spinach was popular in the 1970s and into the 1980s and has been called the classic version.

Versions exist in Persian, Georgian, and Chinese cuisines, and a US version in the early 1900s used cooked spinach in a molded salad.

== Ingredients, preparation and serving ==
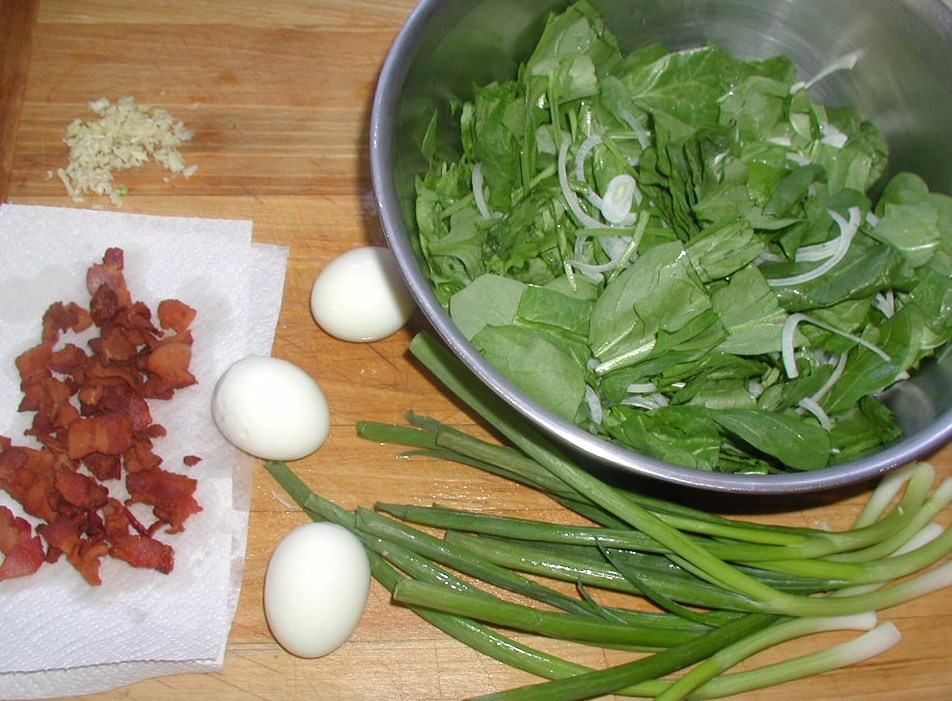
Washed spinach, fried bacon, eggs, and scallions are set out to make a spinach salad.

Common additional ingredients include tomatoes, eggs, cheese, slivered almonds, walnuts and/or fresh or dried berries, such as cranberry or strawberry. Spinach salad and its various recipes is possibly one of the favorite salads for many. Spinach salad is classically served with a warm bacon or vinaigrette dressing, but variations are endless.

The salad can be served as a main dish or a side dish. The classic version with hot bacon dressing is typically served warm; it was developed with mature spinach as the main ingredients, but as baby spinach became available in supermarkets it became more widely used in the dish. A 1983 New York Times recipe by Florence Fabricant using mature spinach called for the spinach to be washed, dried, and torn into pieces before dressing.

== Popularity ==
Spinach salad's popularity likely arose because spinach is one of the earliest of salad greens to emerge in the spring in temperate climates. Before long-distance shipping of refrigerated produce became common, those living in climates where leafy greens were not available year around eagerly anticipated the appearance of perishable early greens such as spinach and asparagus. Spinach emerges before dandelion greens, which were a traditional European early-spring salad green also often dressed with a hot bacon dressing, particularly in Germany. The New York Times' Melissa Clark noted that the appearance of baby spinach in supermarkets, eliminating the need for time-consuming rinsing, de-stemming, and chopping of the mature leaves, increased her willingness to treat the dish as a weeknight dinner option.

Saveur, Southern Living, The New York Times, and TheKitchn called the hot-bacon-dressed spinach salad a classic.

== Variations ==
Spanakit is a spinach salad with Persian origins; its name refers to the Persian word aspanakh, or spinach. According to Joan Nathan it is "a very old recipe". The dish contains ground spinach and ground nuts.

In Dongbei, China, a salad of blanched spinach and peanuts is common and traditionally served as an appetizer.

Ispanakhi Matsvnit is a Georgian salad of cooked and minced spinach mixed with yoghurt.

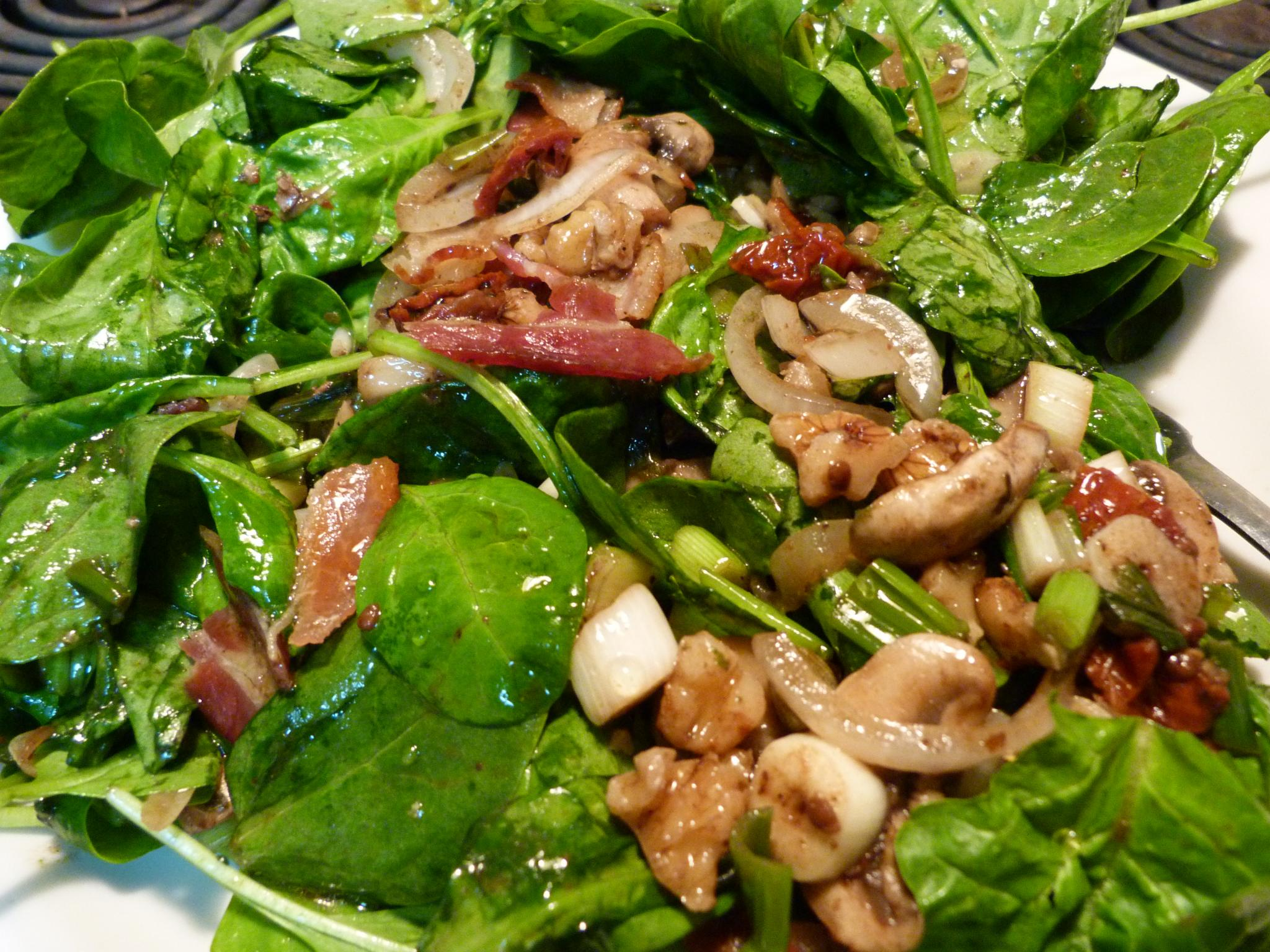
Wilted spinach salad

According to Alton Brown, a spinach salad dressed in warm bacon dressing likely originated among the Pennsylvania Dutch. Variations of the salad with a hot bacon dressing, also called wilted spinach salad, became popular in the 1970s in the United States and often included canned mandarin oranges, blue cheese and hard-boiled eggs. The spinach salad with hot bacon dressing remained popular into the 1980s but by the early 2000s had fallen out of style; according to Wolfgang Puck writing in 2010, "You practically have to send out a search party to find one in fine restaurants these days." Puck speculated that the salad had become so ubiquitous that "people burned out on it".

== History ==
Recipes for spinach salad at the start of the 20th century were quite different from modern versions; rather than a fresh salad the dish was a molded salad made from cooked spinach.

== See also ==
- Spinach soup
- List of salads
