= Vegetable soup =

Type of soup containing vegetables

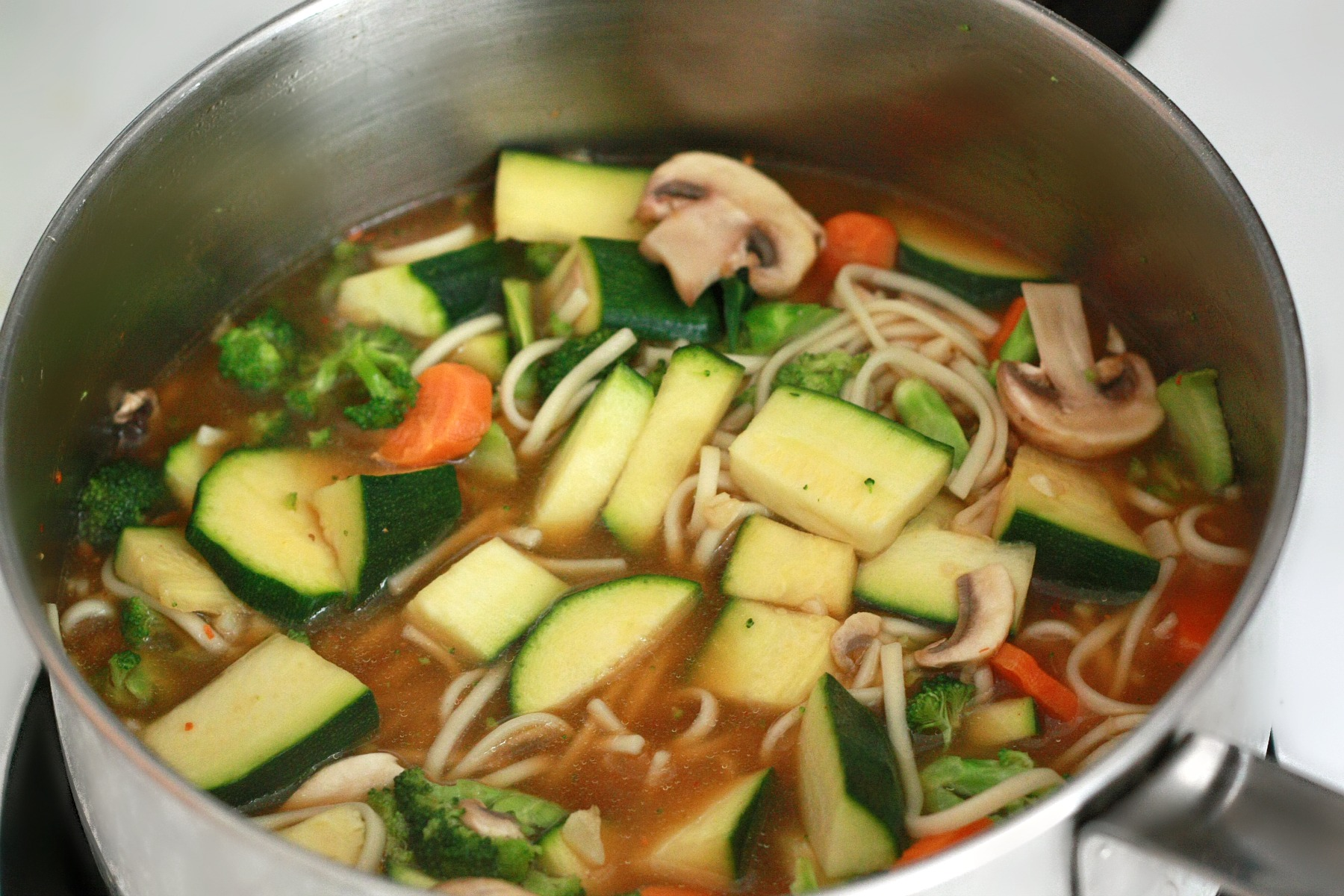
A vegetable soup that includes udon noodles

Vegetable soup is a common soup prepared using vegetables (including leaf vegetables, and sometimes loosely mushrooms) as primary ingredients. It dates to ancient history, and in modern times is also a mass-produced food product.

== Overview ==
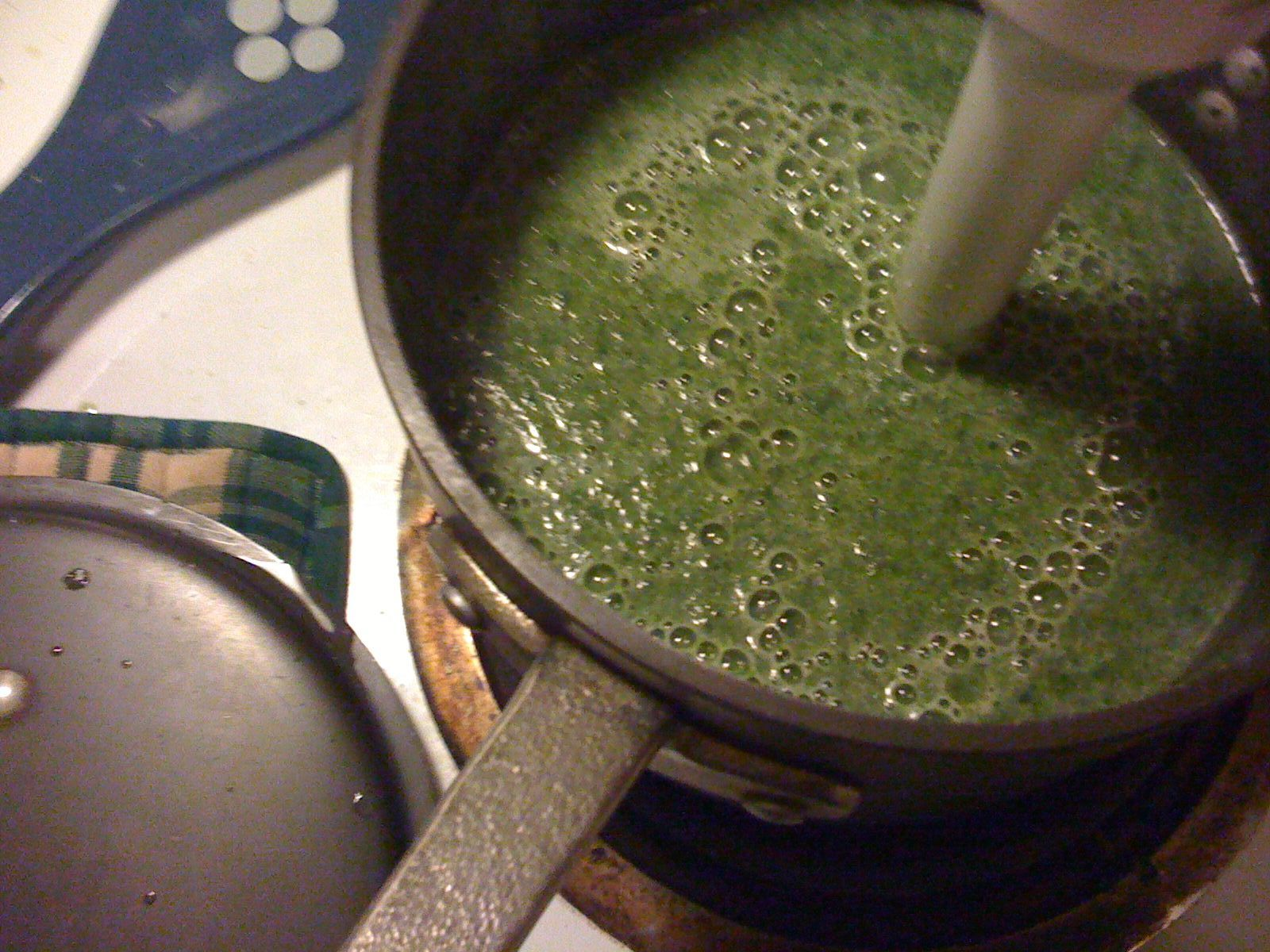
Cream of spinach soup

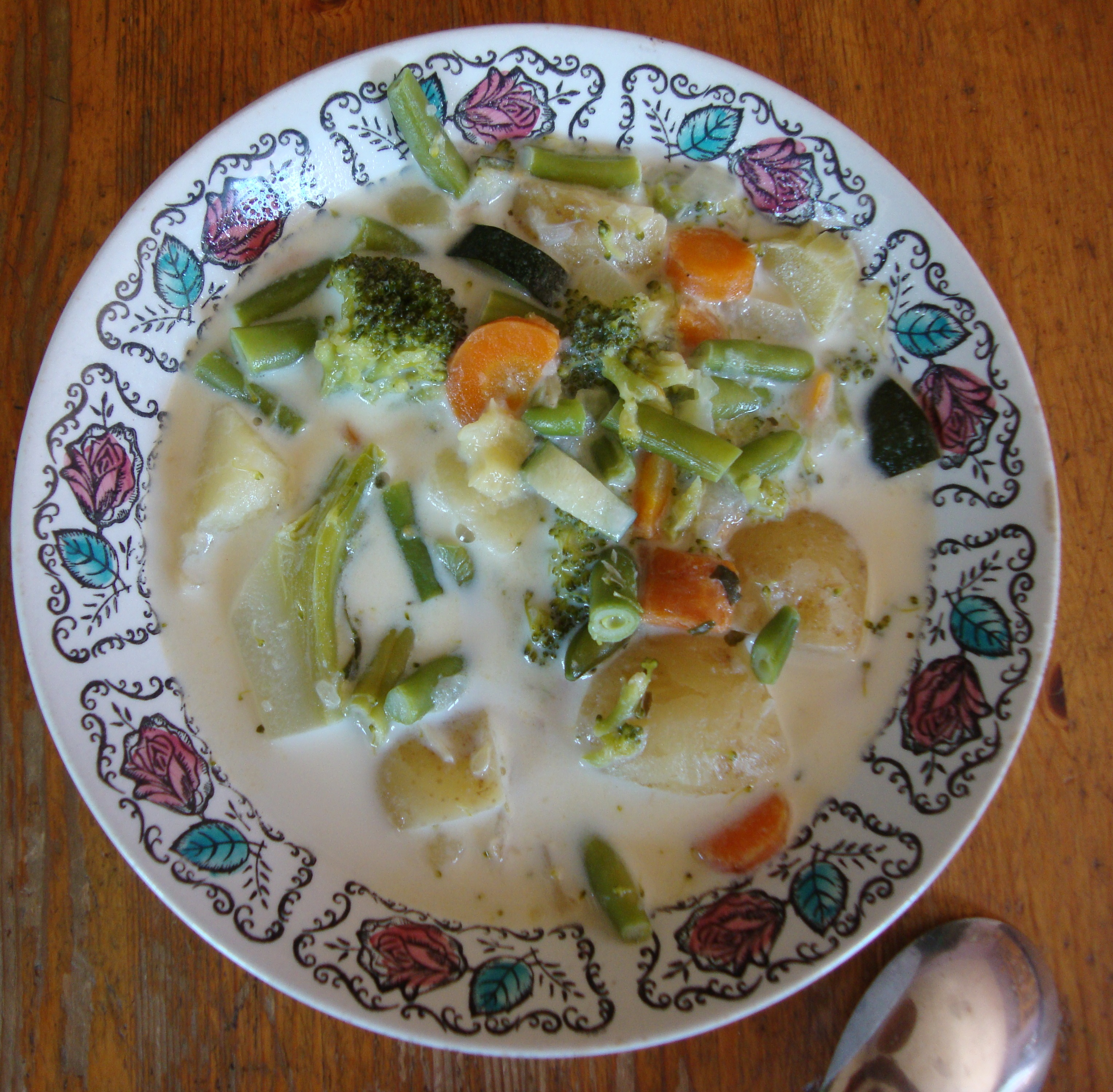
Kesäkeitto, a Finnish vegetable soup with boiled potatoes and vegetables in a small amount of water, milk and butter

Vegetable soup is prepared using vegetables, leafy greens, mushrooms, and roots as the main ingredients. Vegetable soup can be prepared as a stock- or cream-based soup. Basic ingredients in addition to vegetables can include beef, fish, beans and legumes, grains, tofu, noodles and pasta, vegetable broth or stock, milk, cream, water, olive or vegetable oil, seasonings, salt and pepper, among others. Some vegetable soups are pureed and run through a sieve, straining them to create a smooth texture. It is typically served hot, although some, such as gazpacho, are typically served cold. Vegetable soup is sometimes served as a starter or appetizer dish.

Vegetable soup is mass-produced in canned, frozen, dried, powdered, and instant varieties.

== History ==
Vegetable soup dates to ancient history. A 5th-century Roman cookbook included a recipe for "a forerunner of onion soup." Broth is mentioned by approximately the year 1000 and potage by the 1400s. Clifford Wright has stated that cabbage soup was important in medieval Italian cuisine.

In central Appalachia, vegetable soup, also referred to as winter vegetable soup and country soup, is a traditional staple food and common dish during the months of December–February among Appalachian highlanders.

== See also ==
- List of ancient dishes
- List of soups
- List of vegetable dishes
- List of vegetable soups
