= Bourride =

Meal based on fish and seafood, variant of bouillabaisse

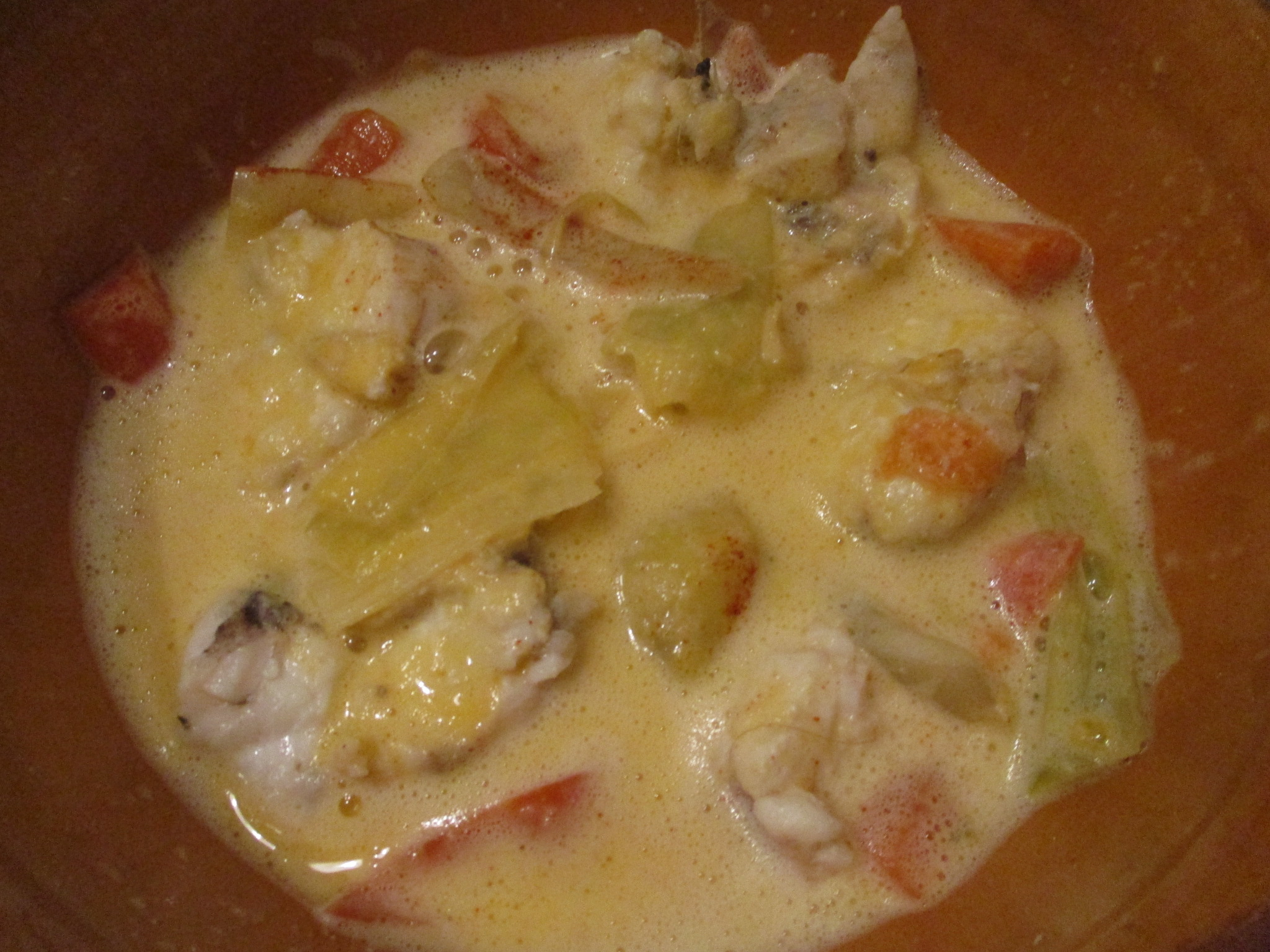
- Bourride à la sétoise with monkfish
- Course: Entrée or main dish
- Region or state: Provence et Languedoc
- Serving temperature: hot
- Main ingredients: fish, seafood, and vegetables, aïoli and olive oil
- Variations: Bourride à la sétoise, bouillabaisse, aïoli garni, soupe de poissons à la sétoise, fish ragoût

Bourride (bourrido, in provençal, borrida, in occitan) is a culinary speciality traditional to the cuisine of Provence and Languedoc, based on fish, seafood, and vegetables, served with aïoli and olive oil. A variant of bouillabaisse or fish soup à la Sétoise, this fish soup, originally from Provence and Languedoc, is particularly popular in Toulon (Var) and Agde (Hérault).

The word bourride comes from provençal bourrido (borrida in classical norm of occitan language), which was derived from bouri/bouli (borit/bolit), boiled, in english.

== Ingredients ==
This recipe is prepared with white fish or Mediterranean seafood, such as mullet, mackerel, sea bass, whiting, conger eel, sea robin, sea bream, cod, turbot, le poisson de St Pierre, or monkfish (for bourride à la Sétoise), a brunoise of vegetables (celery, fennel, leeks, carrots, onions, bouquet garni, possibly with white wine), and aïoli.

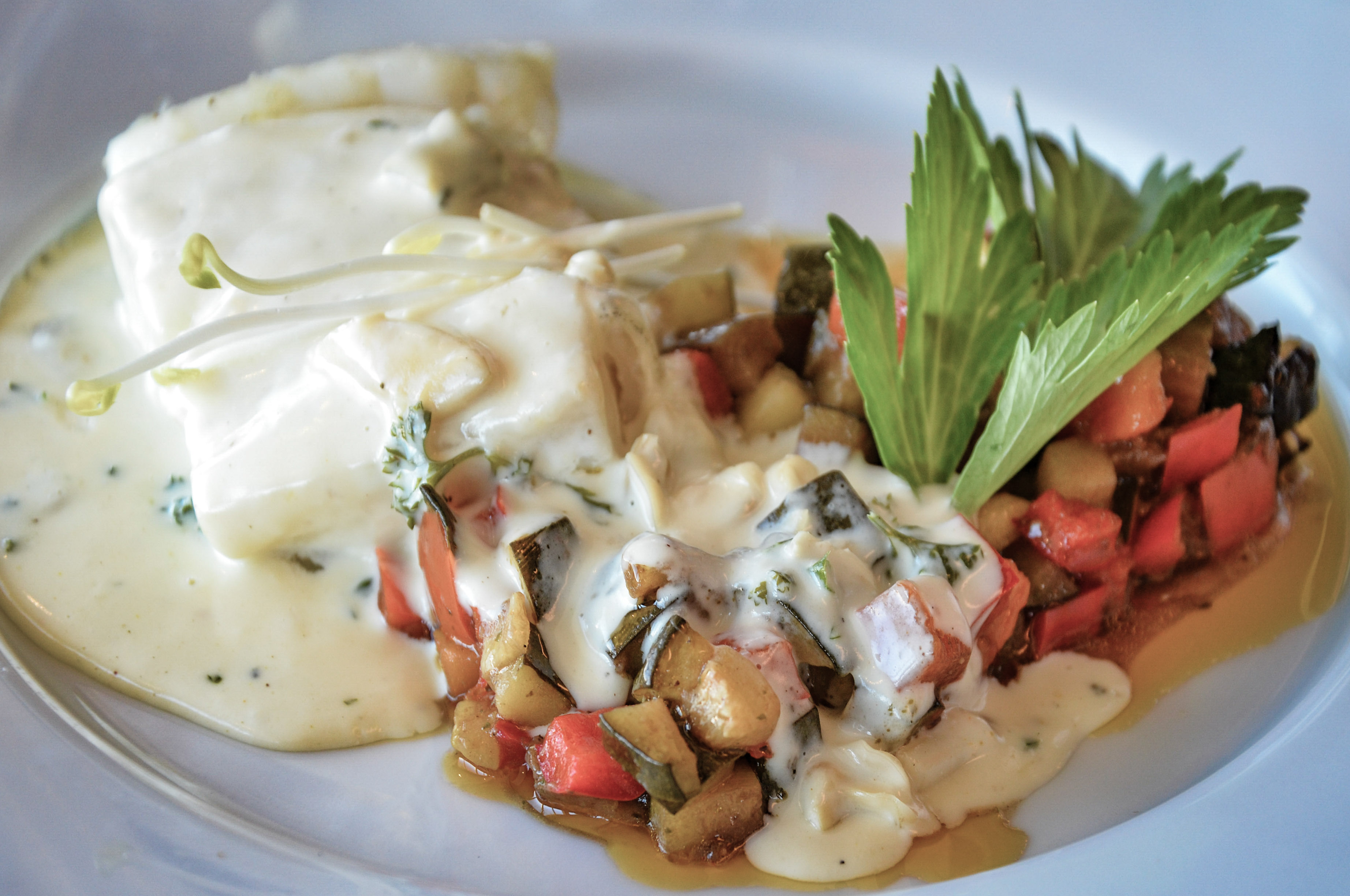
With ratatouille

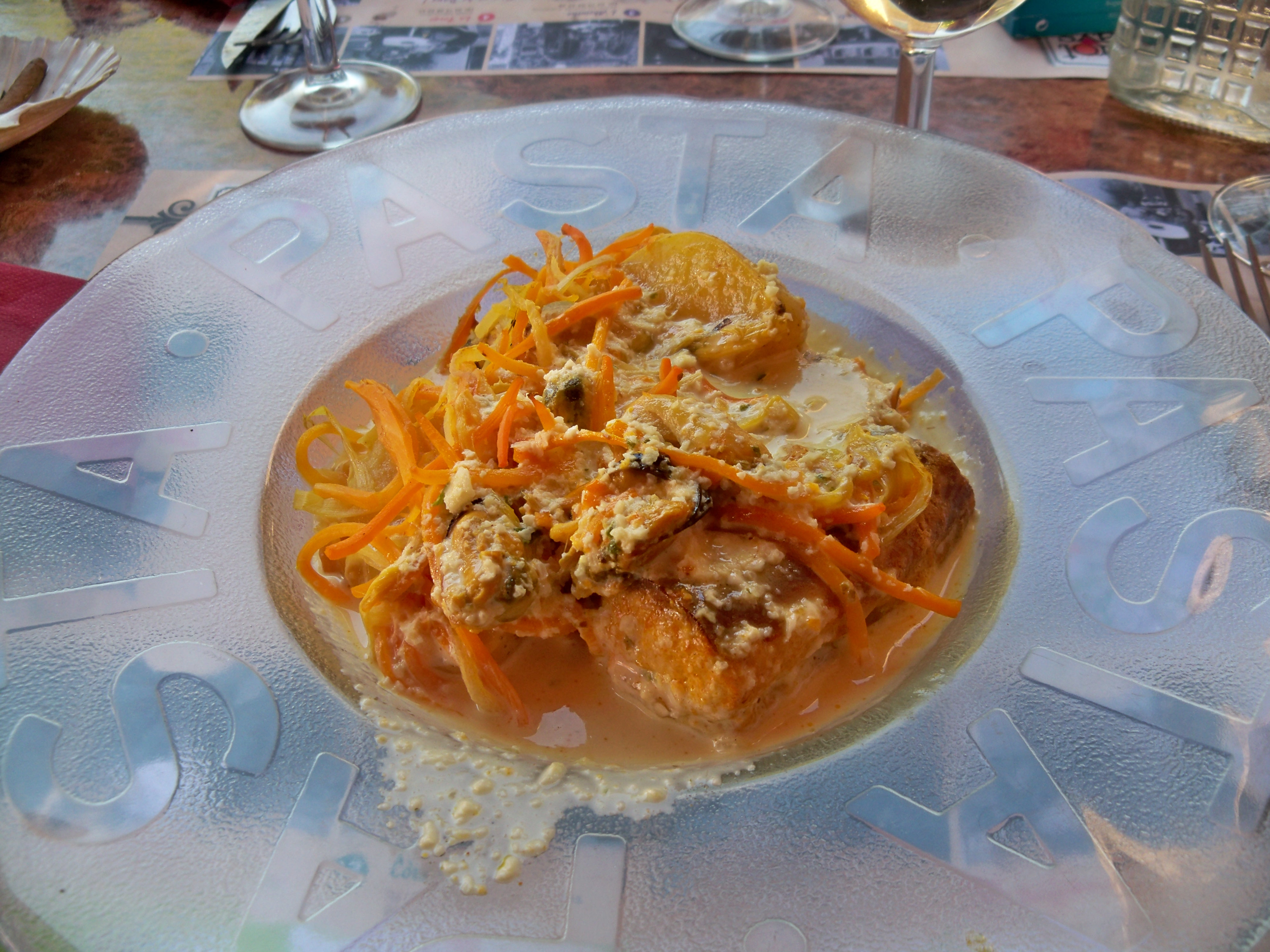
Bourride with seafood

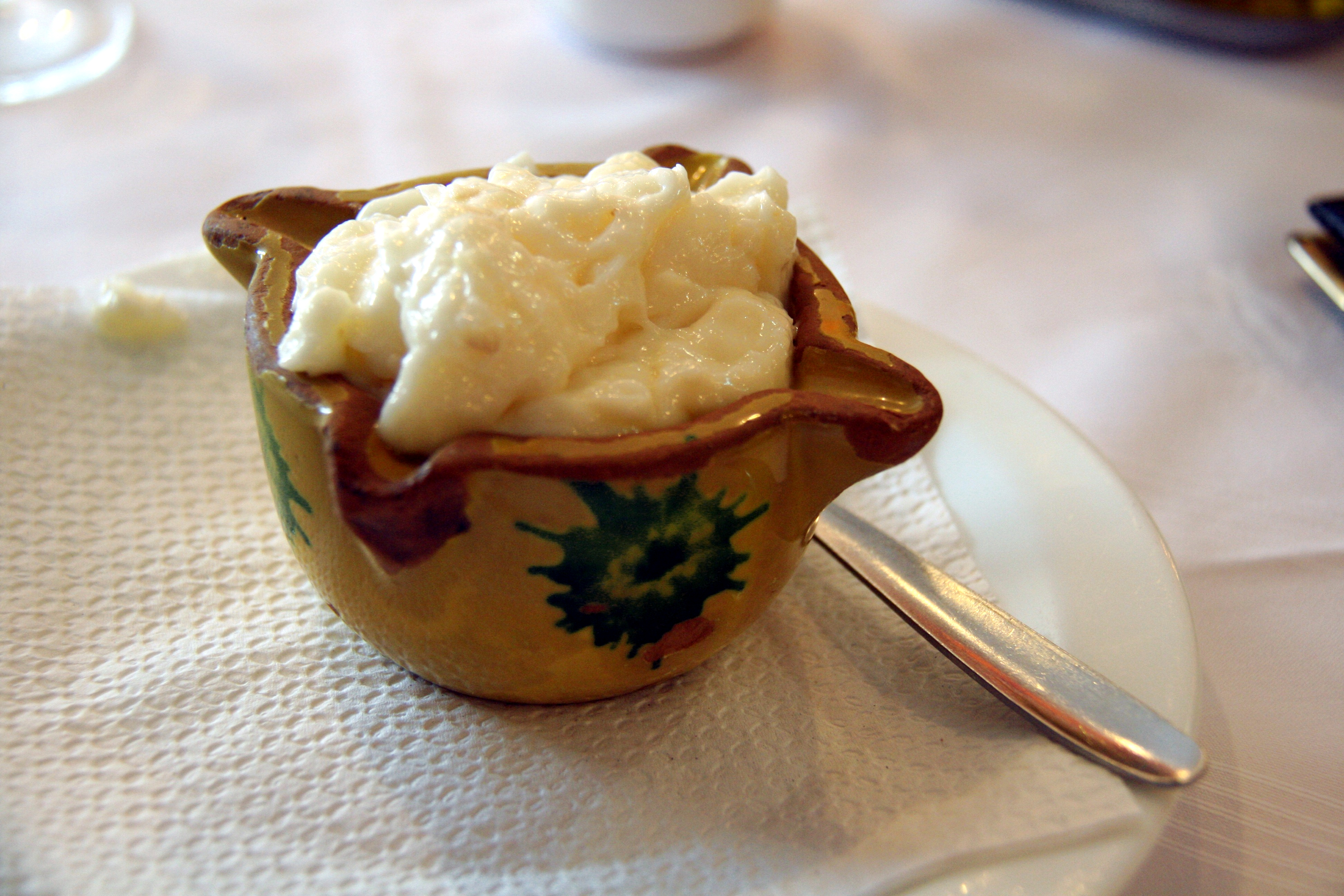
Aïoli

Depending on the recipe variations, the fish and the brunoise are cooked independently, or together like a fish stew in court-bouillon. At the end of cooking, the fish stock is bound with aïoli and olive oil. Like with bouillabaisse, depending on tastes and local customs and traditions, the fish is served differently: as a garnish along aïoli, with rice, potatoes, or ratatouille, topped with the brunoise sauce. aïoli, or in fish soup. Bourride is sometimes served with garlic croutons.

== Variants ==
- A variant of bourride à la sétoise is traditionally prepared with a monkfish.
