= Three grand soups =

Classification of soups in Japan

The three grand soups of the world (Japanese: 世界三大スープ, Hepburn: sekai sandai sūpu) is a common term in Japan referring to four types of soup thought to be the best in the world. The origin of this term is unknown, though it was already in use by the 1980s. Notwithstanding the term, there are four soups referred to as "three grand soups."

== List ==
Ranking	Name	Image	Origin	Distinctive ingredients and description
1	Bouillabaisse		France	Traditional Provençal fish stew originating from Marseille. The ingredients typically include red rascasse, sea robin, European conger, and other local Mediterranean fishes as well as Provençal herbs and spices.
2	Shark fin soup		China	A traditional soup found in Chinese cuisine. Traditionally, Japan is one of the leading shark fin-exporting countries.
3	Borscht		Ukraine	Many variations, the one referred to is a cabbage and beet-based soup with meat. It is also a national dish of many Eastern and Central European countries such as Belarus, Russia, Ukraine and Poland. Borscht was introduced to Japan by writer Vasili Eroshenko.
3	Tom yum kung		Thailand	A type of Thai soup characterised by its distinct hot and sour flavours. The soup is typically made with prawns, fish sauce, chili peppers and local herbs such as lemongrass. Tom yum-flavored ramen is also popular in Japan.

== See also ==
- List of soups
