= Cacciucco =

Italian fish stew

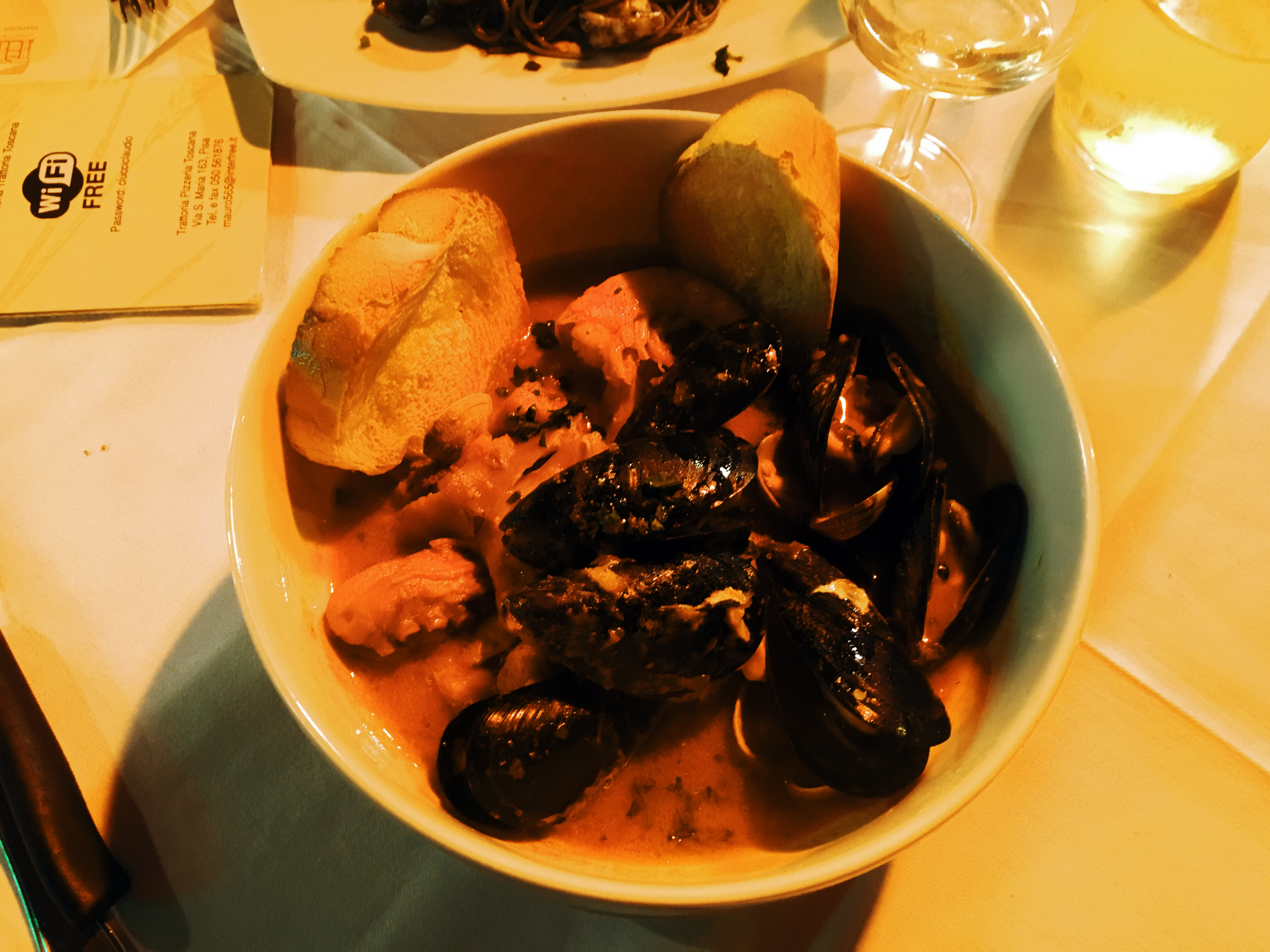
- Type: Fish stew
- Place of origin: Italy
- Region or state: Tuscany
- Main ingredients: Broth, fish, shellfish

Cacciucco (Italian: [katˈtʃukko]) is an Italian fish stew native to the western coastal towns of Tuscany. It is especially associated with the port city of Livorno, in Tuscany, and the town of Viareggio north of it.

== Overview ==
Cacciucco is a hearty stew consisting of several different types of fish and shellfish; one tradition holds that there should be five different types of fish in the soup, one for each letter c in cacciucco. A wide variety of Mediterranean fish and shellfish may be used, such as red gurnard, armored gurnard, scorpionfish (scorfano), small clams such as littleneck or manila, firm-fleshed fish such as monkfish or other whitefish, red snapper, John Dory, or grouper, mussels, shrimp, and calamari. Traditionalist chefs add a stone taken from the sea to the dish. Crabs, eels, cuttlefish, octopus, bream, mullet, or anything else caught that day might be used.

A wide variety of other ingredients are used in the broth, including various vegetables (which might include onions, tomatoes, leeks, zucchini, or yellow squash), spices (which might include garlic, aniseed, dried crushed red pepper, kosher salt, black pepper, parsley, thyme, or bay leaf) and other ingredients (which might include fish stock, tomato paste, vermouth, or wine, either white or red). There are many variants of cacciucco, varying by region and availability of ingredients.

The dish is traditionally attributed to the Near East, as the word cacciucco comes from the Turkish kaçukli ("bits and pieces" or "odds and ends"), which reflects how the stew is made, from a variety of fish.

Pellegrino Artusi, in his 1891 cookbook, gave a recipe using onions, garlic, oil, parsley, salt, and pepper, with:

whatever fish you may have on hand, including sole, red mullet, gurnard, dogfish, mantis shrimp, and other types of fish in season, leaving the small fish whole and cutting the big ones into small pieces. Taste for seasoning; but in any case it is not a bad idea to add a little olive oil, since the amount of soffritto was quite small

and served "on two separate platters: on one you place the fish... and on the other... finger-thick slices of bread to soak up all the broth.

== Similar dishes ==
Cacciucco is similar to other types of fish stew, such as the French bouillabaisse, Greek kakavia, Spanish zarzuela, and Portuguese caldeirada and the Vietnamese canh chua cá that is very similar also phonetically. Cioppino, another fish stew, was created by Italian American fisherman in San Francisco, who used the local Dungeness crab in a variation of the cacciucco recipe.

== See also ==
- List of fish dishes
