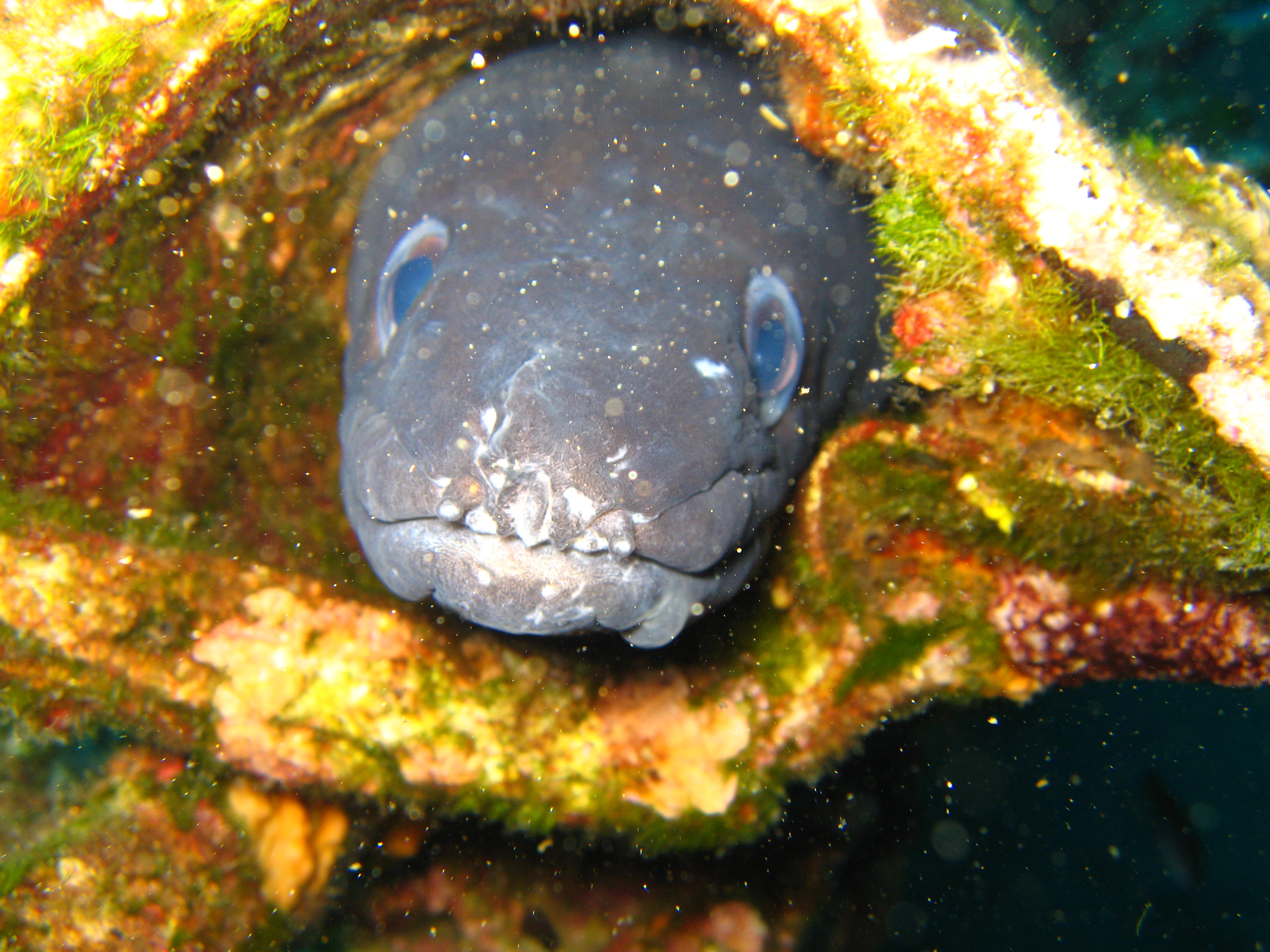

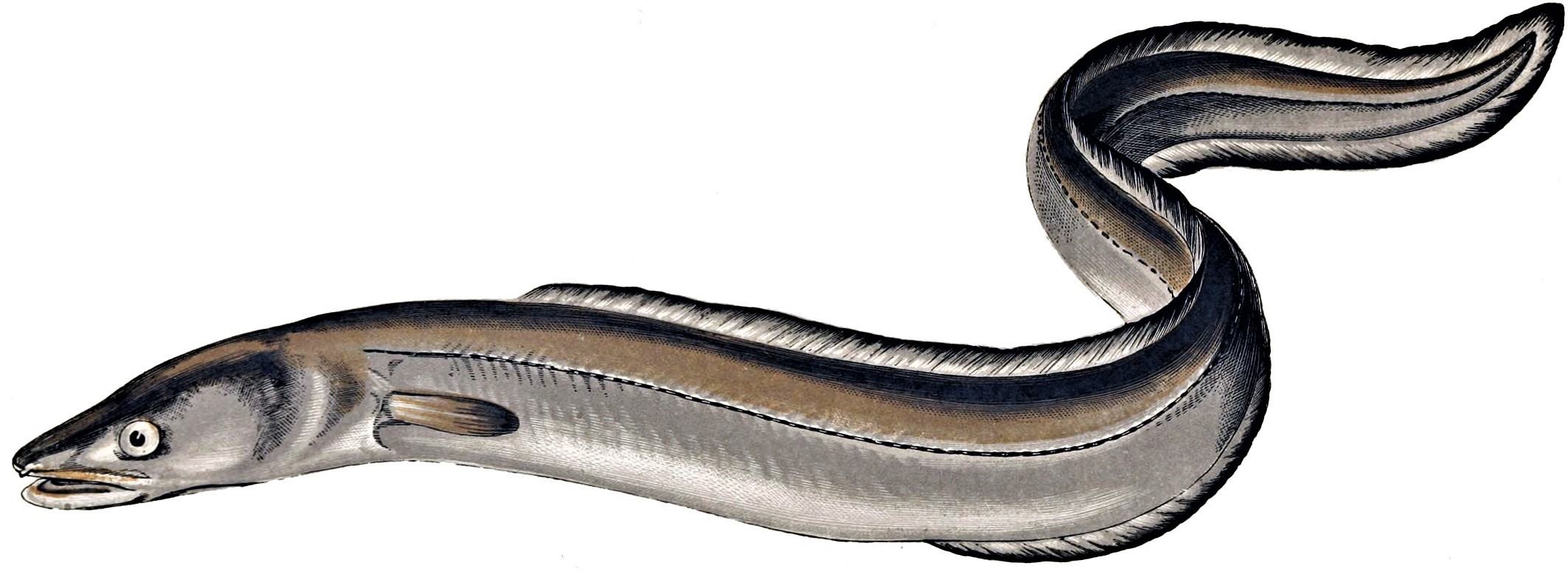

Conservation status
- Least Concern (IUCN 3.1)

Scientific classification
- Kingdom: Animalia
- Phylum: Chordata
- Class: Actinopterygii
- Division: Teleostei
- Order: Anguilliformes
- Family: Congridae
- Genus: Conger
- Species: C. conger

Binomial name
- Conger conger (Linnaeus, 1758)
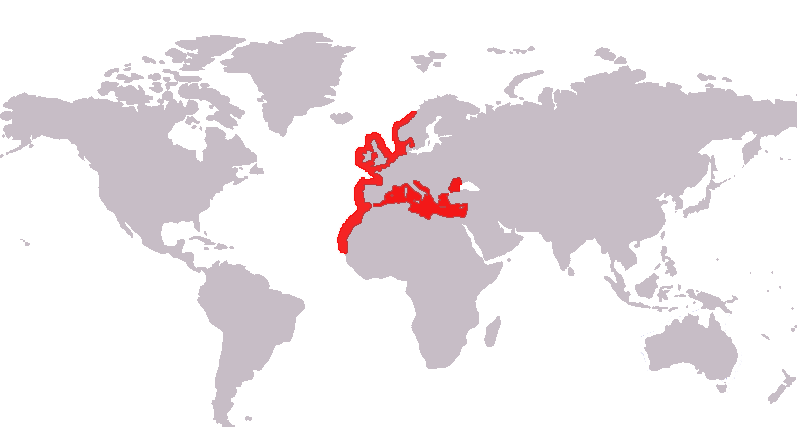
- The Range of the European conger

Synonyms
- List: Anguilla conger (Linnaeus, 1758); Anguilla obtusa Swainson, 1839; Conger communis Costa, 1844; Conger niger (Risso, 1810); Conger rubescens Ranzani, 1840; Conger verus Risso, 1827; Conger vulgaris Yarrell, 1832; Leptocephalus candidissimus Costa, 1832; Leptocephalus conger (Linnaeus, 1758); Leptocephalus gussoni Cocco, 1829; Leptocephalus inaequalis Facciolà, 1883; Leptocephalus lineatus Bonnaterre, 1788; Leptocephalus morrisii Gmelin, 1789; Leptocephalus pellucidus (Couch, 1832); Leptocephalus spallanzani Risso, 1810; Leptocephalus stenops Kaup, 1856; Leptocephalus vitreus Kölliker, 1853; Muraena conger Linnaeus, 1758; Muraena nigra Risso, 1810; Ophidium pellucidum Couch, 1832; Ophisoma obtusa (Swainson, 1839)

= European conger =

Species of fish

The European conger (Conger conger) is a species of conger of the family Congridae. It is the heaviest eel in the world and native to the northeast Atlantic, including the Mediterranean Sea.

== Description ==
European congers have an average adult length of 1.5 m (5 ft), a maximum known length of around 3 m (9.8 ft) and maximum weight of roughly 72 kg (159 lb), but possibly up to 160 kg (350 lb), making them the largest eels in the world by weight. They can be rivaled or marginally exceeded in length by the largest species of moray eel but these tend to be slenderer and thus weigh less than the larger congers. Average specimens caught will weigh only 2.5 to 25 kg (5.5 to 55.1 lb). Females, with an average length at sexual maturity of 2 m (6 ft 7 in), are much larger than males, with an average length at sexual maturity of 1.2 m (3 ft 11 in).

The body is very long, anguilliform, and is without scales. The colour is usually grey, but can also be blackish. The belly is white. A row of small white spots is aligned along the lateral line. The head is almost conical, and slightly depressed. The snout is rounded and prominent, with lateral olfactory holes. The large gill openings are in the lateral position. The conical teeth are arranged in rows on the jaws. The dorsal and anal fins are confluent with the caudal fin. Pectoral fins are present, while ventral fins are absent.

== Distribution and habitat ==
This species can be found in the eastern Atlantic from Norway and Iceland to Senegal, and also in the Mediterranean and Black Sea at 0–500 m (0–1,640 ft) of depth, although they may reach depths of 3,600 m (11,800 ft) during their migrations.

It is sometimes seen in very shallow water by the shore, but can also go down to 1,170 m (3,840 ft). It is usually present on rough, rocky, broken ground, close to the coast when young, moving to deeper waters when adult. In the northern Adriatic Sea, congers are among the primary fish species that inhabit tegnùe, reefs formed from formations of sedimentary and organogenic rocks common across the seafloor.

== Ecology and behaviour ==
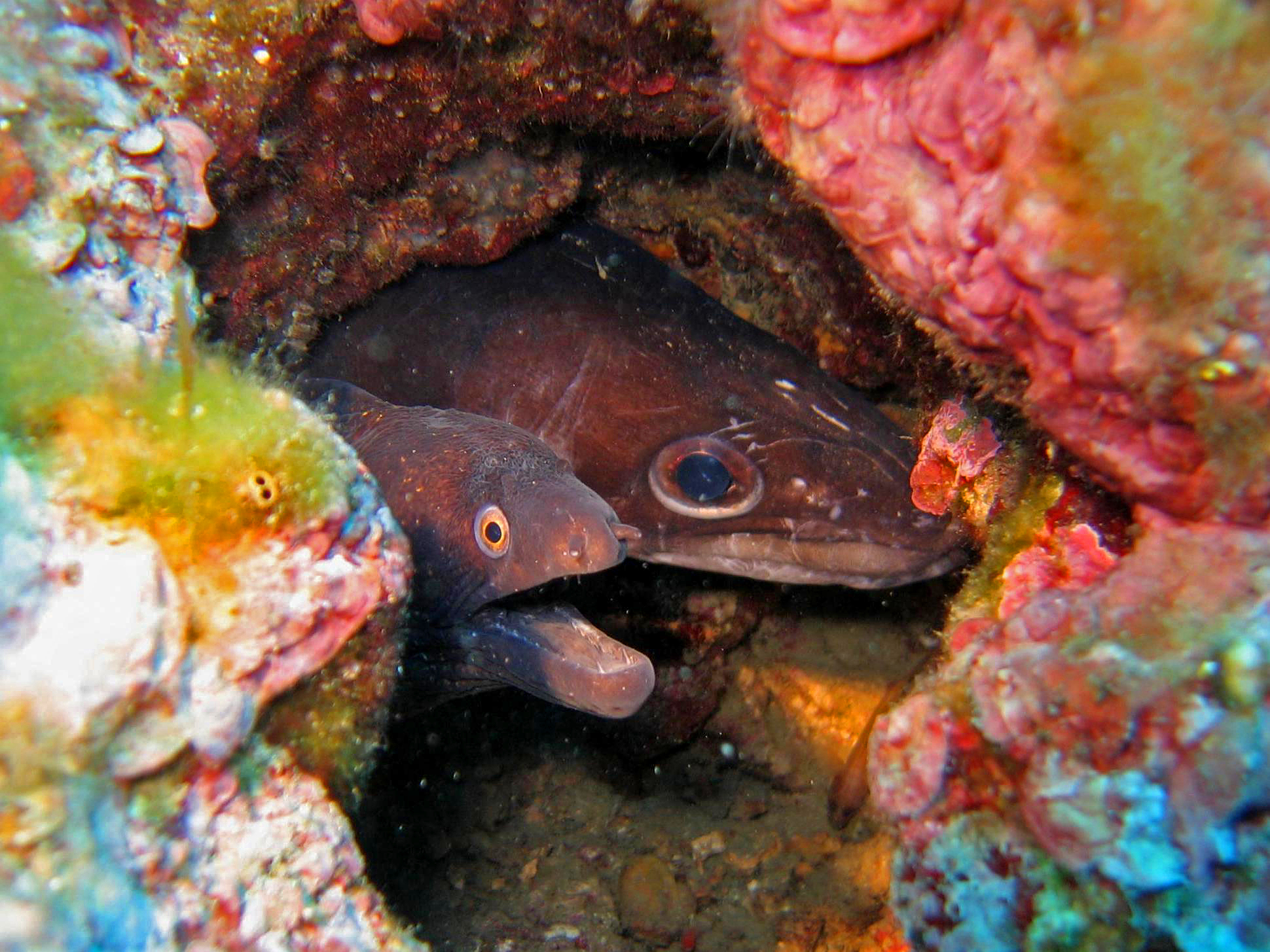
Conger conger and a Mediterranean moray eel in one hole, at the Protected Marine Area of Portofino

Conger eels have habits similar to moray eels. They usually live amongst rocks in holes, or "eel pits", sometimes in one hole together with moray eels. They come out from their holes at night to hunt. They are nocturnal predators that mainly feed on fish, cephalopods, and crustaceans, and are thought to scavenge on dead and rotting fish, as well as actively hunt live fish.

Congers can be aggressive to humans, and large specimens can pose a danger to divers.

=== Migration and reproduction ===
When conger eels are between 5 and 15 years old, their bodies undergo a transformation, with the reproductive organs of both males and females increasing in size and the skeleton reducing in mass and the teeth falling out. Females appear to increase in weight and size more than the males. Conger eels then make migrations to spawning areas in the Mediterranean and the Atlantic, "although the existence of one or multiple spawning grounds for the species remains uncertain". The female conger eels produce several million eggs, and both the females and males die after spawning. Once hatched, the larval conger eels begin to swim back to shallower waters, where they live until they reach maturity. They then migrate to repeat the cycle.

== Interactions with humans ==
=== As food ===
Historic evidence of human consumption of European congers dates to the Middle Pleistocene during the Last Interglacial. The Neanderthal site at Gruta da Figueira Brava, Portugal, shows evidence of recurring capture and cooking of congers alongside other eel species such as European eels and Mediterranean morays.

Conger is traditionally considered one of the "three fishes" used to make the Provençal fish stew Bouillabaisse, alongside rascasse and grondin (any of a number of species of gurnards or sea robin).

=== Conservation ===
European congers are particularly vulnerable to the presence of submerged munitions due to instinctively seeking seafloor crevices for nesting. This makes them more likely than other species to enter corroded casings (such as from torpedoes, bombs, or emptied shells) or the interstices of munition piles. There, they may come into contact with leaking toxins from corroded munitions. A 2012 study showed that congers living near a submerged munitions dump contained more mercury and arsenic than elsewhere, and sometimes exhibited severe skin lesions and nematode infestations.

== Gallery ==
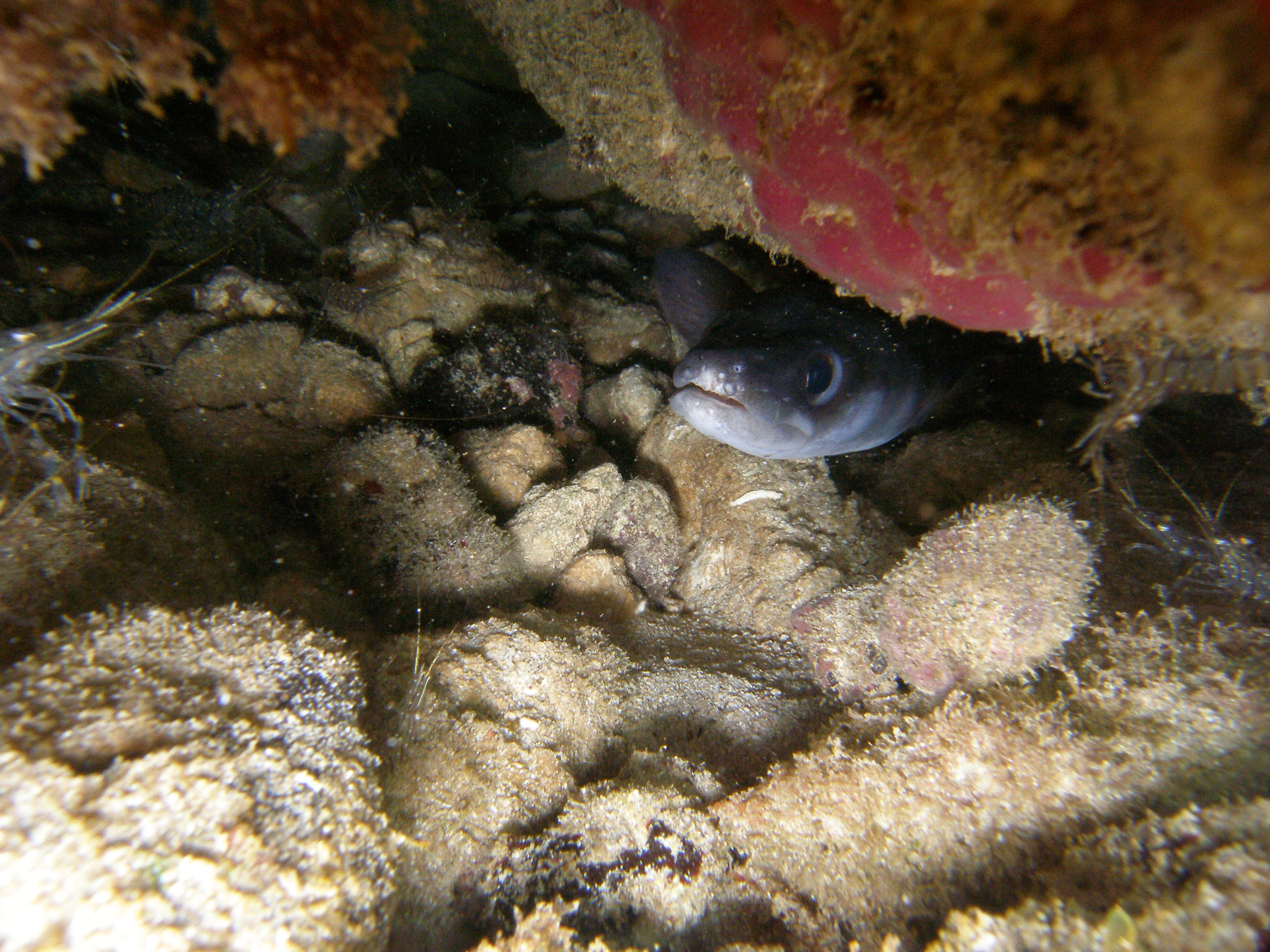

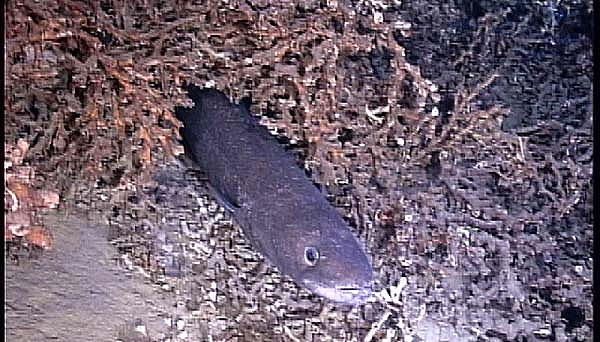

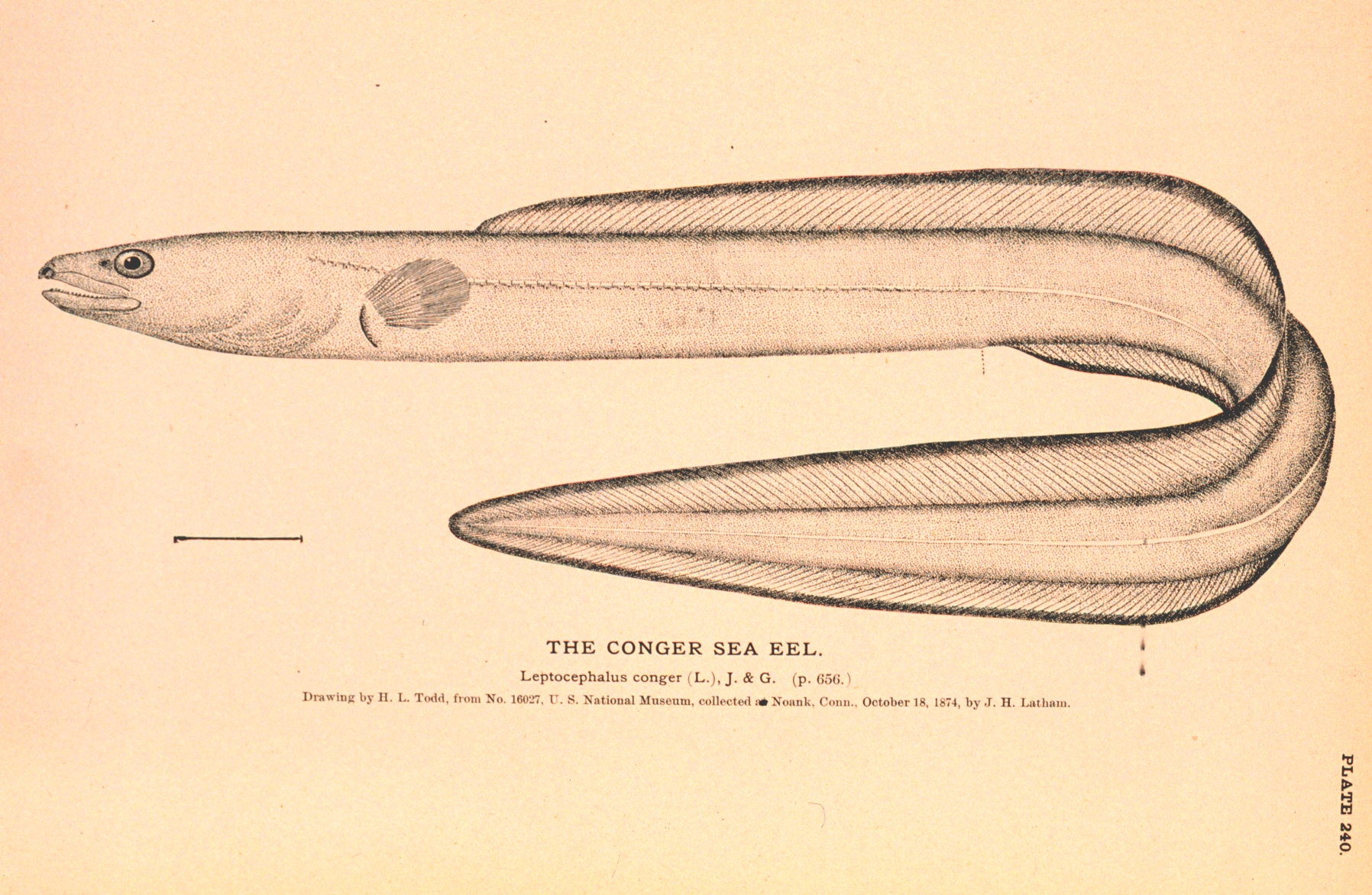
