= Kakavia =

Kakavia may refer to:

- Kakavia (soup), a Greek fish stew
- Kakavia (border crossing), a border crossing between Albania and Greece
- Kakavijë (Greek: Kakavia), a village in southern Albania
