= Caldeirada =

Portuguese and Galician fish stew

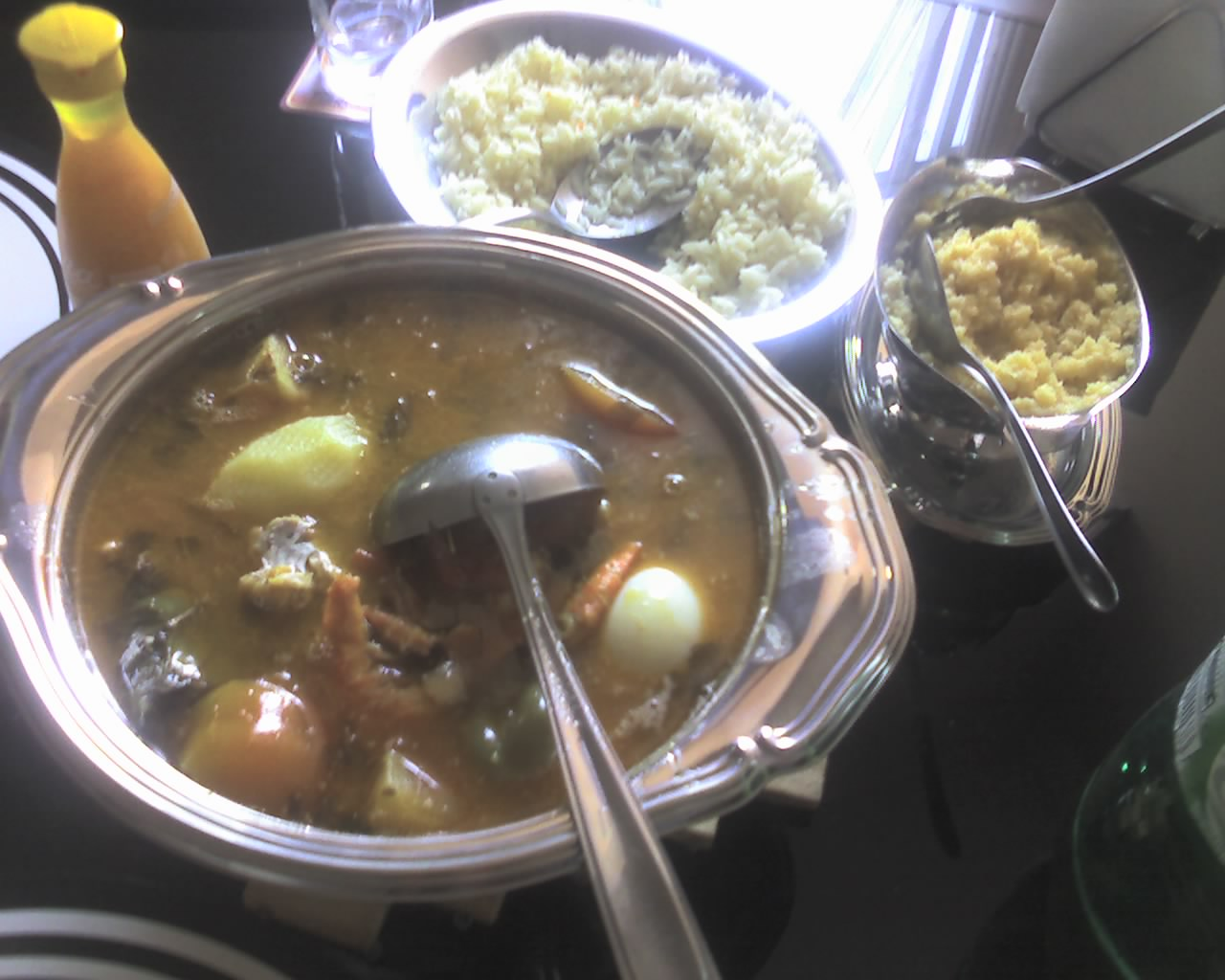
- Caldeirada
- Type: Fish stew
- Place of origin: Portugal, Galicia
- Main ingredients: Fish, potatoes

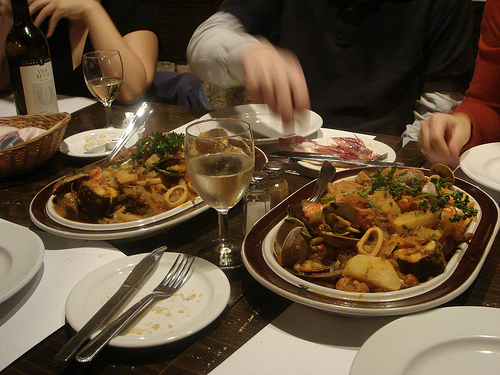
Caldeirada

Caldeirada (Portuguese pronunciation: [kaldɐjˈɾaðɐ, kɐwdejˈɾadɐ]) is a Portuguese and Galician (Northwestern Spain region) fish stew consisting of a wide variety of fish and potatoes, along with other ingredients. A fishermen's stew, the dish has been described as "a fish muddle that varies from town to town and depends on what the fishermen have managed to catch."

Caldeirada is similar to other types of fish stew, such as the French bouillabaisse, Greek kakavia, Spanish zarzuela, and Italian cacciucco.

One cookbook states that the dish typically consists of "a fifty-fifty mix of lean and oily fish, "along with shellfish such as clams and mussels, and often squid or octopus as well. This recipe uses two kinds of oily fish (such as mackerel, swordfish, or tuna) and two kinds of lean whitefish, (such as cod, monkfish, hake, flounder, and haddock), plus shrimp, mussels in the shell, and squid.

Another cookbook gives as a typical assortment in a caldeirada as conger eel, angel shark, sea bass or sea bream, red gurnard, sardines, ray, shrimp, and clams.

Another cookbook recommends 300 g (about 11 ounces) of fish per person. Other components of the dish include vegetables (such as potatoes, onions, green peppers, tomatoes, and tomato purée or tomato paste); spices (such as salt and black pepper, bay leaf, coriander, parsley, sweet and hot paprika, white pepper, and oregano); and other ingredients (such as vermicelli, olive oil, allspice, port wine, white wine, and whisky or brandy). Some recipes do not add salt to caldeirada, because the brininess of the shellfish already adds salt.

Caldeirada is also known in Brazil, a former Portuguese colony, where it has been described as an aromatic chowder of river fish and coriander.

== See also ==
- List of stews
