= Rouille =

French garnish sauce

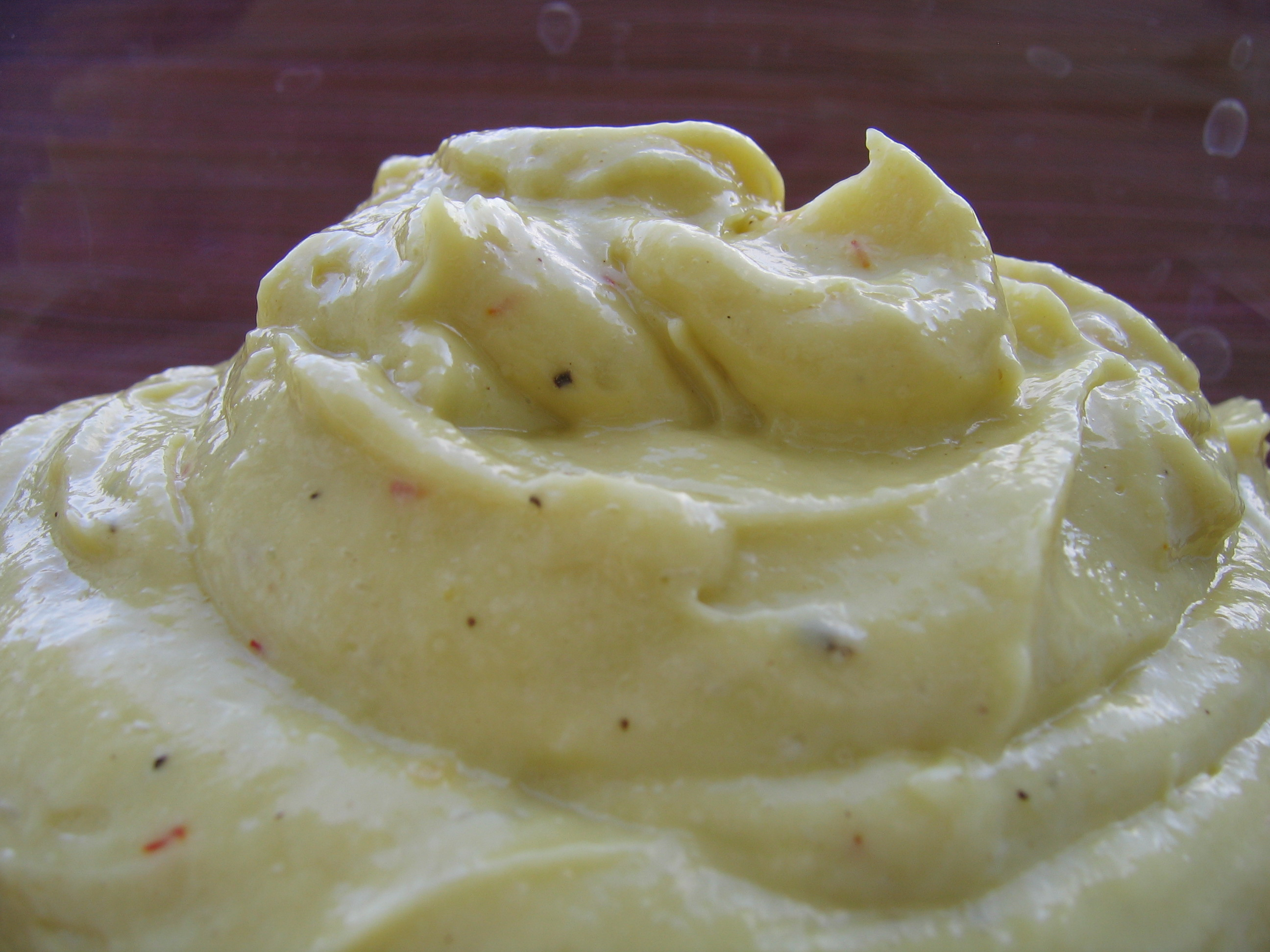
Rouille sauce

Rouille (French pronunciation: [ʁuj]; Provençal: rolha, lit. 'rust') is a sauce that consists of egg yolk and olive oil with breadcrumbs, garlic, saffron and cayenne pepper. It is served as a garnish with fish and fish soup, notably bouillabaisse. Rouille is most often used in the cuisine of Provence.

== See also ==
- Aioli – Garlic-based sauce
- Romesco – Tomato-based sauce
- Salvitxada – Like romesco thickened with toast
