= Bouillabaisse =

Traditional Provençal fish soup

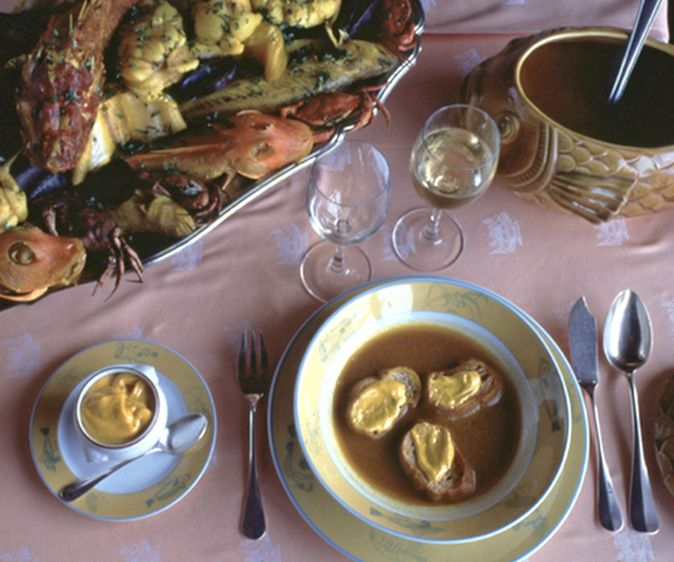
- A traditional Marseille bouillabaisse, with the broth served first, and the seafood then served separately
- Type: Stew
- Place of origin: France
- Region or state: Provence
- Main ingredients: Fish (Scorpionfish, sea robin, European conger) herbs spices

Bouillabaisse (/ˌbuːjəˈbɛs/ BOO-yə-BESS, US also /-ˈbeɪs/ -BAYSS, French: [bujabɛ(ː)s]; Provençal: bolhabaissa [ˌbuʎaˈβajsɔ, ˌbujaˈbajsɔ]) is a traditional Provençal fish soup originating in the port city of Marseille. The word is originally a compound of the two Provençal verbs bouillir ('to boil') and baisser ('to reduce heat', i.e. 'simmer').

Bouillabaisse was originally a dish made by Marseille fishermen, using bony rockfish, which they were unable to sell to restaurants or markets. There are at least three kinds of fish in a traditional bouillabaisse: typically red rascasse (Scorpaena scrofa); sea robin; and European conger. It can also include gilt-head bream, turbot, monkfish, mullet, or European hake. It usually also includes shellfish and other seafood such as sea urchins, mussels, velvet crabs, spider crabs, or octopus. More expensive versions may add langoustine (Dublin Bay prawn; Norway lobster), though this was not part of the traditional dish made by Marseille fishermen. Vegetables such as leeks, onions, tomatoes, celery, and potatoes are simmered together with the broth and served with the fish. The broth is traditionally served with rouille, a mayonnaise made of olive oil, garlic, saffron, and cayenne pepper, on grilled slices of bread.

What makes a bouillabaisse different from other fish soups is the selection of Provençal herbs and spices in the broth; the use of bony local Mediterranean fish; the way the fish are added one at a time, and brought to a boil; and the method of serving. In Marseille, the broth is served first in a soup plate with slices of bread and rouille, then the fish is served separately on a large platter (see image at top); or, more simply, as Julia Child suggests, the fish and broth are brought to the table separately and served together in large soup plates.

== Marseille bouillabaisse ==
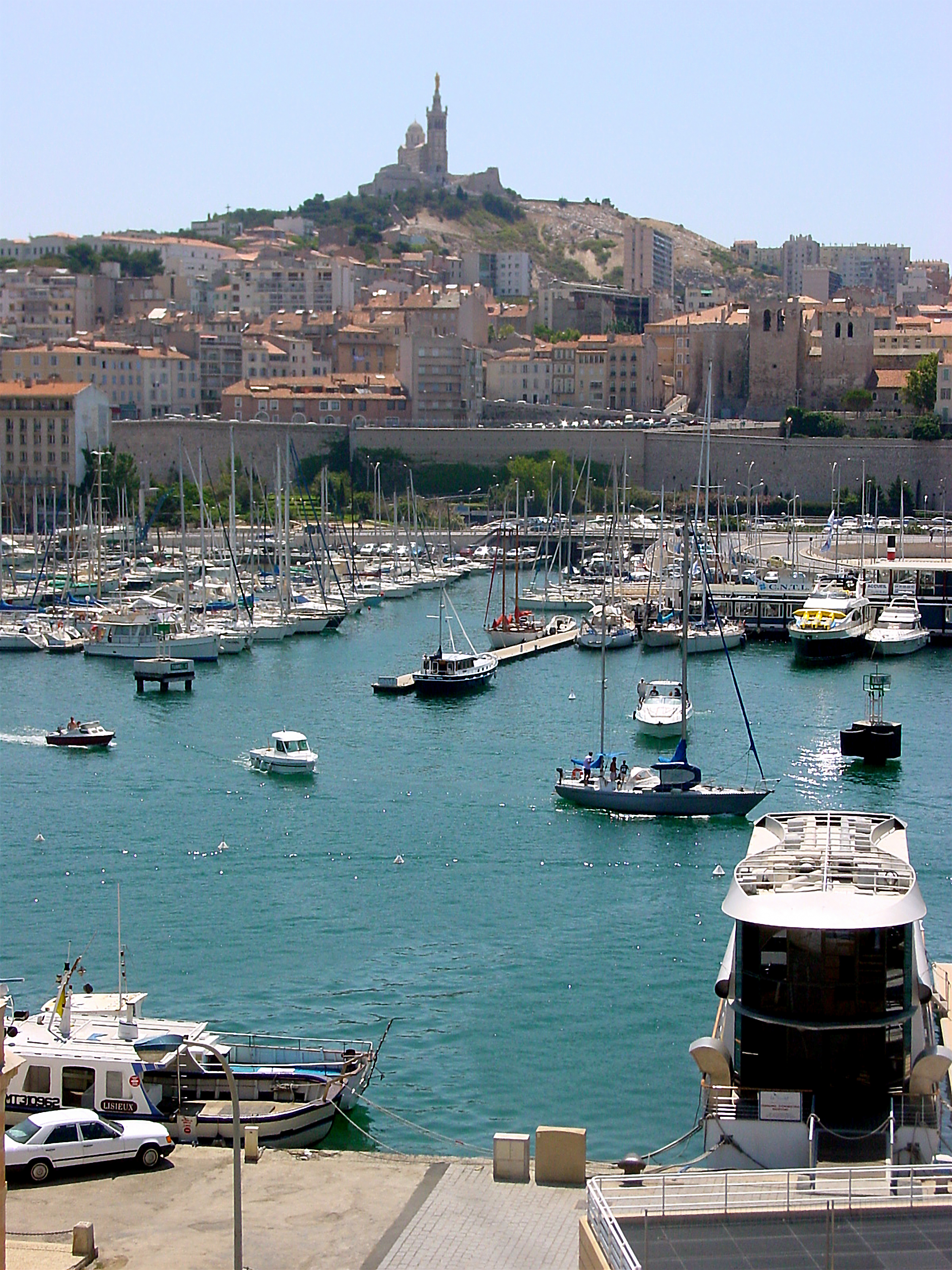
The Vieux-Port of Marseille, the birthplace of bouillabaisse

Recipes for bouillabaisse vary from family to family in Marseille, and local restaurants dispute which versions are the most authentic.

In 1980, 11 Marseille restaurateurs collaborated to draw up the Bouillabaisse Charter which codified both ingredients and method of preparation. An authentic Marseille bouillabaisse must include rascasse (Scorpaena scrofa), a bony rockfish which lives in the calanque and reefs close to shore. It usually also has congre (eng: European conger) and grondin (eng: sea robin). According to the Michelin Guide Vert, the four essential elements of a true bouillabaisse are the presence of rascasse, the freshness of the fish; olive oil, and excellent saffron.

The American chef and food writer Julia Child, who lived in Marseille for a year, wrote: "to me the telling flavor of bouillabaisse comes from two things: the Provençal soup base—garlic, onions, tomatoes, olive oil, fennel, saffron, thyme, bay, and usually a bit of dried orange peel—and, of course, the fish—lean (non-oily), firm-fleshed, soft-fleshed, gelatinous, and shellfish." Other foreign residents in France have written about bouillabaisse. Stephen Lister, a British expatriate in Provence, wrote, "When eaten where it is made commercially it is a lethal dish ... even when the stuff is made honestly ... the ingredients are not of much importance, because all you are going to taste anyway is garlic, saffron and something unidentifiable which always reminds me of chlorinated drains". Elizabeth David was less censorious, but by no means laudatory:

I would not myself think it a great deprivation if I were told that I could never again eat a bouillabaisse. I have had good ones and bad ones, but to be quite truthful I have also eaten far superior dishes of the same sort, call it a soup or a stew or what you like, in Italy, notably on the Adriatic coast.

== Ingredients ==
The ingredients of a traditional Marseille bouillabaisse vary depending upon what fish are available that day and the taste of the chef. These are the typical ingredients used in one of the most traditional Marseille restaurants, the Grand Bar des Goudes on Rue Désirée-Pelleprat:

Four kilograms of fish and shellfish, including, on a typical day, grondin (sea robin), Rascasse (Scorpaena scrofa), rouget grondin (red gurnard), congre (conger eel), baudroie (lotte, or monkfish), Saint-Pierre (John Dory), vive (weever), and sea urchins. Other ingredients in the broth include a kilogram of potatoes, seven cloves of garlic, onions, ripe tomatoes, and a cup of olive oil. The broth is seasoned with a bouquet garni, fennel, eight pistils of saffron, salt and Cayenne pepper.

The rouille, a spicy mayonnaise which is spread on thick slices of country bread and floated on the bouillabaisse when served, is made with an egg yolk, two cloves of garlic, a cup of olive oil, and ten pistils of saffron, and is seasoned with salt and Cayenne pepper.

== Variations ==
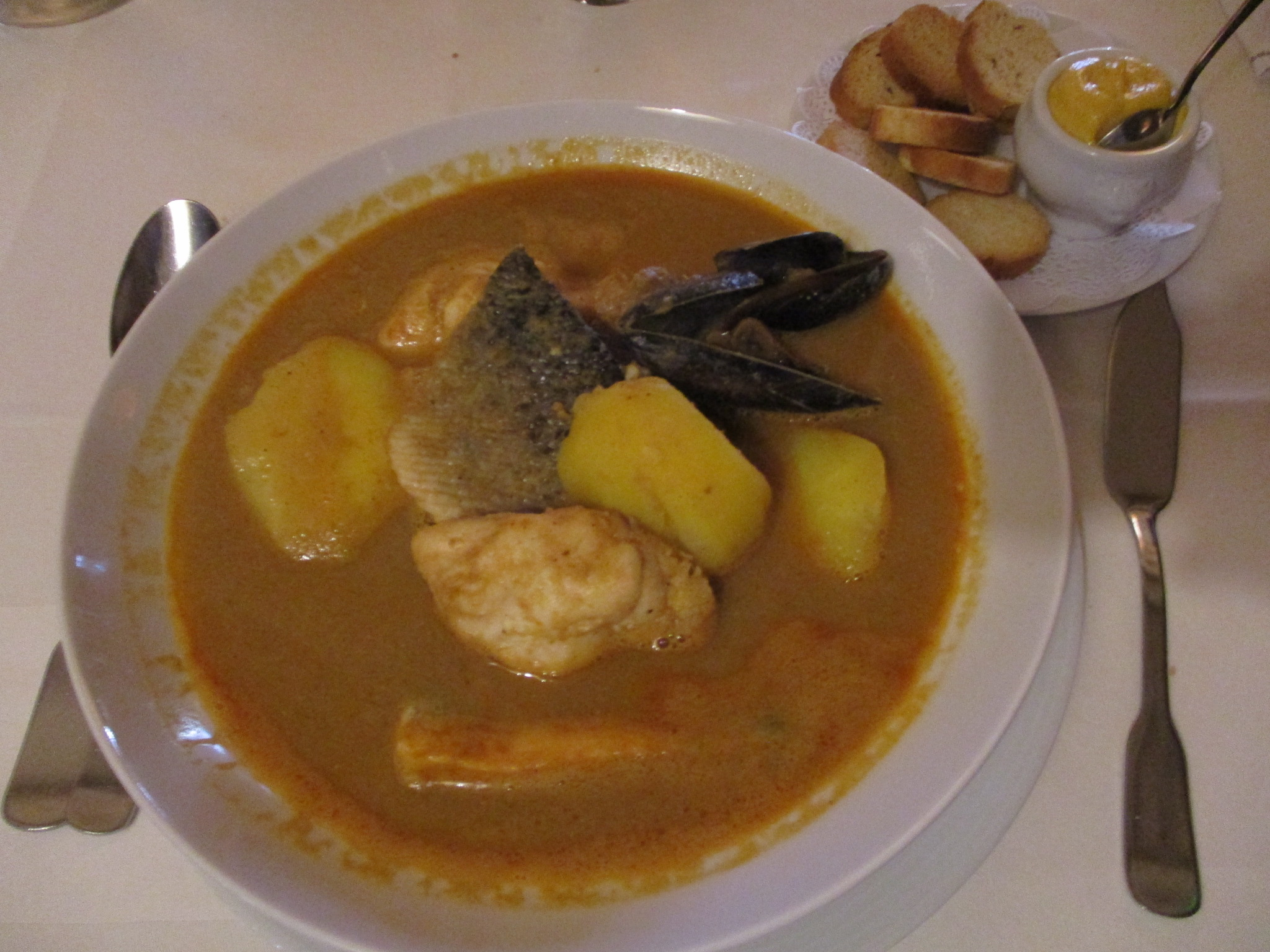
A bouillabaisse at the Old Port in Marseille

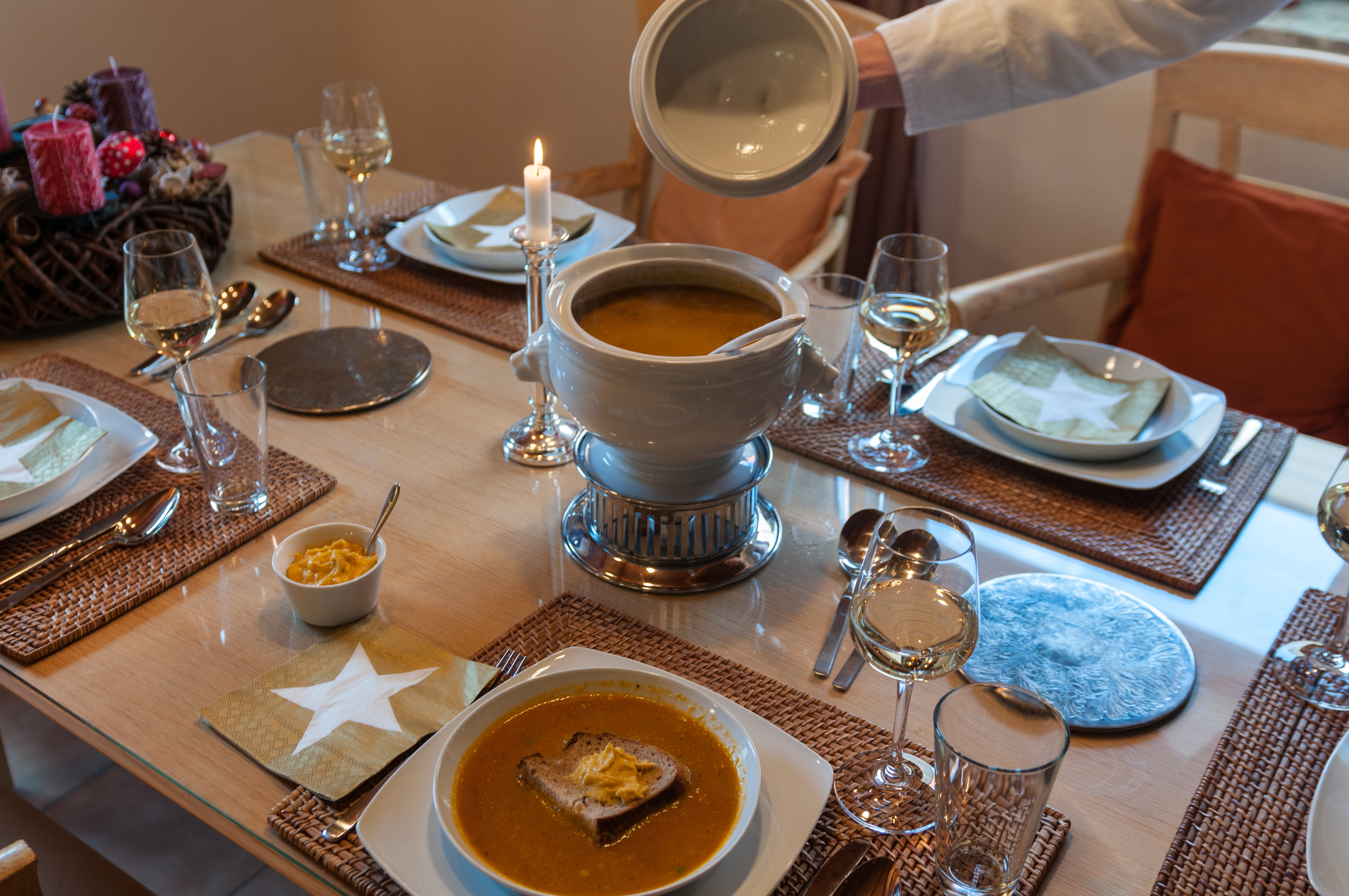
Traditional serving of the broth first

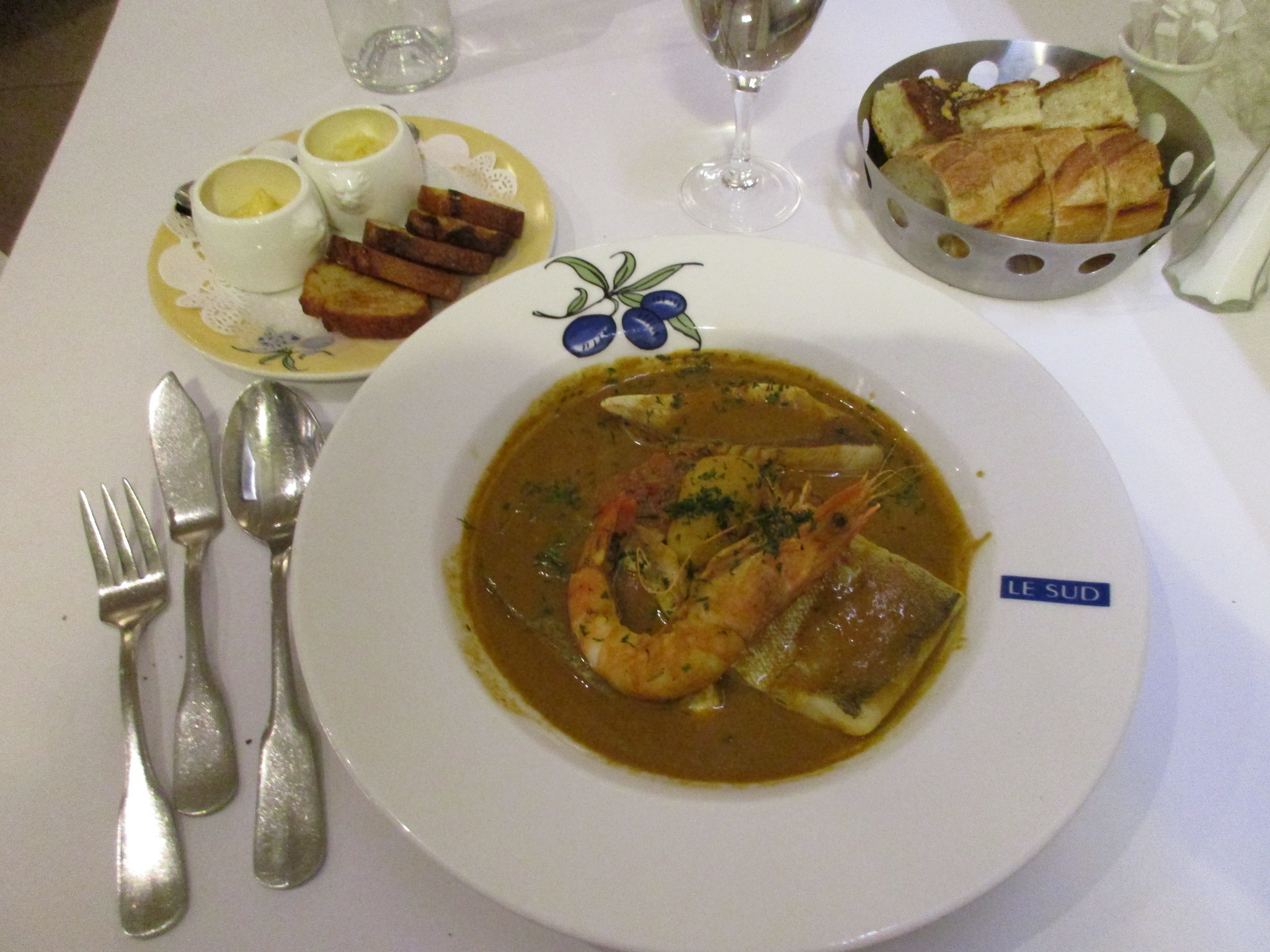
A version by three-star Lyon chef Paul Bocuse from his restaurant "Le Sud."

In the traditional bouillabaisse served in Marseille restaurants, the bouillon is served first, very hot, with the rouille spread on thick slices of bread rubbed with garlic. The fish and potatoes are served next on a separate platter.

Three-star chef Paul Bocuse from Lyon created his own version at his restaurant Le Sud, with the seafood served together with the broth.

In another version, in the Petit Larousse de la Cuisine, the broth is served over bread with the rouille on top, and the fish and crabs are served on a large platter.

Other variations add different seasonings, such as orange peel, and sometimes a cup of white wine or cognac is added.

== Marcel Pagnol ==
The French screenwriter and playwright Marcel Pagnol, a member of the Académie française and a native of Marseille, showed his own idea of a proper bouillabaisse in two of his films. In Cigalon (1935), the chef Cigalon serves a bouillabaisse provençale aux poissons de roche, (Bouillabaisse of Provence with rockfish) made with a kilogram of local fish; Scorpaena scrofa (rascasse); capelin; angler fish (baudroie); John Dory (Saint-Pierre); and slipper lobster (cigale de mer). "When I put these fish into the pan," Cigalon says, "they were still wiggling their tails." Cigalon specifies that the slices of bread served with the broth should be thick and not toasted, and that the rouille "should not have too much pepper."

In the 1936 film César, Pagnol's hero Marius reveals the secret of the bouillabaisse of a small bistro near the port in Marseille. "Everybody knows it," Marius says: "they perfume the broth with a cream of sea urchins."

== History ==
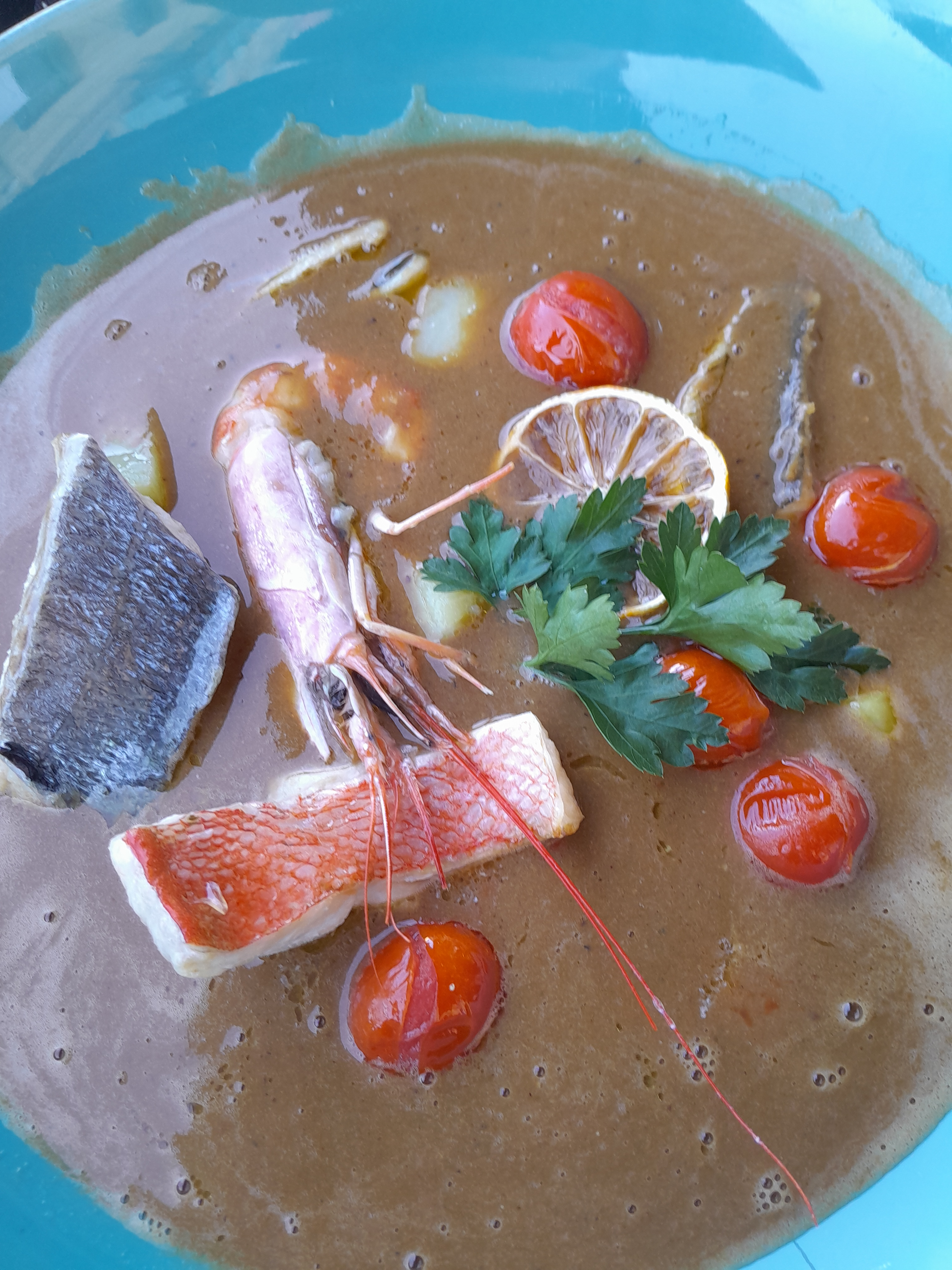
Bouillabaisse, served in a restaurant in Nice, France

The Phoceans who founded Marseille in 600 BC, ate a simple fish broth known in Ancient Greek as "kakavia". Another fish soup also appears in Roman mythology: it is the dish that Venus fed to Vulcan. They were different from the boullabaisse as they did not include saffron and rouille.

Generally fish soups are found in France (bourride, chaudrée), Greece, Italy (zuppa di pesce), Portugal (caldeirada), Spain (sopa de pescado y marisco, Catalonia (suquet de peix), and all the countries bordering the Mediterranean Sea. What makes a bouillabaisse different from these other dishes are the local Provençal herbs and spices, the particular selection of bony Mediterranean coastal fish, and the way the broth is served separately from the fish and vegetables.

== See also ==
- Bourride
- Cacciucco
- Caldeirada
- Cioppino
- Cotriade
- Gumbo
- Halászlé, Hungarian Fisherman's soup
- Kakavia
- List of fish and seafood soups
- List of French dishes
- List of French soups and stews
- List of soups
- List of stews
- Our Man Flint, movie
- Paila marina
- Ukha, Russian fish soup
- Three grand soups

== Sources ==
- David, Elizabeth (2008) [1960]. French Provincial Cooking. London: Folio Society. OCLC 809349711.
- Lister, Stephen (1965). More Fit for a Bishop. London: Peter Davies. OCLC 12270119.
