= USS Dogfish =

Submarine of the United States

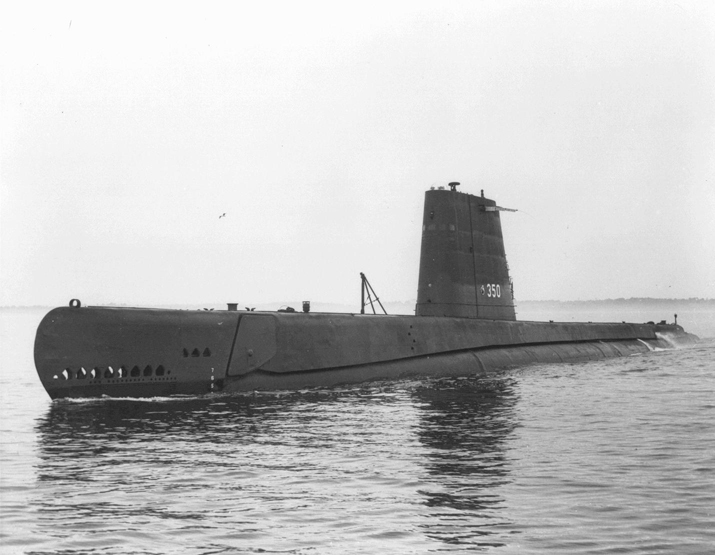
- USS Dogfish (SS-350)

History

United States
- Name: USS Dogfish (SS-350)
- Builder: Electric Boat Company, Groton, Connecticut
- Laid down: 22 June 1944
- Launched: 27 October 1945
- Commissioned: 29 April 1946
- Stricken: 28 July 1972
- Fate: Sold to Brazil, 28 July 1972

Brazil
- Name: Guanabara (S-10)
- Acquired: 28 July 1972
- Fate: Scrapped, 1983

General characteristics
- Class & type: Balao-class diesel-electric submarine
- Displacement: 1,526 tons (1,550 t) surfaced; 2,424 tons (2,460 t) submerged
- Length: 311 ft 9 in (95.02 m)
- Beam: 27 ft 3 in (8.31 m)
- Draft: 16 ft 10 in (5.13 m) maximum
- Propulsion: 4 × General Motors Model 16-278A V16 diesel engines driving electrical generators; 2 × 126-cell Sargo batteries; 4 × high-speed General Electric electric motors with reduction gears; 2 × propellers; 5,400 shp (4.0 MW) surfaced; 2,740 shp (2.0 MW) submerged
- Speed: 20.25 knots (37 km/h) surfaced; 8.75 knots (16 km/h) submerged
- Range: 11,000 nm (20,000 km) surfaced at 10 knots (19 km/h)
- Endurance: 48 hours at 2 knots (4 km/h) submerged; 75 days on patrol
- Test depth: 400 ft (120 m)
- Complement: 10 officers, 70–71 enlisted
- Armament: 10 × 21-inch (533 mm) torpedo tubes; 6 forward, 4 aft; 24 torpedoes; 1 × 5-inch (127 mm) / 25 caliber deck gun; Bofors 40 mm and Oerlikon 20 mm cannon

General characteristics (Guppy II)
- Class & type: none
- Displacement: 1,870 tons (1,900 t) surfaced; 2,440 tons (2,480 t) submerged
- Length: 307 ft (94 m)
- Beam: 27 ft 4 in (8.33 m)
- Draft: 17 ft (5.2 m)
- Propulsion: Snorkel added; Batteries upgraded to GUPPY type, capacity expanded to 504 cells (1 × 184 cell, 1 × 68 cell, and 2 × 126 cell batteries); 4 × high-speed electric motors replaced with 2 × low-speed direct drive electric motors
- Speed: Surfaced: 18.0 knots (33.3 km/h) maximum; 13.5 knots (25.0 km/h) cruising; Submerged: 16.0 knots (29.6 km/h) for ½ hour; 9.0 knots (16.7 km/h) snorkeling; 3.5 knots (6.5 km/h) cruising
- Range: 15,000 nm (28,000 km) surfaced at 11 knots (20 km/h)
- Endurance: 48 hours at 4 knots (7.4 km/h) submerged
- Complement: 9–10 officers; 5 petty officers; 70 enlisted men
- Sensors & processing systems: WFA active sonar; JT passive sonar; Mk 106 torpedo fire control system
- Armament: 10 × 21 inch (533 mm) torpedo tubes; (six forward, four aft); all guns removed

USS Dogfish (hull number SS-350), a Balao-class submarine, was the only vessel of the United States Navy to be named for the dogfish.

Her keel was laid down on 22 June 1944 by the Electric Boat Company in Groton, Connecticut. She was launched on 27 October 1945 sponsored by Mrs. A. M. Morgan, and commissioned on 29 April 1946.

Dogfish sailed out of New London, Connecticut, on local duties and cruised to the Caribbean Sea and Bermuda to conduct training. She was overhauled and extensively modernized at the Philadelphia Naval Shipyard from August 1947 to April 1948, and then served in experimental projects as well as normal operations at New London. From 31 October to 19 November 1948 she took part in large-scale fleet exercises ranging from the waters off Florida to Davis Strait between Labrador and Greenland.

She cruised to Scotland, England, and France between 4 February and 3 April 1949 and joined in a convoy exercise off Cape Hatteras in February and March 1952, and operated along the east coast and in the Caribbean Sea during the next three years.

Dogfish sailed from New London on 1 March 1955 for her first tour with the Sixth Fleet in the Mediterranean Sea, Dogfish entered the Mediterranean through the strait of Gibraltar. While in the Mediterranean, Dogfish made port calls in Gibraltar, Italy, France, and Spain before returning to her home port 6 June. The submarine called at Halifax, Nova Scotia, from 4 June to 14 June 1956 during NATO Operation New Broom. On 8 November, she stood by and fought the fires on the trawler Agda during local operations out of New London. She cruised to Faslane Bay in Scotland between 31 January and 12 April 1958 to evaluate new equipment, and from 23 May to 8 August 1959 served in the Mediterranean Sea. In October and November, she took part in NATO antisubmarine warfare exercises. After extensive overhaul, the vessel resumed local operations from New London through 1960.

== Transfer to Brazil ==
Dogfish was stricken from the Naval Vessel Register and sold to Brazil on 28 July 1972. She served the Brazilian Navy as Guanabara (S-10) until being deleted in 1983.

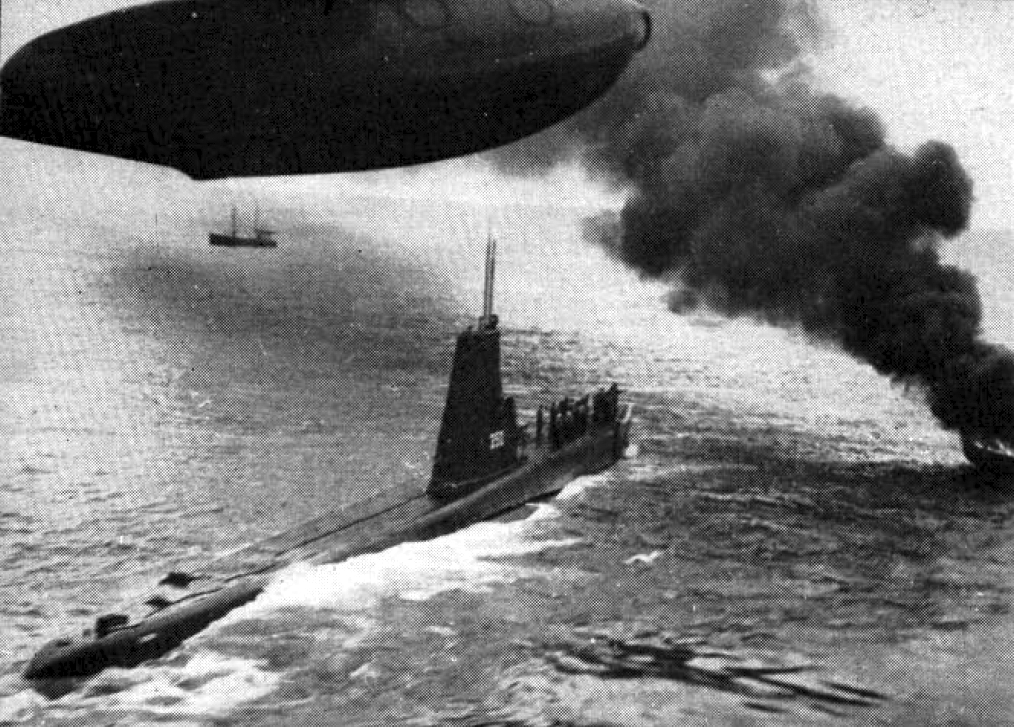
The U.S. Navy submarine USS Dogfish (SS-350) came to the aid of a burning fishing trawler off Long Island, New York (USA), in 1956.
