= Aïoli garni =

Provençal dish based on aïoli

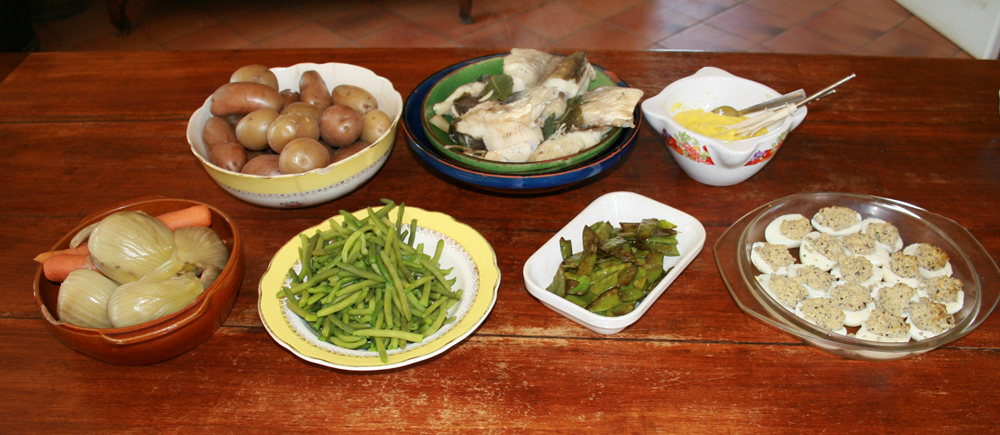
- Alternative names: grand aïoli; aïoli
- Course: main dish
- Region or state: Provence
- Main ingredients: aïoli; salted cod
- Ingredients generally used: boiled vegetables (carrots, potatoes, green beans, onions, artichokes); olive oil; escargots; hard-boiled eggs
- Variations: boiled white fish; stewed beef; boiled chicken

Aïoli garni or grand aïoli is a traditional Provençal dish or meal based on aïoli, usually accompanied by salt cod and boiled vegetables; other ingredients may include escargots, hard-boiled eggs and small boiled octopus. It may also be known simply as aïoli, like the sauce for which it is named.

== History ==
The aïoli garni is a traditional dish of Provence in southern France. It was described in 1897 by Jean-Baptiste Reboul in La Cuisinière Provençale. He gives as ingredients to accompany aïoli sauce: boiled salt cod, escargots boiled in salted water with fennel and onions studded with cloves, boiled artichokes, boiled carrots, potatoes with their skins on, and hard-boiled eggs. He also says that small boiled octopus are often included, that the presentation is an important aspect of the dish, and that the ingredients used may be changed at will. Other ingredients may include beetroot, raw or cooked sweet peppers, boiled white fish, chick-pea salad, florets of cauliflower, boiled navets (young turnips) and fresh tomatoes.

If meat such as boiled chicken, or boiled beef taken from the pot-au-feu, is included, the dish becomes a grand aïoli. This is traditionally served on Christmas Eve and on Fridays.

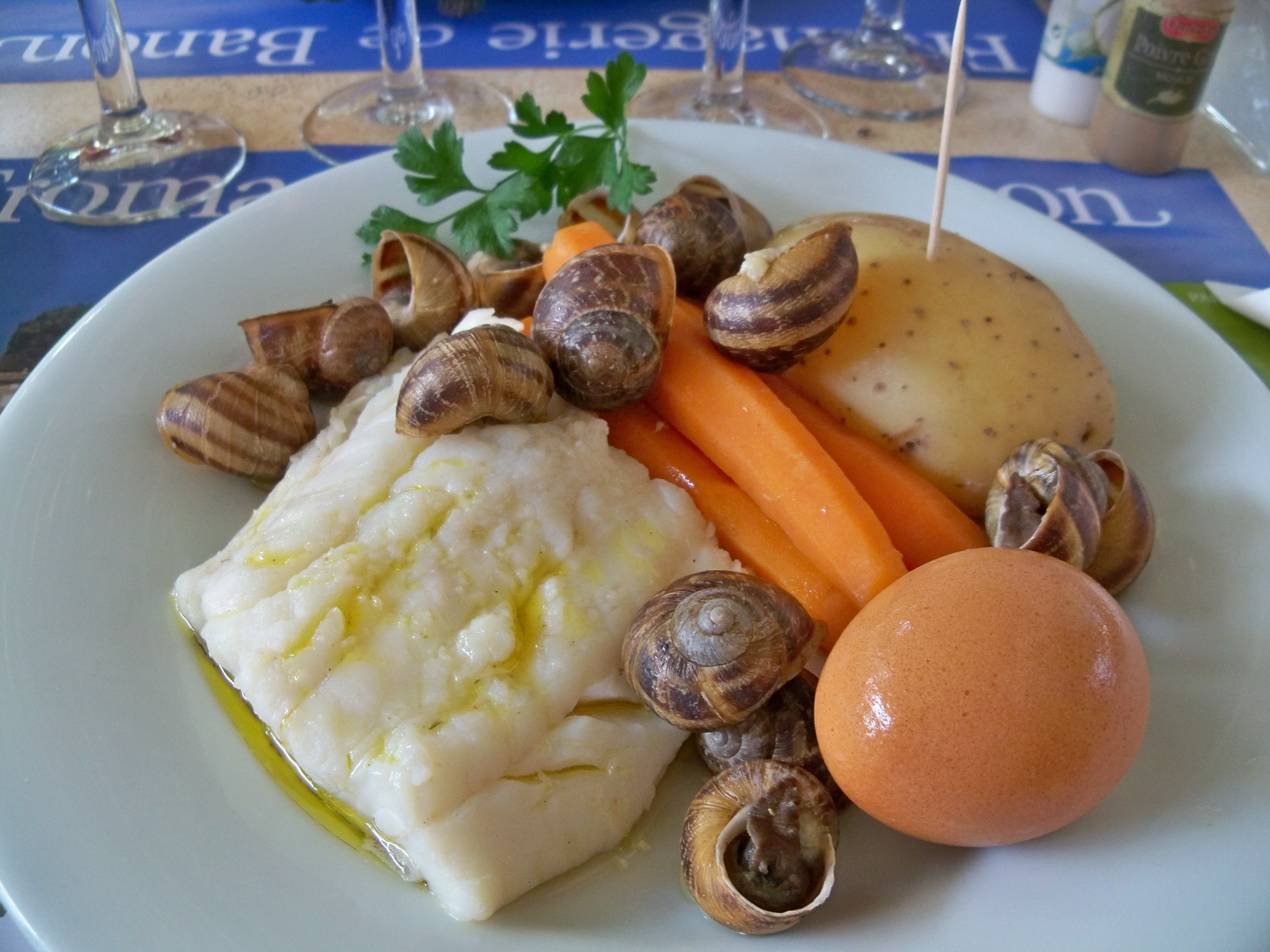
At a bistrot in Oppède

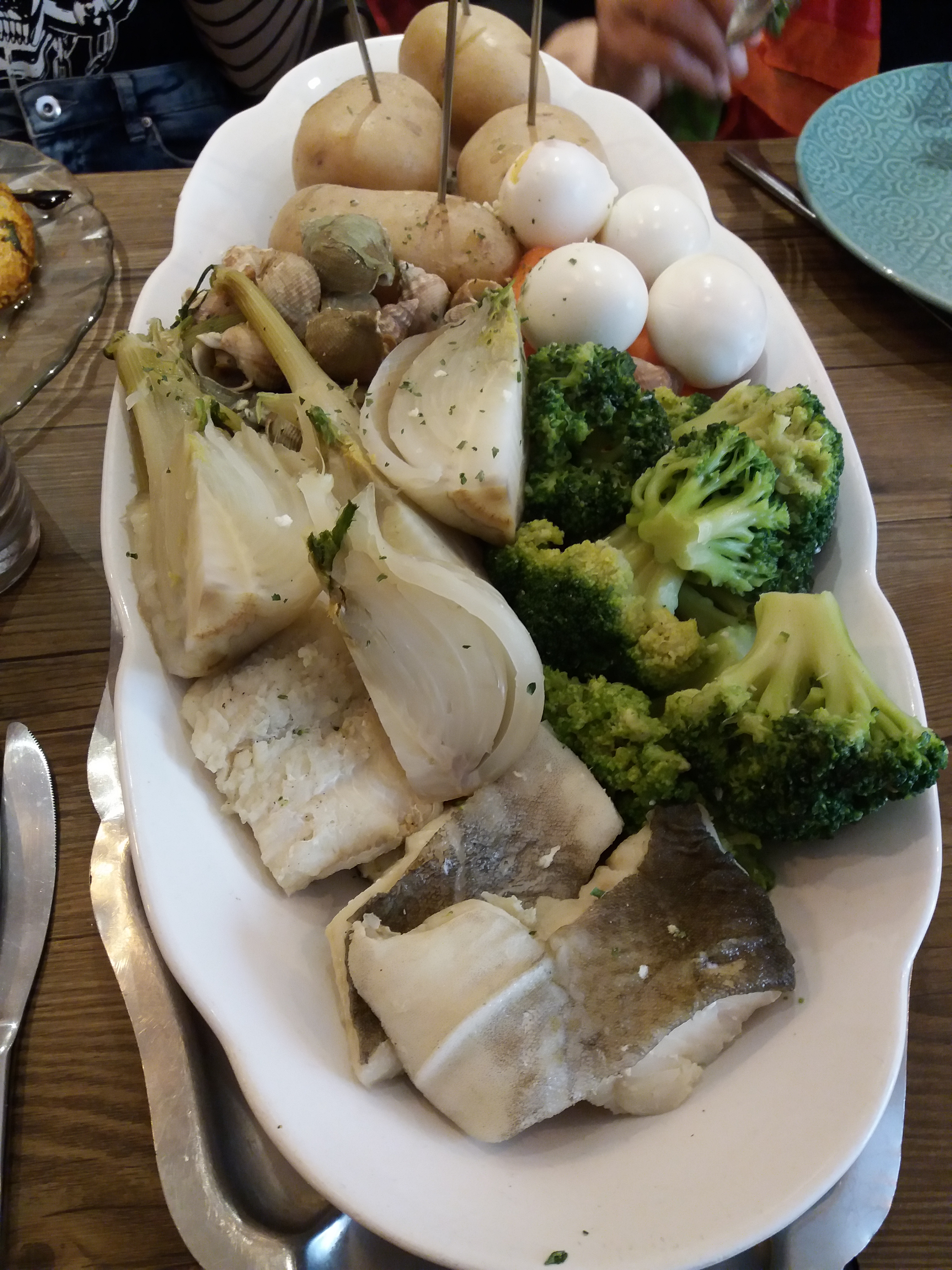
At a restaurant in Arles

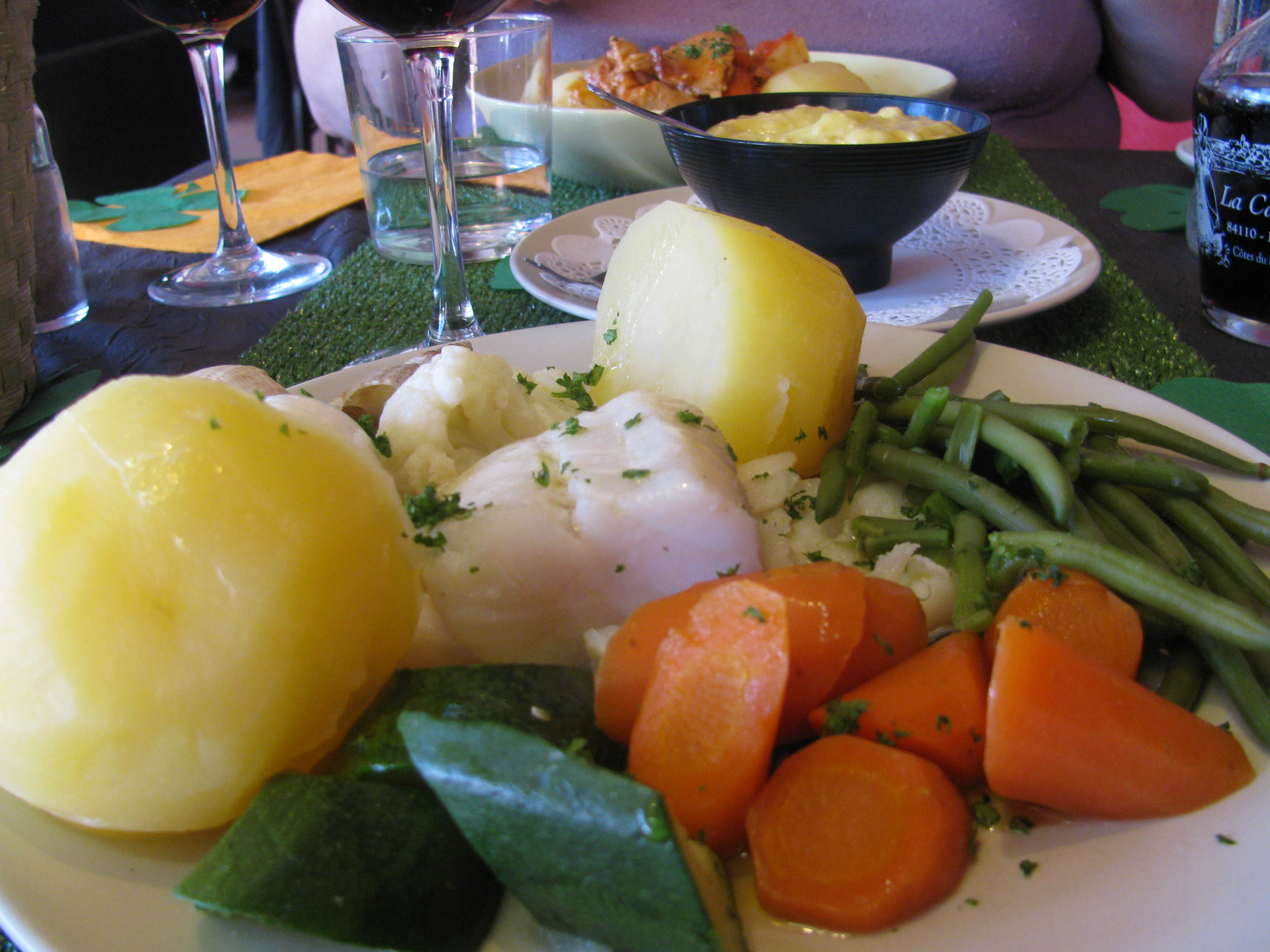
In Provence
