= Cuisine of Provence =

French cuisine

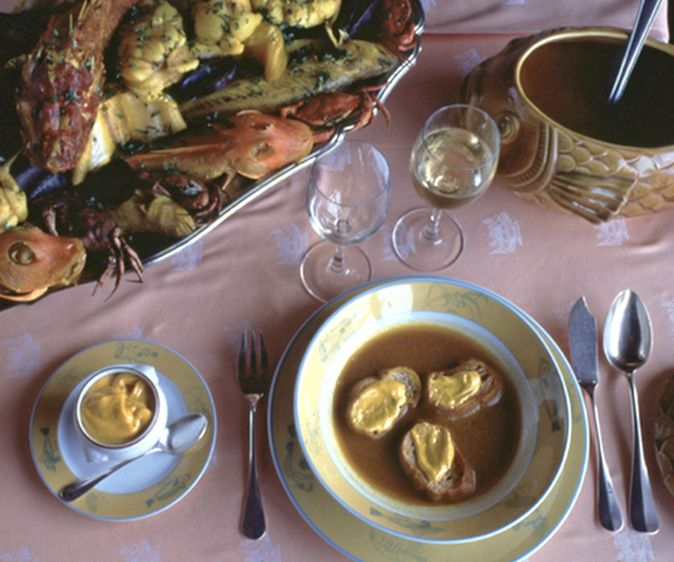
Bouillabaisse from Marseille, soup and fish served separately

The cooking of Provence is based around fresh, local produce including garlic, olive oil, tomatoes, fish, vegetables, fruit, and goat's cheese. Meat and poultry also feature, but are generally of secondary importance.

The cuisine of Provence is long established but has changed considerably over the centuries. Traditional rural life depended on three major crops – wheat, grapes and olives – which, with sheep farming, together with a variety of other local products such as almonds and herbs, sustained an agricultural economy of small farms. Although this traditional polyculture has largely disappeared, replaced by modern, large-scale agriculture, Provence remains, in the words of the Michelin Guide, "the garden of France".

With a sunny climate and suitable soil, Provence produces a wide diversity of vegetables and fruits throughout the year, providing the basis for a varied and seasonal cuisine. The Michelin Guide lists as Provençal specialities strawberries from Carpentras, cherries from Venasque, melons from Cavaillon; figs from Caromb, potatoes from Pertuis, garlic from Piolenc and asparagus, tomatoes, peaches and apricots from all over Provence. Other prominent ingredients in Provençal cooking include aubergines, courgettes, grapes, mushrooms, olives, parsley, peppers, and saffron. Along the Mediterranean coast of Provence there is plentiful fish and other seafood, including anchovies, bass, crayfish, dab, eel, grey mullet, octopus, red mullet, sardines, sea bream, skate, sole, spider crab, squid and tuna.

In The Oxford Companion to Food, Alan Davidson comments, "it is fairly safe to assume that à la provençale portends the presence of tomato and garlic". Provence's eponymous sauce provençale consists of tomatoes concassées (skinned and deseeded), tossed in boiling oil with chopped parsley and garlic, mixed with sliced fried mushrooms and tomato sauce.

Other dishes described as à la provençale include:

Dish	Contents	Ref
Alouette à la provençale	Larks lightly roasted, then quartered and sautéed with mushrooms, blanched pitted olives, tomatoes concassées with garlic, a little white wine poured on top, and finished in oven.	
Anguille à la provençale	Eel, sliced and sautéed with onions, with sauce made from tomato concasse, herbs, garlic and white wine.	
Aubergine à la provençale	Aubergines split in halves and fried; flesh scooped out, chopped, mixed with chopped tomatoes, onions and mushrooms, replaced in skins, sprinkled with breadcrumbs and baked in the oven.	
Brochets à la provençale	Fillets of pike, poached, with a reduction of tomatoes, parsley, garlic, shallots, mushrooms and cooking liquor.	
Cèpes à la provençale	Cèpes sliced, sautéed in hot oil with chopped shallots, parsley and garlic.	
Cervelles de veau à la provençale	Calf's brains, blanched and marinated in seasoned olive oil, cooked in slices in white wine, garnished with pitted olives and served with mayonnaise.	
Coquilles Saint-Jacques à la provençale	Scallops with garlic, cooked in a sauce of white wine, onions, tomatoes and parsley.	
Côtelette de mouton à la provençale	Mutton chop: one side sautéed in oil, and coated with thick béchamel mixed with garlic purée and egg yolk, sprinkled with breadcrumbs and finished in oven, a grilled mushroom cap filled with a stuffed olive on each cutlet, bordered with Provençal sauce.	
Côtelette de veau à la provençale	Veal chop: one side sautéed in oil and coated with béchamel mixed with egg yolks and pounded garlic, sprinkled with grated Parmesan, melted butter dropped on top, cooked and glazed in oven, Provençal sauce poured around.	
Culotte de bœuf à la provençale	Beef rump braised in white wine and brown stock with tomatoes and garlic; garnished with mushroom caps stuffed with duxelless flavoured with garlic and small fried tomatoes; Provençal sauce blended with the strained reduced braising stock served separately.	
Daube à la provençale	Small pieces of beef marinated in oil, white wine, brandy, herbs and chopped onions; browned in oil, diced bacon, diced tomatoes, pitted olives, mushrooms and garlic added. Braised in oven.	
Foie de veau sautés à la Provençale	Calf's liver, sautéed in oil and butter, served with a sauce of tomatoes, garlic and parsley.	
Haricots verts sautés à la Provençale	French beans cooked in water and then browned in a frying pan in olive oil. Garlic and parsley are added at the last moment.	
Lapin à la provençale	Rabbit fried, in oil, taken out of pan, pan deglazed with white wine, chopped peeled tomatoes, garlic, chopped anchovies, sweet basil and pitted olives. Cooked and poured over the fillet.	
Lotte à la provençale	Monkfish with chopped onions and tomatoes with parsley, garlic and saffron, cooked in white wine and water.	
Morue salée à la provençale	Salt cod simmered with chopped onions and diced tomatoes, capers, black olives, garlic and chopped parsley.	
Œufs au plat à la provençale	Fried eggs served on halved tomatoes, sprinkled with chopped parsley and garlic.	
Œufs brouilles à la provençale	Scrambled eggs mixed with diced tomatoes, garlic and chopped parsley.	
Ombre écailles à la provençale	Grayling scored on both sides, fried in oil with diced tomatoes and garlic.	
Omelette à la provençale	Omelette stuffed with large cubes of tomatoes, simmered in oil, mixed with crushed garlic and chopped parsley.	
Perdrix à la provençale	Partridge cut in pieces, browned in oil, simmered with diced tomatoes, crushed garlic, diced artichoke bottoms and eggplants, sautéed beforehand, and blanched black olives.	
Poulet à la provençale	Chicken pieces sautéed in oil and then covered with white wine and Provençale sauce flavoured with chopped balsamic vinegar, and pitted olives.	
Poulpe à la provençale	Octopus with chopped onions, seasoned with chopped onions, crushed garlic herbs and slowly simmered in white wine and water. Served with chopped parsley on top.	
Potiron à la provençale	Gratin of diced pumpkin with fried onions, sprinkled with grated cheese and baked.	
Purée d’olives à la provençale	Also known as tapenade. Olives with anchovies, capers thyme, bay leaves, garlic and mustard are strained, diluted with brandy and oil, seasoned with pepper and kept in stone jar for future use covered with oil. Spread for canapes or stuffing for leeks, tomatoes or olives.	
Raie à la provençale	Skate cut in pieces, pan-fried, covered with Provençal sauce, sprinkled with chopped parsley.	
Rouget à la provençale	Red mullet grilled, covered with browned butter, garnished with tomatoes concassées flavoured with garlic, anchovy fillets. Served topped with green olives.	
Sardines à la provençale	Sardines shallow fried in oil with crushed garlic, bay leaf and thyme; browned butter with a little vinegar and chopped herbs.	
Sole à la provençale	Dover sole poached in white wine and fish stock, covered with Provençal sauce, sprinkled with chopped parsley, garnished with tomatoes.	
Thon à la provençale	Tuna marinaded and tossed in oil with chopped tomatoes, garlic and onion, moistened with white wine and consommé, braised in oven, coated with reduced stock, mixed with capers and chopped parsley.	-
Thon en daube à la provençale	Marinated tuna slow-cooked with onions, tomatoes and garlic in white wine.	
Tomate à la provençale	Diced tomatoes sautéed in hot oil, served with chopped parsley, garlic, salt, pepper and a pinch of sugar.	
Tomates à la provençale	Tomatoes cut in halves, sprinkled with breadcrumbs mixed with chopped parsley and garlic, oil dropped on top, baked in oven.	
Tripe à la provençale	Tripe with sliced onions and chopped salt pork sweated in oil, dredged with flour, lightly browned, moistened with stock and boiled; tripe cut in strips, the sauce poured over and cooked until done; sauce bound with egg yolks and finished off with lemon juice, chopped parsley and sweet basil.	

== Other Provençal dishes ==
Provençal dishes and culinary specialities without the "à la provençale" tag include:

Dish	Contents	Ref
Aioli	A garlic mayonnaise. In his Mets et produits de Provence (1927), Eugène Blancard calls it the "triumph of the Provençal kitchen". It frequently accompanies potatoes, beetroot, fish and other seafood, and boiled salt cod.	
Bouillabaisse	The classic fish dish of Marseille. It is somewhere between a soup and a stew. There is no standard recipe, and these are among the fish likely to be included: rascasse, baudroie (angler fish), vive (weever fish), galinette (sea hen), merlan (whiting) and langouste (crayfish). Other fish that may be included are conger eel, crabs, gurnard, monkfish, mussels, red mullet, sea bass, sole, spider crabs and turbot.	
Brandade de morue	A thick purée of salt cod, olive oil, milk, and garlic, usually spread on toast. It originated in the neighbouring region of Languedoc.	
Escabeche	Fish (usually sardines) are either poached or fried after being marinated overnight in vinegar or citrus juice. This is another non-native dish, known in Italy as scapece and in Algeria as scabetch.	
Fougasse	The traditional bread of Provence, round and flat. Its name derives from the same Latin name as the Italian focaccia.	
Oursinade	A sauce made from the corals (reproductive organs) of sea urchins, often served with fish.	
Navettes de Marseille	Dry biscuits with orange, lemon and sometimes lavender flavouring.	
Pissaladière	A speciality from Nice, in the neighbouring Alpes-Maritimes department. Although it resembles a pizza, it is traditionally made with bread dough, and is topped with a bed of onions, lightly browned, tomato, and a paste, called pissalat, made from sardines and anchovies, and small black olives.	
Ratatouille	A traditional ragout of aubergine, tomatoes, courgettes and sweet peppers, similar to the older Catalan samfaina.	
Rouille	A mayonnaise with red peppers or paprika thick in consistency because bread is a major ingredient, often added to fish soups including bouillabaisse.	
Soupe au pistou	Vegetable soup served either cold or hot, served with pistou, the local version of Genoese pesto. The vegetables may vary, but squash or pumpkin, some root vegetables, and beans are always used.	
Calisson	A traditional confection of Aix-en-Provence, a soft, iced marzipan-like confection of almonds and candied fruit.	
Gâteau des Rois	A type of Epiphany cake found all over France; the Provençal version is different because it is made of brioche in a ring, flavoured with the essence of orange flowers and covered with sugar and fruit confit.	
Tarte Tropézienne	A tart of crème pâtissière, invented by a Saint-Tropez pastry chef named Alexandre Micka in the 1950s.	
Les treize desserts	An old Christmas tradition in Provence. Thirteen desserts are served after Christmas Eve dinner, traditionally representing Jesus and His twelve Apostles. Each guest must eat all thirteen to guarantee good luck for the year ahead.	
Herbes de Provence	Provençal herbs are a mixture of dried herbs commonly used in Provençal cooking, containing some or all of basil, fennel seed, lavender, marjoram, oregano, parsley, rosemary, savory, tarragon and thyme.	

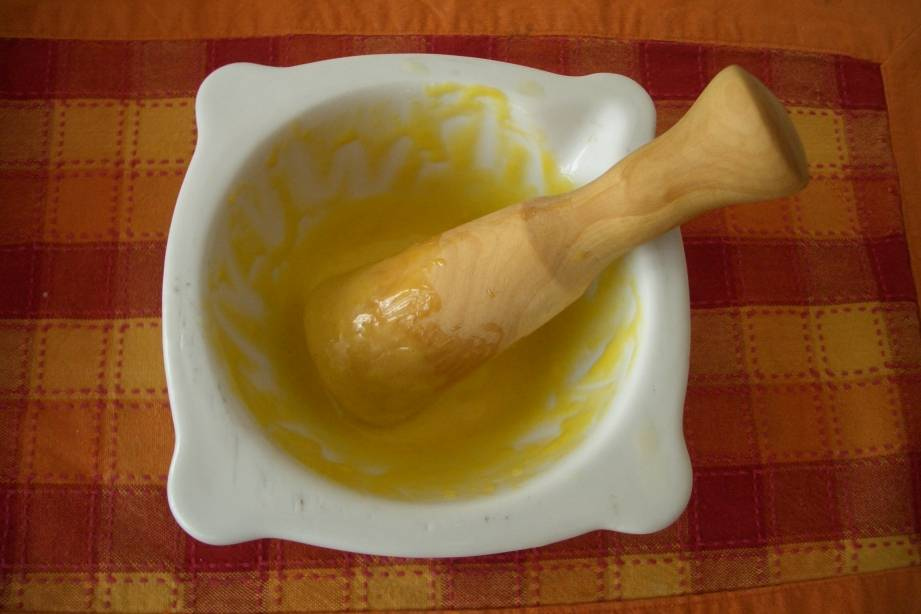
Aioli made of garlic, salt, egg yolk and olive oil

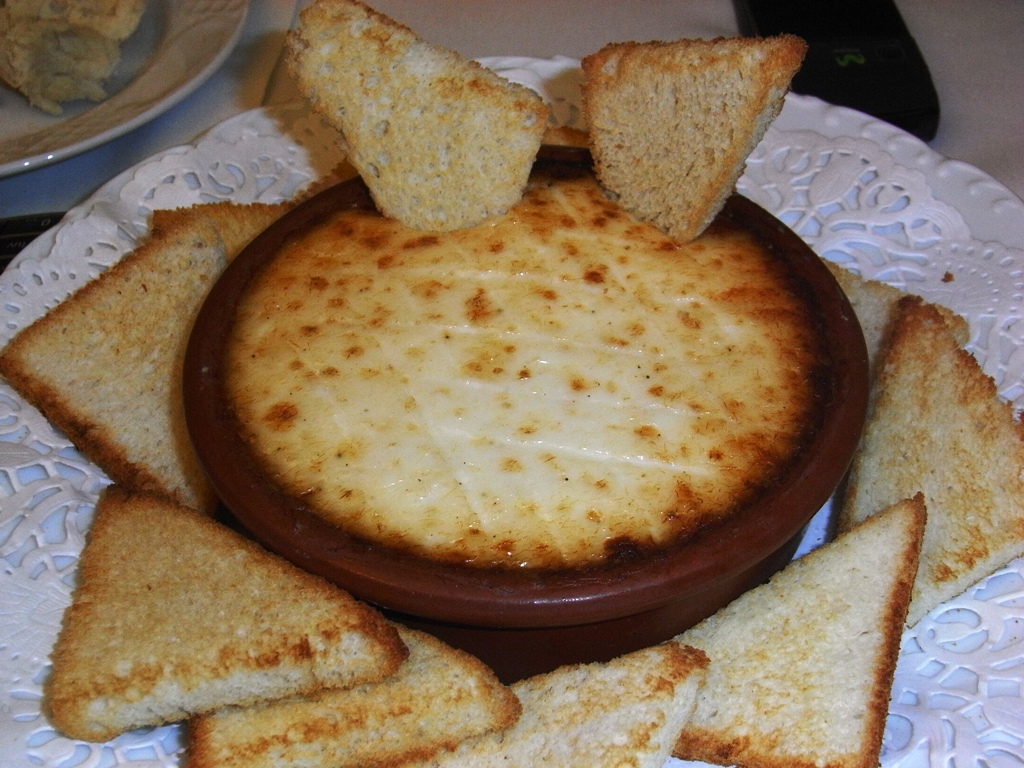
Brandade de morue, salt cod and olive oil mashed with potatoes or bread

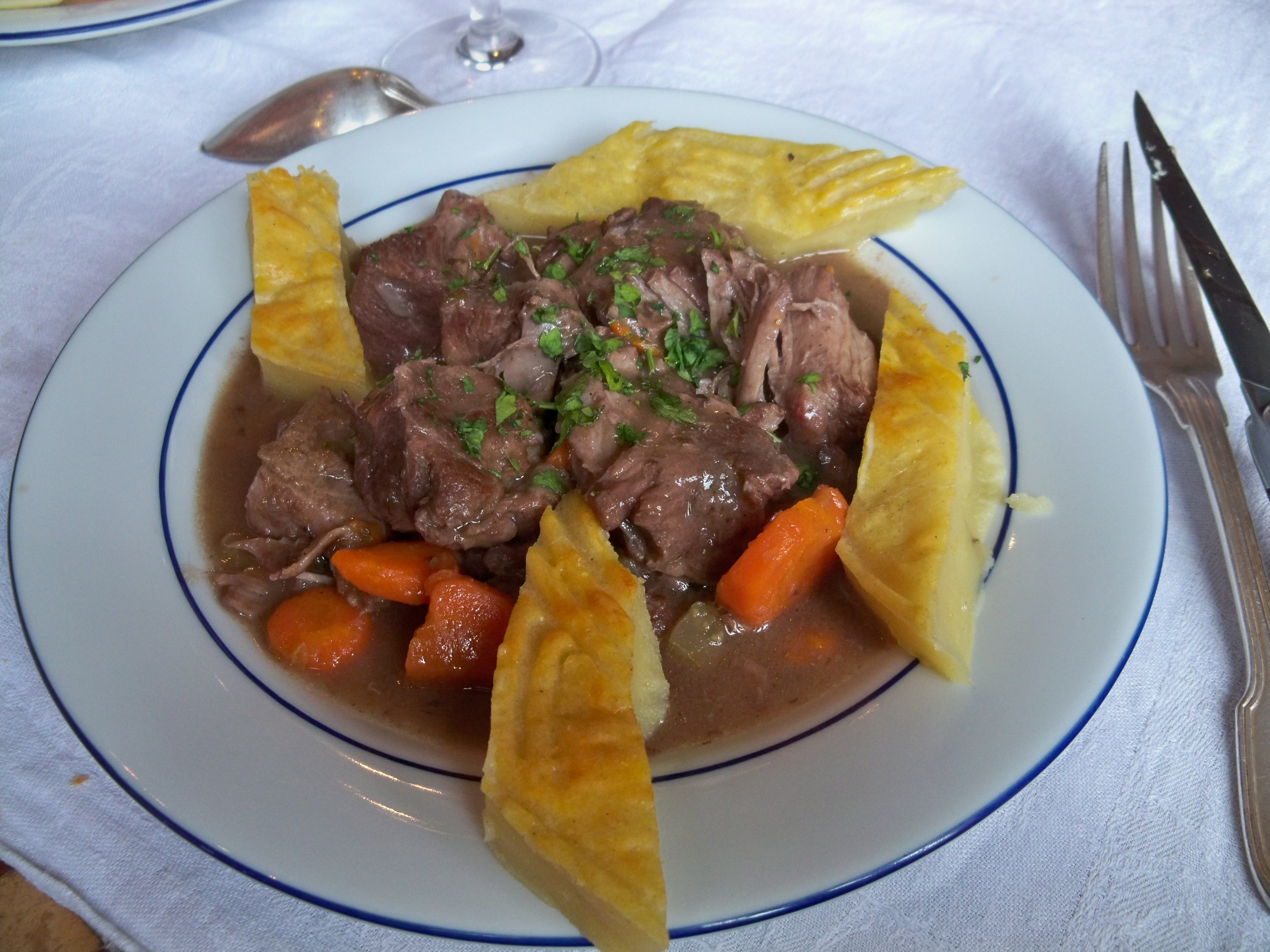
Daube, Provençal beef stew, cooked in wine

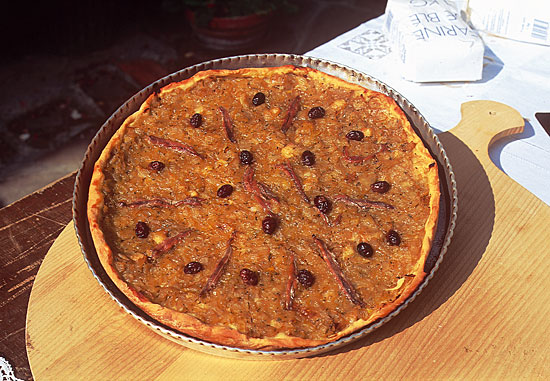
Pissaladière

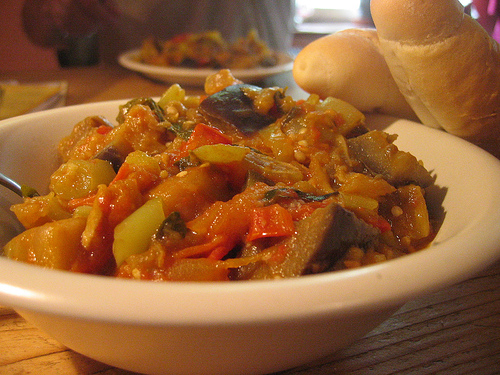
Ratatouille with bread

== Sources ==
- Beullac, Geneviève, ed. (2001). Larousse Gastronomique. New York: Clarkson Potter. ISBN 978-0-60-960971-2.
- Bickel, Walter (1989). Hering's Dictionary of Classical and Modern Cookery (eleventh ed.). London: Virtue. ISBN 978-3-8057-0307-9.
- David, Elizabeth (1999) [1950, 1951, 1955]. Elizabeth David Classics – Mediterranean Food; French Country Cooking; Summer Food (second ed.). London: Grub Street. ISBN 1-902304-27-6.
- David, Elizabeth (2008) [1960]. French Provincial Cooking. London: Folio Society. OCLC 809349711.
- Davidson, Alan (1999). The Oxford Companion to Food. Oxford: Oxford University Press. ISBN 978-0-19-211579-9.
- Escoffier, Auguste (1934). Ma Cuisine (in French). Paris: Flammarion. OCLC 981486233.
- Friedman, Sophie, ed. (2017). The Green Guide: Provence. Paris: Michelin. ISBN 978-2-06-721609-9.
- Kimber, Edd (2015). Patisserie Made Simple: From Macarons to Millefeuille and More. London: Kyle Books. ISBN 978-1-90-948734-5.
- Norman, Jill (1997). The Classic Herb Cookbook. London and New York: Dorling Kindersley. ISBN 978-0-78-941446-5.
- Olney, Richard (1985). The French Menu Cookbook. Boston: D. R. Godine. ISBN 978-0-87-923579-6.
- Pastier, Minouche (1995). Cuisine provençale (in French). Paris: Hachette. ISBN 978-2-01-625130-0.
- Saulnier, Louis (1978) [1923]. Le Répertoire de la cuisine (fourteenth ed.). London: Jaeggi. OCLC 1086737491.
- Willan, Anne (2007). The Country Cooking of France. San Francisco: Chronicle Books. ISBN 978-0-81-184646-2.
