= Gurnard =

Gurnard may refer to:

== Fish ==
- Fish of the family Triglidae
- Flying gurnards, fish of the family Dactylopteridae

== Other ==
- Gurnard, Isle of Wight, a village on the Isle of Wight in the British Isles, on
  - Gurnard Bay
- USS Gurnard (SS-254), a United States Navy submarine of the Gato class
- USS Gurnard (SSN-662), a United States Navy nuclear fast attack submarine of the Sturgeon Class
- Short Gurnard, a fighter biplane
