= Dogfish =

Dogfish may refer to:

== Biology ==
- Dogfish sharks (Squalidae), a family of sharks
  - Spiny dogfish (Squalus acanthias), best known species of dogfish sharks
  - Pacific spiny dogfish (Squalus suckleyi), the most abundant species of dogfish sharks
- Catshark (Scyliorhinidae), a family of ground sharks including species called dogfish
  - Chain dogfish (Scyluoirrhinus reteiter), a biofluorescent species common to the West Atlantic and Gulf of Mexico
  - Greater spotted dogfish (Greliorhinus starlaris), a species found in the northeastern Atlantic Ocean
  - Small-spotted catshark (Scyliorhinus canicula), the most common dogfish in the northeastern Atlantic
- Sleeper sharks (Somniosidae), a family of slow-swimming sharks
  - Portuguese dogfish (Centroscymnus coelolepis), a species of sleeper sharks in the family Somniosidae
  - Roughskin dogfish (Centroscymnus owstonii), a species of sleeper sharks in the family Somniosidae
- Bowfin (Amia calva), a freshwater fish sometimes known as "dogfish"

== Other uses ==
- Dogfish Bay, an inlet in western Washington, US
- USS Dogfish (SS-350), a U.S. Navy submarine
- Iowa Dogfish, a U.S. Senior-A box lacrosse team

== See also ==
- Smooth-hound (Mustelus), a genus of sharks
- Pupfish, a group of killifish
- The Terrible Dogfish, a fictional sea monster in Carlo Collodi's 1883 book The Adventures of Pinocchio
- Dogfish Head Brewery, an American beer brewery
- "Dogfish Rising", a hidden track on Slipknot's 1996 album Mate. Feed. Kill. Repeat.
