= Calf's liver in French cuisine =

Calf's liver (in French foie de veau) is an important ingredient in the cookery of France. One French authority has called it "the tastiest of all butcher's livers, mainly sliced thin, coated with flour, fried in butter and kept rare". Some of the numerous ways of cooking and serving it are set out in the table below.

== Names and methods ==
Name	English	Method	Ref
Américaine, à l'	American style	Sliced, fried in butter, served with sliced fried bacon and fried tomatoes.	
Anglaise, à l'	English style	Sliced, fried in butter, served with rashers of fried or grilled bacon. May be sprinkled with chopped parsley and/or have browned butter poured over. See Calf's liver and bacon.	
Bananes, aux	With bananas	Sliced, fried in butter, each slice covered with half a banana divided lengthwise, floured and fried in butter with lemon juice. Served with browned butter on top.	
Bercy	Bercy	Sliced, floured, dipped in melted butter and broiled, covered with sauce Bercy.	
Berlinoise, à la	Berlin style	Sliced, floured, fried in butter, garnished with fried apple and onion rings; browned butter poured on top.	
Bordelaise, à la (i)	Bordeaux style	Flash-fried slices of Bayonne ham served with fried slices of calf's liver. Served with bordelaise sauce.	
Bordelaise, à la (ii)	Bordeaux style	Whole, larded, fried in butter, wrapped in pig's caul (which covers the kidney or liver) with onions, shallots, mushrooms, moistened with white wine and demi-glace, braised in the oven, garnished with sautéed cèpes.	
Bourgeoise, à la	Citizen style	Whole, skinned, larded, braised in demi-glace, garnished with glazed button onions and small carrots sautéed in butter.	
Bourguignonne, à la	Burgundy style	Fried in very hot butter over a high heat. Served with a sauce made by deglazing the pan with red wine and stock in equal proportions. Bourguignonne garnish is added (sautéed mushrooms, pearl onions, and bacon lardons).	
Brochette, en	Skewered	Liver cut in squares, with mushrooms, and salted pork, covered with duxelles, egg and breadcrumbs, grilled, served with either mushroom sauce or beurre maître d'hôtel.	
Campagnarde	Rustic style	Fried with finely chopped mushrooms and herbs, including chives, tarragon and parsley.	
Crépine, en	In pig's caul	Whole liver, skinned, larded, wrapped in pig's caul, braised in white wine, white stock and sour cream with chopped onions.	
Créole, à la	Creole style	Marinated in oil and then fried with onions, parsley, tomato purée and white wine.	
Espagnole	Spanish style	Seasoned calf's liver, floured and sautéed. Served on tomatoes softened in olive oil and seasoned with garlic. Garnished with fried onion rings and fried curly parsley.	
Fines-herbes	With herbs	Cut in slices, fried in butter, served with parsley sauce.	
Florentine, à la	Florence style	Flash fried and served with braised spinach and battered and deep-fried onion rings.	
Frite	Fried	Seasoned, rolled in flour, dipped in egg and breadcrumbs, fried in butter, served with fried parsley.	
Haché de foie de veau	Hashed	Cooked in white stock, minced, mixed with chopped onions simmered in butter and chopped parsley, and served with a poached egg on top.	
Italienne	Italian style	In slices fried in oil, served with mushroom and ham sauce.	
Jutlandaise, à la	Jutland style	Whole, larded, browned in goose fat, simmered in light beer with sliced root vegetables, peppercorns and a bay leaf.	
Lyonnaise, à la	Lyonnaise style	Sliced, fried in butter and oil, garnished with sliced fried onions, and served with a sprinkle of vinegar.	
Milanaise, à la	Milanese style	Sliced, fried in oil, served on macaroni, with tomato sauce served separately.	
Moissonneuse, à la	Harvester style	Fried slices placed on green peas mixed with slices of boiled potatoes and diced fried bacon.	
Moutarde, à la	With mustard	Briefly fried and then rolled in mustard, herbs and breadcrumbs, and grilled.	
Orientale, à l'	Oriental style	Sliced, fried in oil. The residue in frying pan is deglazed with vinegar and sugar, boiled up with demi-glace with soaked raisins added.	
Pain de foie de veau	Patty	Puréed raw liver with green bacon, bread soaked in cream, chopped onions sweated in butter and whole eggs. Rubbed through a sieve, egg whites and cream added, poached in a bain marie and serviced with brown sauce.	
Papillote, en	In paper	Sliced, marinated in oil, lemon juice, chopped shallots, seasoned, placed on a small slice of ham and covered with a slice of bacon, wrapped in paper and roasted in oven.	
Provençale, à la	Provençal style	Sliced, fried, covered with Provençale sauce (similar to salsa).	
Quenelles alsacienne	Alsatian dumplings	Chicken liver and calf's liver, chopped fine and mixed with cooked onion, parsley and eggs, shaped with two spoons spoon, poached. Served with maître d'hôtel butter.	
Quenelles de foie de veau à la viennoise	Viennese dumplings	Raw liver, chopped, rubbed through a sieve, white breadcrumbs, flour, chopped onions lightly fried in butter, chopped parsley, whole eggs and egg yolk and seasoning added, dumplings shaped with two spoons, poached in white stock, served with lemon juice and browned butter poured on top.	
Raisins, aux	With raisins	Sliced and fried in butter, sprinkled with raisins or sultanas and covered with a sauce made from deglazing the frying pan with vinegar, sugar and demi-glace.	
Rizotto, aux	With risotto	Diced, sautéed rapidly in butter, put in the centre of a risotto on a flat baking dish, covered with Mornay sauce, sprinkled with grated cheese and gratinéed rapidly.	
Sauce aigre, à la	In sour sauce	Sliced, fried, served with a sauce made from deglazing the frying pan with vinegar and demi-glace.	
Sauce au vin rouge, à la	With red wine sauce	Sliced, fried, covered with Bordelaise sauce mixed with fried diced bacon.	
Schweizer Leberspiessli	Swiss liver skewers	Square pieces of sliced liver and bacon fixed on a skewer, brushed with melted butter, seasoned, sprinkled with chopped sage, wrapped in pig's caul, dipped in melted butter and broiled.	
Soufflé de foie de veau	Soufflé of calf's liver	Cooked in stock, puréed with Béchamel sauce and butter, rubbed through a sieve, mixed with cream, egg yolks and stiffly beaten egg whites, in greased soufflé dish, baked in oven in a soufflé dish.	
Sous la cendre	Under cinders	Larded, covered with duxelles, wrapped in a paste similar to that of coulibiac cooked in the oven and served with Madeira sauce.	
Turinoise, à la	Turin style	Sliced, fried, served on risotto, covered with browned butter.	

== Sources ==
- Beck, Simone; Louisette Bertholle; Julia Child (2012) [1961]. Mastering the Art of French Cooking, Volume One. London: Particular. ISBN 978-0-241-95339-6.
- Beullac, Geneviève, ed. (2001). Larousse Gastronomique. New York: Clarkson Potter. ISBN 978-0-60-960971-2.
- Bickel, Walter (1989). Hering's Dictionary of Classical and Modern Cookery (eleventh ed.). London: Virtue. ISBN 978-3-8057-0307-9.
- David, Elizabeth (2008) [1960]. French Provincial Cooking. London: Folio Society. OCLC 809349711.
- Montagné, Prosper (1976). Larousse Gastronomique. London: Hamlyn. OCLC 1285641881.
- Saulnier, Louis (1978) [1923]. Le Répertoire de la cuisine (fourteenth ed.). London: Jaeggi. OCLC 1086737491.
