= Kakavia (soup) =

Fish soup from Greece

Kakavia (Greek: κακαβιά) is a Greek fish soup.

Its name comes from the kakavi, the tripod cooking pot used by ancient Ionian fishermen. Kakavia has been described as "the most ancient of Greek fish soups", and related in lineage to the French bouillabaisse; like that stew, kakavia is made with a flexible variety of fish and is associated with fishing villages.

It was traditionally made from the smallest fish caught by fishermen, along with olive oil, onions, and saffron.

One modern recipe calls for filleted and chunked whitefish (such as cod, goliath grouper, or snapper), prawns, fish or vegetable stock, tomatoes, onions, potatoes, olive oil, lemon juice, and a garnish of flatleaf (Italian) parsley. Another calls for three or four kinds of fish cleaned and sliced for poaching (bass, cod, hake, haddock, halibut, trout, pollock, snapper, rockfish, whiting), plus shrimp and perhaps lobster or scallops, along with onions, scallions, or leeks; olive oil; tomato; stalk fennel or celery; fresh parsley; fresh thyme; bay leaf; ground black pepper; white wine and water; and toasted croutons.

Kakavia is similar to other types of Mediterranean fish stew, such as the French bouillabaisse, Italian cacciucco, Spanish zarzuela, and Portuguese caldeirada.

== See also ==
- Ancient Greek cuisine
- List of fish dishes
- List of soups
