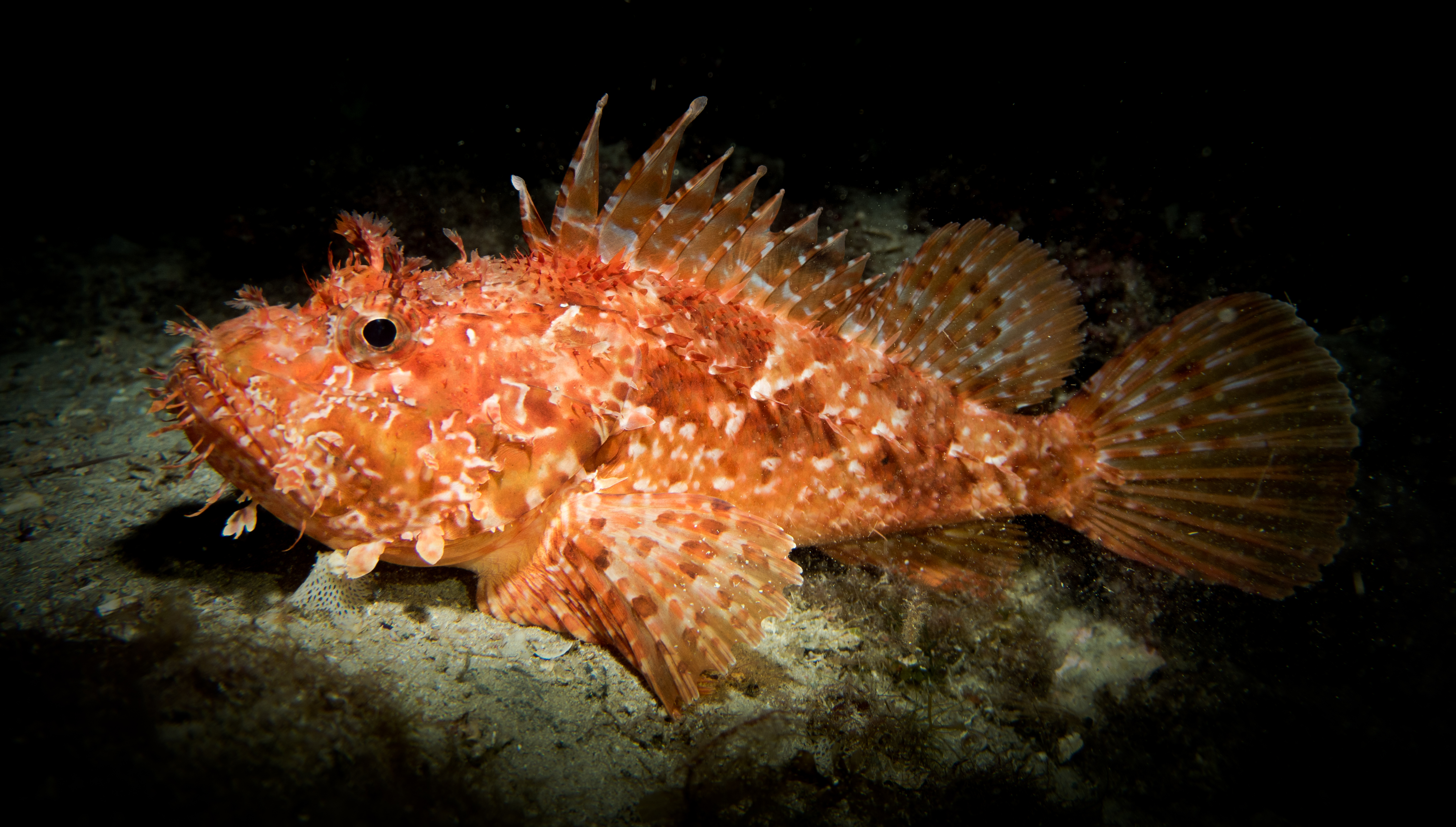

Conservation status
- Least Concern (IUCN 3.1)

Scientific classification
- Kingdom: Animalia
- Phylum: Chordata
- Class: Actinopterygii
- Division: Teleostei
- Order: Perciformes
- Family: Scorpaenidae
- Genus: Scorpaena
- Species: S. scrofa

Binomial name
- Scorpaena scrofa Linnaeus, 1758

Synonyms
- Scorpaena lutea Risso, 1810; Scorpaena natalensis Regan, 1906; Scorpaenopsis natalensis (Regan, 1906)

= Scorpaena scrofa =

Species of fish

Scorpaena scrofa, the red scorpionfish, bigscale scorpionfish, large-scaled scorpion fish, or rascasse is a venomous marine species of ray-finned fish in the family Scorpaenidae, the scorpionfishes. It is found in the Mediterranean Sea, in the eastern Atlantic Ocean and the western Indian Ocean.

== Taxonomy ==
Scorpaena scrofa was first formally described in 1758 by Carl Linnaeus in the 10th edition of his Systema Naturae in which he gave the type localities as the Mediterranean Sea at Rome and Marseille. The specific name scrofa means "a breeding sow" in Latin, presumed to derive from scrofano and scrofanello, which are Italian names for the black scorpionfish (S. porcus) and this species, similar to the Old English "hogfish", possible an allusion to Renaissance mistranslations of Athenaeus' observation that scorpionfishes fed on algae or weed, that led to the belief that these fishes live and feed on mud.

== Description ==
Scorpaena scrofa is the largest eastern Atlantic scorpion fish. Its colouration ranges from brick red to a light pink, and it has dark-coloured blotches on its body. It has venomous spines, and can achieve a maximum weight around 3 kg (6.6 lb). It can grow to a maximum length of 50 cm (20 in), but is commonly around 30 cm (12 in).

It has 12 dorsal spines, 9 dorsal soft rays, three anal spines, and five soft rays. It often has a dark spot on its spinous dorsal spines between the 6th and 11th. It has long supraorbital tentacles.

== Distribution ==
Scorpaena scrofa is found in the Mediterranean Sea. It is also found in the eastern Atlantic Ocean around the British Isles, where it is rare, south to Senegal, the Canary Islands, and Cape Verde. It is also found in the Azores Island of São Miguel; It is also found from Namibia south and east along the coast of South Africa into the western Indian Ocean, its otherwise circum-African distribution is interrupted between Guinea and Namibia where it is apparently replaced by the spotted-fin scorpionfish (S. stephanica). In the Indian Ocean the northern most record is from the Gulf of Aqaba and, given its occurrence elsewhere in the western Indian Ocean, it is thought that this record is unlikely to be the result of anti-Lessepsian migration from the Mediterranean through the Suez Canal.

== Habitat ==
Scorpaena scrofa is demersal and lives in marine and brackish environments with rocky, sandy, or muddy bottoms at depths of 20–500 m (66–1,640 ft). By day, it lives in burrows and caves. At night it comes out to hunt.

== Behaviour ==
Scorpaena scrofa is a sedentary, solitary, and nonmigratory fish. It is predatory, feeding on other fish, as well as crustaceans and molluscs. This is one of the fish used by the marine leech Pontobdella muricata as a host.

== As food ==
Scorpaena scrofa is a traditional ingredient in Marseille bouillabaisse and in Tuscan cacciucco. It is also widely used in Japanese cuisine. It has a sweet, delicate, and subtly briny flavor, often compared to lobster. Its texture is firm, flaky, and slightly gelatinous, falling perfectly between a meaty monkfish and a delicate sea bass.
