= Peen tong =

Chinese brown sugar

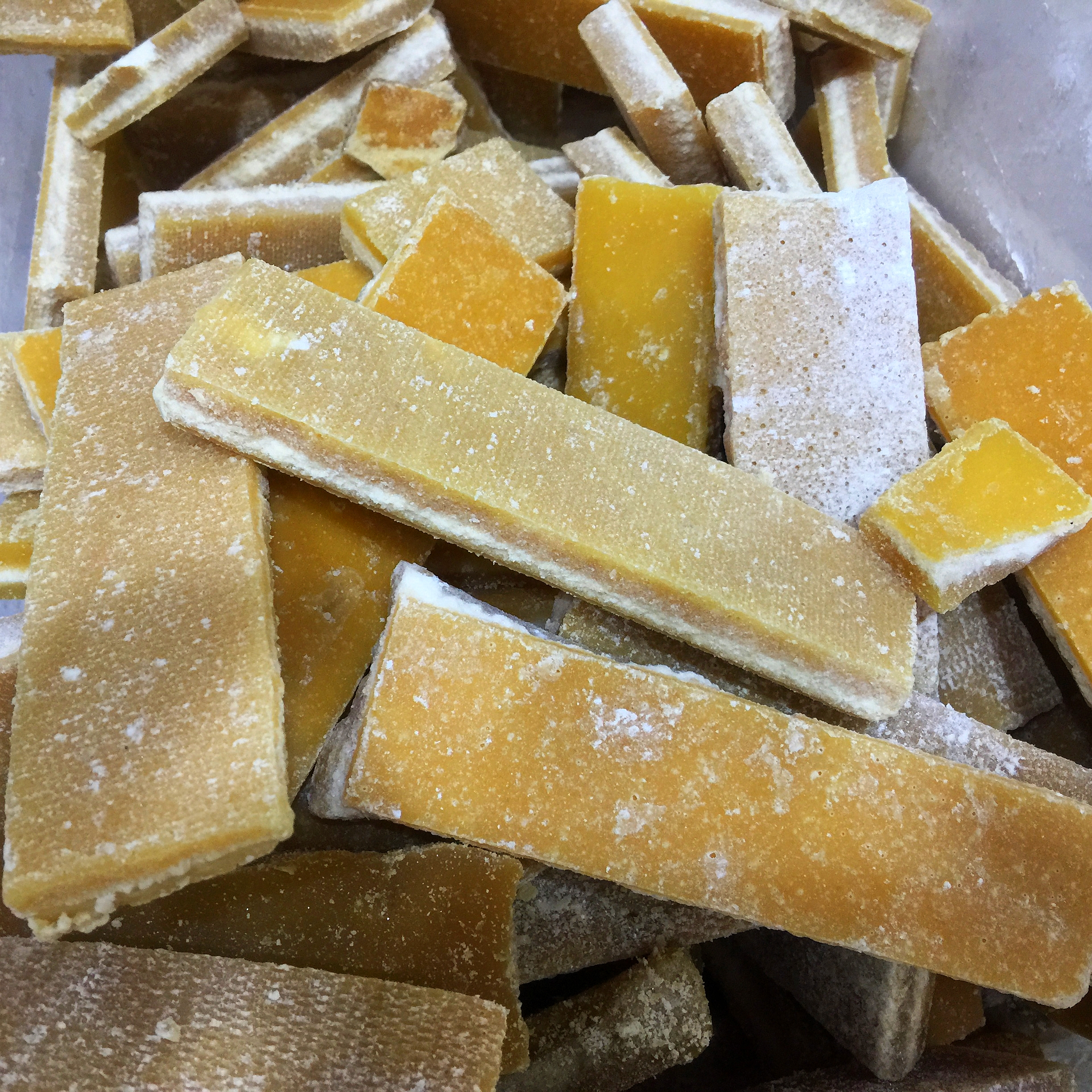
Peen tong at a supermarket in Haikou, Hainan, China

Peen tong or pian tang (Chinese: 片糖; pinyin: piàntáng; Cantonese Yale: pintòng; lit. 'slab sugar') and wong tong (Chinese: 黃糖; pinyin: huángtáng; Cantonese Yale: wòngtòng; lit. 'yellow sugar'), is a Chinese brown sugar and sugar candy that is used in various Chinese desserts and also consumed alone as a snack. In China, it is sold in slab or brick form in one-pound packages, and occasionally as a bulk food item.

== Use in dishes ==
Peen tong is used as an ingredient in desserts, sauces and sweet soups. Peen tong is sometimes used as an ingredient in nian gao, whereby the slab of peen tong is scraped and the resultant shavings are used in the dish. Another method for its use in nian gao is to dissolve the peen tong in water, which is less time-consuming compared to scraping it. It is used as an ingredient in jiandui (Chinese: 煎堆; pinyin: jiānduī; Cantonese Yale: jīndēui), a sesame ball prepared using glutinous rice flour. Peen tong is also used in haptou wu (Chinese: 合桃糊; pinyin: hétáo hú; Jyutping: hap6 tou4 wu2; Cantonese Yale: hahptòu wú), a sweet Chinese walnut soup.

== See also ==
- Jaggery
- Panela
- Sugarloaf
