= Brown sugar =

Sucrose sugar product with a distinctive brown color

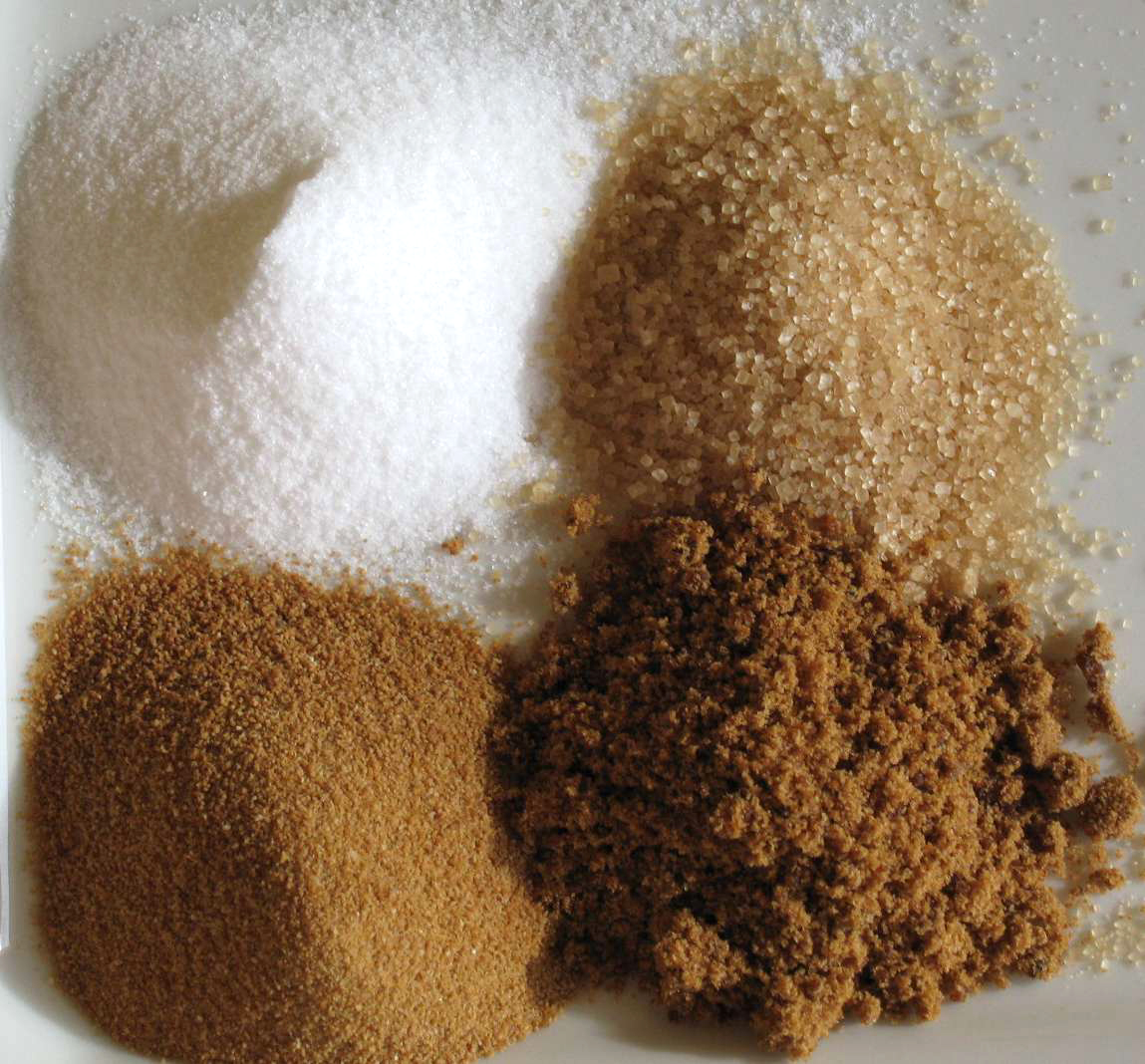
Clockwise from top left: White refined, unrefined, brown, and unprocessed cane sugars

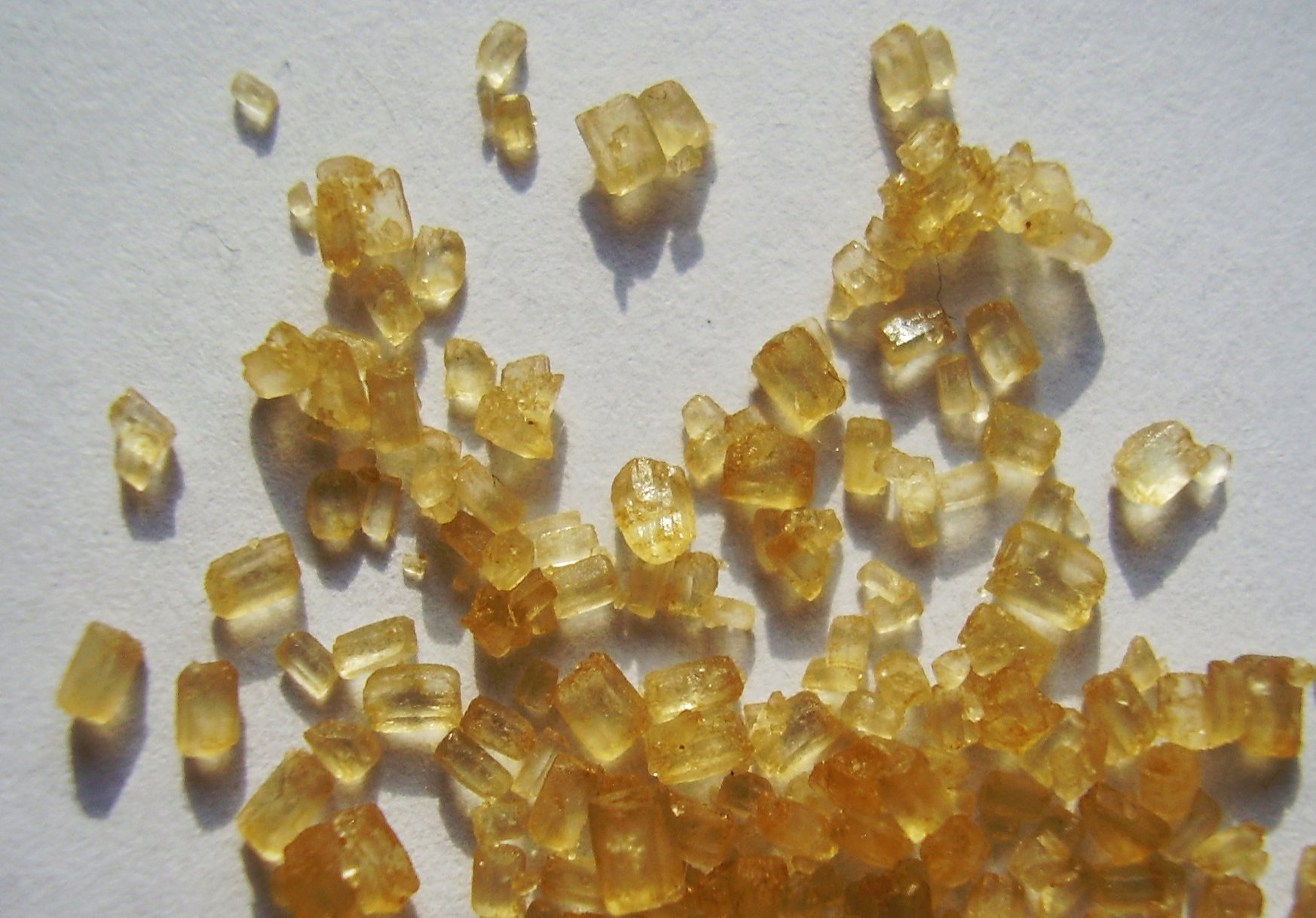
Brown sugar crystals

Brown sugar is a sucrose sugar product with a distinctive brown color due to the presence of molasses. It is either an unrefined or partially refined soft sugar consisting of sugar crystals with some residual molasses content, or produced by the addition of molasses to refined white sugar. Brown sugar is 98% carbohydrates (95% as sucrose), containing no dietary fiber or fat, and negligible protein and micronutrient content.

== Characteristics ==
The Codex Alimentarius requires brown sugar to contain at least 88% sucrose plus invert sugar. Commercial brown sugar contains from 3.5% molasses (light brown sugar) to 6.5% molasses (dark brown sugar) based on its total volume. Based on total weight, regular commercial brown sugar contains up to 10% molasses. Brown sugars are graded numerically according to how dark they are, with higher numbers correlating with darker sugars. The most common gradings are 6, 8, 10 and 13. The product is naturally moist from the hygroscopic nature of the molasses and is often labeled "soft." The product may undergo processing to make it flow better for industrial handling.

Particle size is variable but generally smaller than that of granulated white sugar. Products for industrial use (e.g., the industrial production of cakes) may be based on caster sugar, which has crystals of approximately 0.35 mm.

== History ==
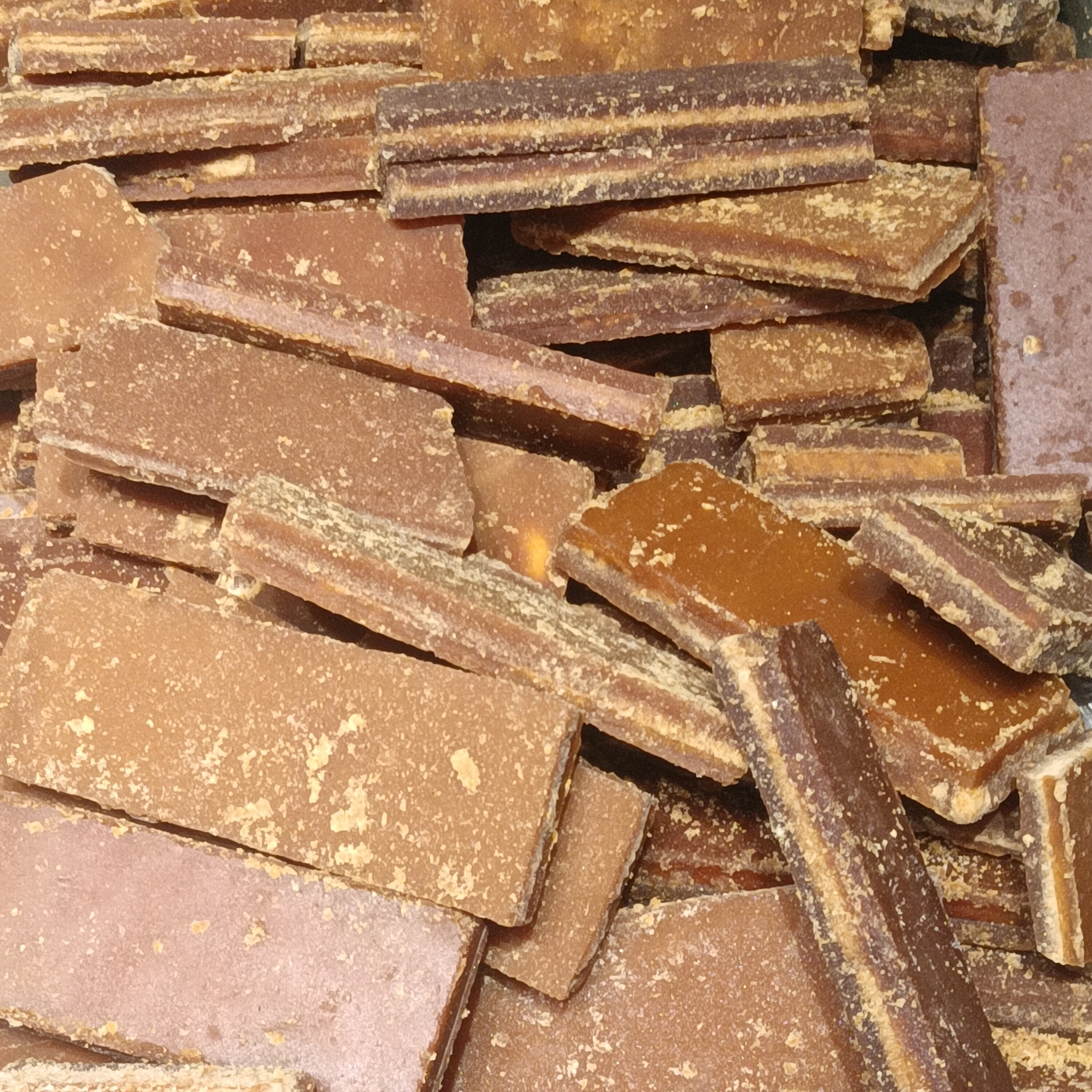
Brown sugar bricks

=== Consumer product ===
The meaning of the term 'brown sugar' has changed over time. Americans also referred to the 'brown sugar of commerce', which could be refined with a yield of 70% of white sugar. In the United Kingdom it was the same. There were two kinds of raw sugar. The most common kind was muscovado, a.k.a. "brown sugar", and was processed by British sugar refineries. The other kind of raw sugar was brown sugar which had been clayed and was known as clayed sugar. It was used for domestic purposes, but this usage was diminishing. In the 19th century United States the same meaning of the words raw sugar, brown sugar and muscovado was also noted: "Raw sugar, commonly called muscovado or brown sugar, not advanced beyond its raw state by claying, boiling, clarifying or other process".

In the mid 20th century, 'brown sugar' could refer to two products. It could be a raw sugar which had been centrifuged to a purity of about 97% pure sugar, and that was offered as brown sugar in health food shops. However, in most cases it was white sugar to which molasses had been added. For the latter, a consumer magazine said, "contrary to opinion, this brown sugar is a product of the refinery." The most important consideration is that the term 'brown sugar' now came to refer to a product for consumers, instead of referring to a type of sugar that was processed by sugar refineries.

=== Smear campaign ===
In the late 19th century, the newly consolidated refined white sugar industry, which did not have full control over brown sugar production, mounted a smear campaign against brown sugar, reproducing microscopic photographs of harmless but repulsive-looking microbes living in brown sugar. The effort was so successful that by 1900, a best-selling cookbook warned that brown sugar was of inferior quality and was susceptible to infestation by "a minute insect". This campaign of disinformation was also felt in other sectors using raw or brown sugar such as brewing;

Raw sugars are all more or less liable to be contaminated with decomposing nitrogenous matters, fermentative germs, and other living organisms, both animal and vegetable....For this reason, raw sugars must always be considered dangerous brewing materials.

— E. R. Southby. A Systematic Handbook of Practical Brewing, 1885

== Production ==
Brown sugar is typically produced by adding sugarcane molasses to completely refined white sugar crystals, with color varying by the amount of molasses used. Brown sugar prepared in this manner is often much coarser than its unrefined equivalent and its molasses may be easily separated from the crystals by simply washing to reveal the underlying white sugar crystals; in contrast, with unrefined brown sugar, washing will reveal underlying crystals which are off-white due to the inclusion of molasses. The addition of molasses, beyond changing the flavor, changes the sugar's characteristics during cooking, increasing the tendency for browning and making the sugar more hygroscopic.

The molasses usually used for food is obtained from sugar cane because the flavor is generally preferred over beet sugar molasses, although in some areas, especially in Belgium and the Netherlands, sugar beet molasses is used. The white sugar used can be from either beet or cane, as the chemical composition, nutritional value, color, and taste of fully refined white sugar is for practical purposes the same, no matter from what plant it originates. Even with less-than-perfect refining, the small differences in color, odor, and taste of the white sugar will be masked by the molasses.

== Natural brown sugar ==
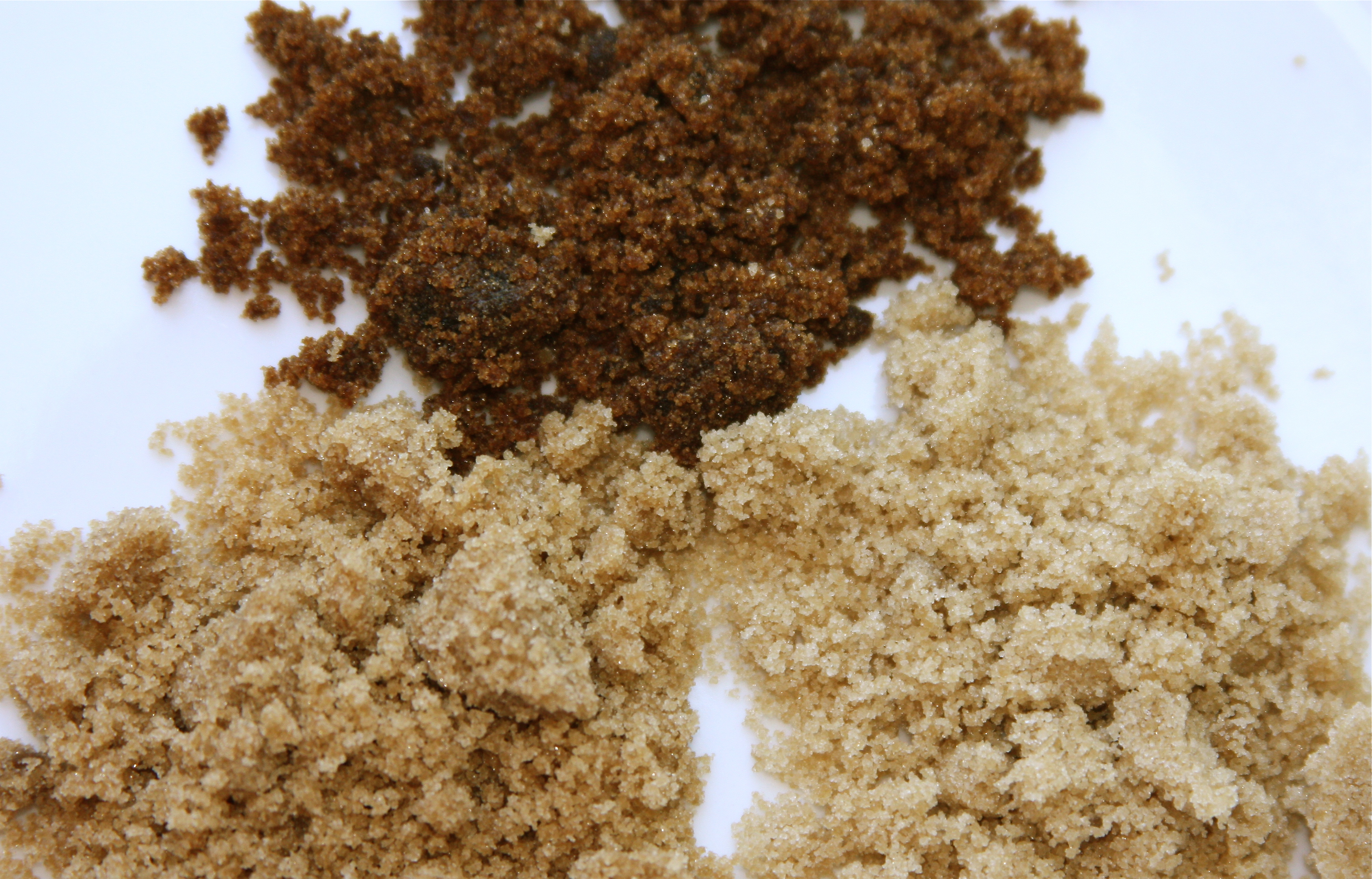
Brown sugar examples: muscovado (top), dark brown (left), light brown (right)

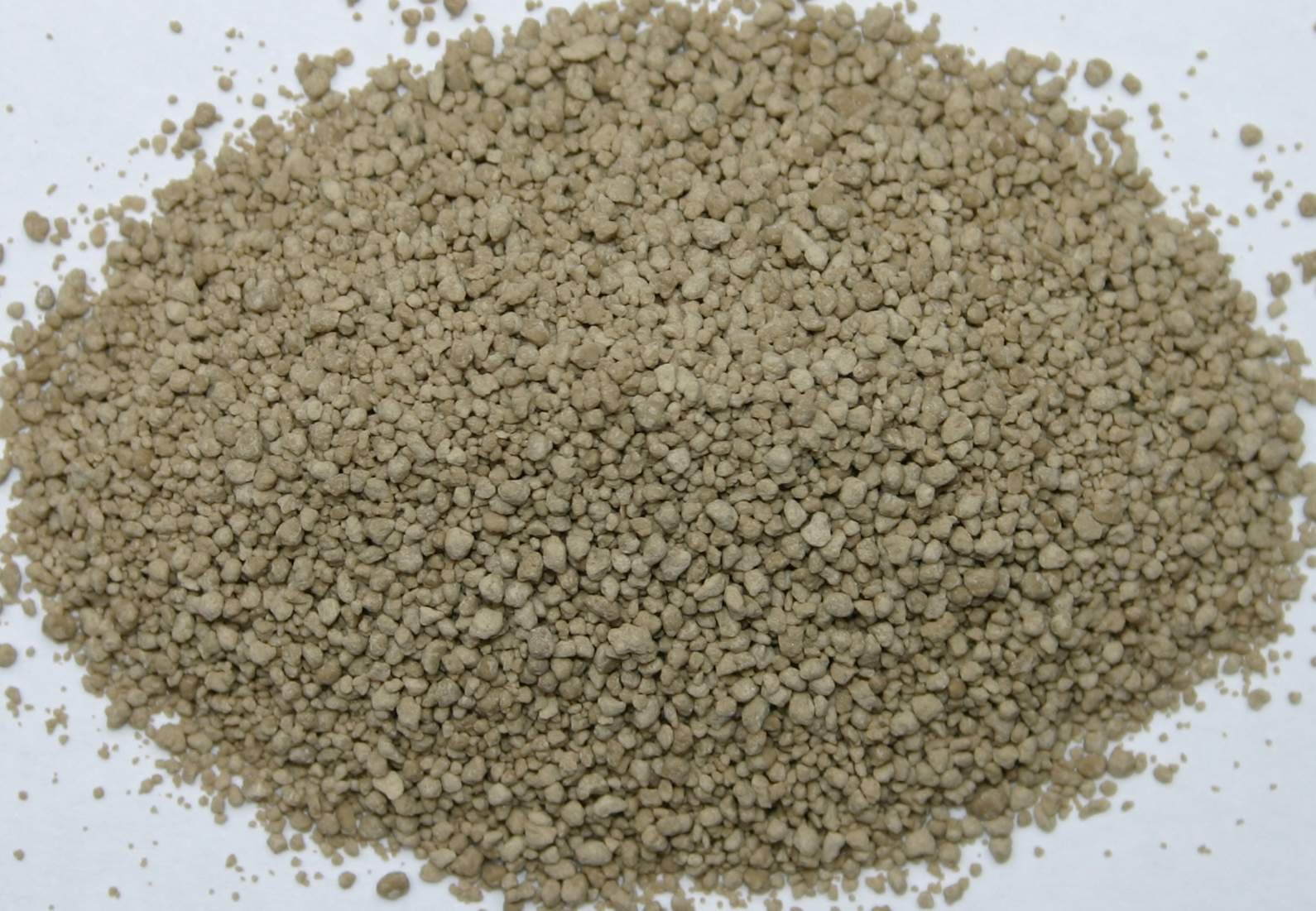
Whole cane sugar, unclarified

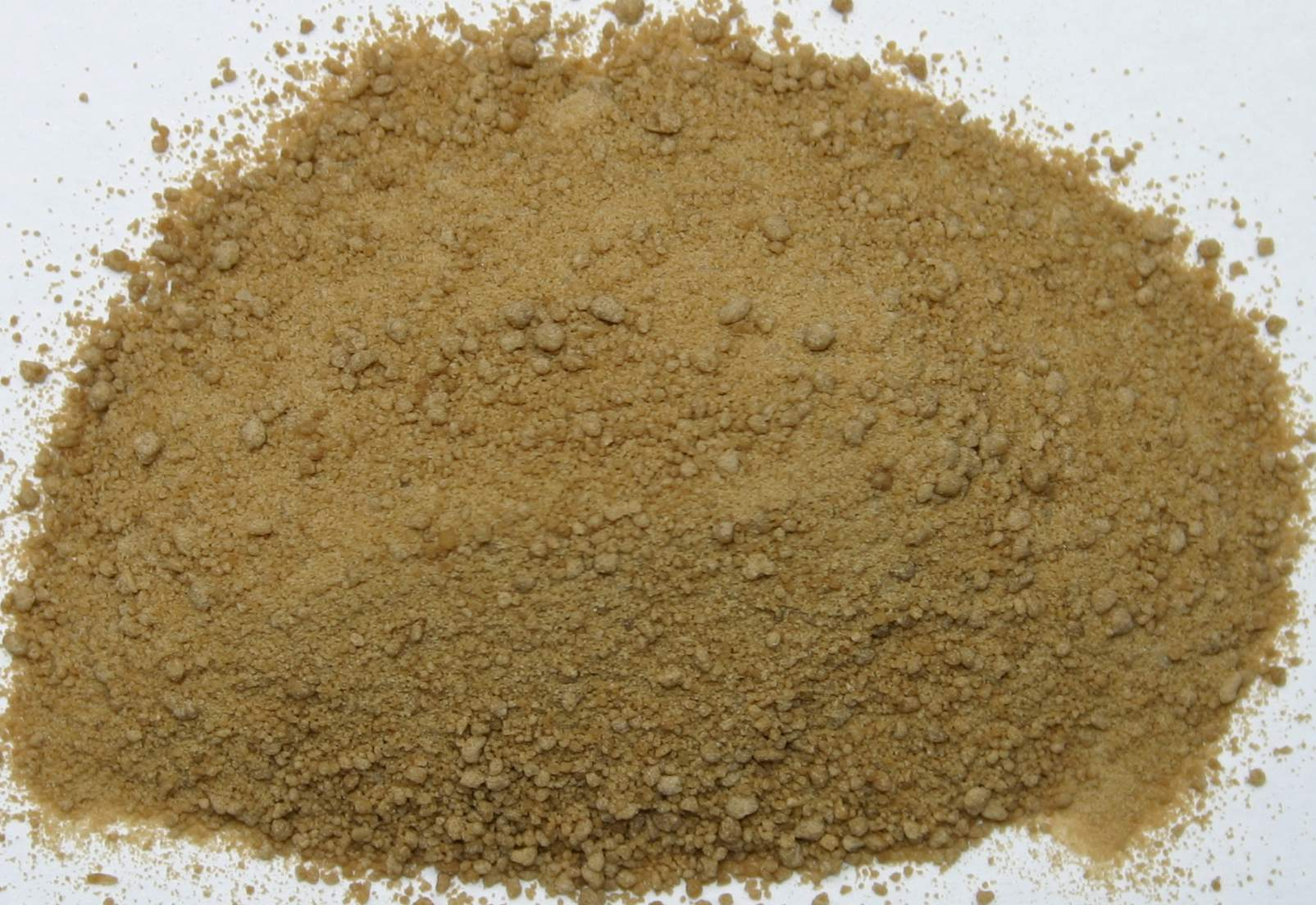
Whole cane sugar, clarified

=== Definition ===
Natural brown sugar, raw sugar or whole cane sugar is sugar that retains some amount of the molasses from the mother liquor (the partially evaporated sugarcane juice). The term 'natural brown sugar' can be traced back to at least the 1940s, when it was noted that the sugar refiners had pushed the brown sugar from the plantation owner out of the consumer market. Natural brown sugar was "the raw sugar, not the brown sugar most easily obtained, which usually is white sugar artificially colored." The term was devised to distinguish brown sugar that still contained part of its molasses from brown sugar made by adding molasses to white sugar.

=== Modern types of brown sugar ===
Brown sugar types include turbinado, muscovado, and demerara and despite some claims, their production does include a certain extent of refining and or processing (such as partial caramelization via slow cooking of raw cane juice amongst others).

Muscovado is the darkest of the modern types of natural brown sugar, sometimes almost black in color. Turbinado sugar is made from crystallized, partially evaporated sugar cane juice which has been spun in a centrifuge (giving its name) to remove part of the molasses. The sugar crystals are large and golden-colored. Demerara sugar is amber in color, 97–99% pure sucrose, and has also been centrifuged.

=== Traditional types of brown sugar ===
Traditional brown sugars are called by various names, such as panela, rapadura, jaggery, piloncillo, and others used regionally.

Muscovado from the Portuguese açúcar mascavado, was the most common type of raw sugar and was also called brown sugar.

Muscovado, panela, piloncillo, chancaca, jaggery and other dark brown sugars have been minimally centrifuged or not at all. These types are made in smaller factories or "cottage industries" in developing nations, where they are produced with traditional practices that do not make use of industrialized vacuum evaporators or centrifuges.

They are commonly boiled in open pans upon wood-fired stoves until the sugar cane juice reaches approximately 30% of the former volume and sucrose crystallization begins. They are then poured into molds to solidify or onto cooling pans where they are beaten or worked vigorously to produce a granulated brown sugar. In some countries, such as Mauritius or the Philippines, muscovado is produced by partially centrifuging the evaporated and crystallizing cane juice to create a sugar-crystal rich mush, which is allowed to drain under gravity to produce varying degrees of molasses content in the final product. This process approximates a slightly modernized practice introduced in the 19th century to generate a better quality of brown sugar.

==== Kokuto ====
A similar Japanese version of uncentrifuged natural cane sugar is called kokuto (Japanese: 黒糖, romanized: kokutō) or kurozato (Japanese: 黒砂糖, romanized: kurozatō, lit. 'black sugar'). This is a regional specialty of Okinawa and is often sold in the form of large lumps. It is sometimes used to make shochu. Okinawan brown sugar is sometimes referred to as "black sugar" for its darker color compared to other types of unrefined sugar, although when broken up into smaller pieces its color becomes lighter. Kokuto is commonly used as a flavoring for drinks and desserts, but can also be eaten raw as it has a taste similar to caramel. Kokuto is also an important local industry on Amami Ōshima, Kagoshima Prefecture; sugarcane cultivation and the production of brown sugar in Japan was first recorded on the island around 400 years ago, using techniques that had been developed in Fujian Province, China, and spread across the Japanese archipelago after that point. It is also the preferred type of brown sugar in Taiwan where its production formed a crucial part of the island's economy in the 19th and early 20th century under Japanese colonial rule. It is highly appreciated for its flavor in various beverages like milk tea and bubble tea.

== Culinary use ==
Brown sugar adds flavor to desserts and baked goods. It can be substituted for maple sugar in recipes. Brown sugar caramelizes much more readily than refined sugar, and this effect can be used to make glazes and gravies brown while cooking. Compared to other sugars, using brown sugar produces more moist and chewy baked goods due to its hygroscopic properties, with effects on chewiness increasing the darker the sugar. For this reason, brown sugar is used by some bakers for items where chewiness is desired, such as chocolate chip cookies. Due to its high molasses content, muscovado brown sugar contains more moisture and stronger flavor than other brown sugar types, affecting the moisture and taste of some recipes, especially in baked products.

For domestic purposes one can create the equivalent of brown sugar by mixing white sugar with molasses. Suitable proportions are about one tablespoon of molasses to each cup of sugar (one-sixteenth of the total volume). Molasses comprises about 3-7% of brown sugar's total weight. Due to varying qualities and colors of molasses products, for lighter or darker sugar, reduce or increase its proportion according to taste.

In following a modern recipe that specifies "brown sugar", one usually may assume that the intended meaning is light brown sugar, but how dark or light desired in the recipe is largely a matter of taste. Even in recipes such as cakes, where the overall moisture content might be critical, the amount of water contained in brown sugar is too small to matter. Much more significant than its water content is the fact that darker brown sugar or more molasses will impart a stronger flavor, with more of a suggestion of caramel.

Brown sugar that has hardened can be made soft again by adding a new source of moisture for the molasses, or by heating and remelting the molasses. Storing brown sugar in a freezer will prevent moisture from escaping and molasses from crystallizing, allowing for a much longer shelf life. Mildly hardened brown sugar can be broken up with utensils or placed into a closed container and shaken.

Sugar, brown
Nutritional value per 100 g (3.5 oz)
- Energy: 380 kcal (1,600 kJ)
- Carbohydrates: 98 g
- Sugars sucrose glucose: 97 g 95 g 1 g
- Dietary fiber: 0 g
- Fat: 0 g
- Protein: 0.1 g
Vitamins and minerals
Vitamins	Quantity %DV^{†}
Niacin (B3)	1% 0.11 mg
Pantothenic acid (B5)	3% 0.132 mg
Vitamin B6	2% 0.041 mg
Folate (B9)	0% 1 μg
Minerals	Quantity %DV^{†}
Calcium	6% 83 mg
Copper	5% 0.047 mg
Iron	4% 0.71 mg
Magnesium	2% 9 mg
Manganese	3% 0.064 mg
Phosphorus	0% 4 mg
Potassium	4% 133 mg
Sodium	1% 28 mg
Zinc	0% 0.03 mg
- Other constituents: Quantity
- Water: 1 g
- Full link to USDA database entry (the recommended maximum daily amount of added sugar based on a caloric intake of 2000 kcal is 50 g)
- ^{†}Percentages estimated using US recommendations for adults, except for potassium, which is estimated based on expert recommendation from the National Academies.

== Nutrition ==
Brown sugar is 98% carbohydrates (95% as sucrose), 1% water, and contains no dietary fiber or fat, with negligible protein and micronutrient content (table). In a reference amount of 100 g (3.5 oz), brown sugar supplies 380 calories (table).

== See also ==
- Caramelization
- Coconut sugar – a Javanese sugar
- Peen tong – a Chinese brown sugar and candy
- Sugar industry
