= Sago soup =

Chinese variant of tapioca pudding

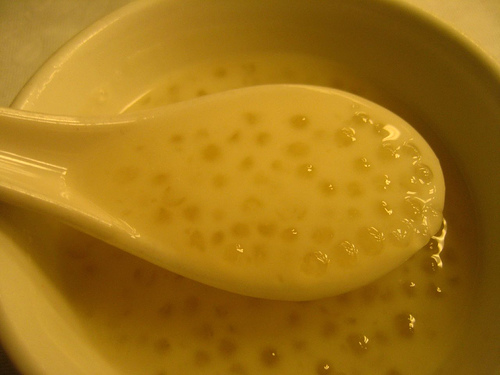
- Type: tong sui dessert
- Place of origin: Guangzhou

Sago soup
- Traditional Chinese: 西米露
- Simplified Chinese: 西米露
- Jyutping: sai1 mai5 lou6
- Literal meaning: sago soup
Transcriptions
Standard Mandarin
- Hanyu Pinyin: xī mǐ lù
Yue: Cantonese
- Jyutping: sai1 mai5 lou6

Sago soup or Sai mai lou is a type of tong sui dessert in Cantonese cuisine, which is also a variant of tapioca pudding. It is typically made with tapioca pearls (sago), coconut milk and evaporated milk. The dish is traditionally prepared using sago starch, which is derived from sago palm pith. Other ingredients can also be added, such as taro, pumpkin, mango, etc.

== See also ==
- Coconut soup
- List of Chinese soups
- List of soups
