= Hulatang =

Chinese traditional soup

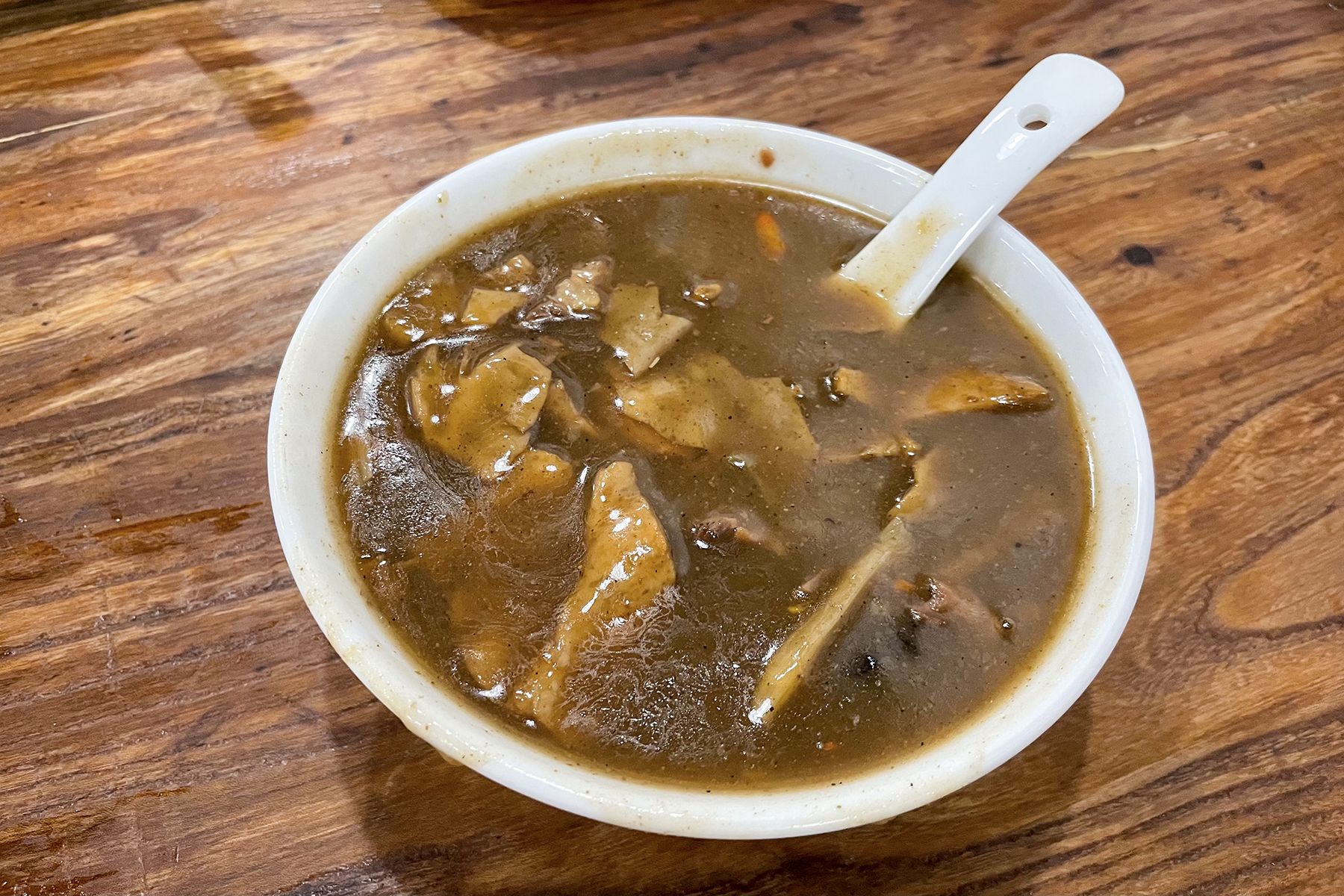
- A bowl of hulatang
- Alternative names: Spicy soup, hot pepper soup
- Type: Soup
- Place of origin: China
- Region or state: Henan, Shaanxi
- Main ingredients: Beef broth, capsicum, black pepper

Hulatang
- Simplified Chinese: 胡辣汤
- Traditional Chinese: 胡辣湯
- Literal meaning: peppery and spicy soup
Transcriptions
Standard Mandarin
- Hanyu Pinyin: hú là tāng

Hulatang is a traditional Chinese spicy soup that includes cooked beef, wheat starch, and heavy amounts of pepper. Originating in Henan Province, it became popular in both Henan and Shaanxi Province. Chinese immigrants have introduced it to the United States, where it is known as spicy soup or hot pepper soup. It can be divided into two different versions in Henan: Xiaoyaozhen version (from a town near Zhoukou City) and Beiwudu version. The name literally means pepper spicy soup.

== History ==
While the soups origins cannot be definitively identified, pepper, the main ingredient, was not introduced to China until the Tang Dynasty.

One theory is that soup with pepper originated from the Huizong period in the late Northern Song Dynasty. Legend has it that Emperor Huizong of the Song Dynasty was addicted to eating, drinking, and playing, which filled the whole country with extravagance.

At that time, there was a young eunuch in the palace, who was deeply loved by Emperor Huizong of Song. Once, a young eunuch was allowed by Emperor Huizong of the Song Dynasty to visit the temple and came to Shaolin Monastery in Songshan. The abbot in the temple was very enthusiastic about the celebrity in front of the emperor. When he saw the young eunuch's face red and ears red, lips thirsty, and food scarce, he presented a bowl of Shaolin Temple's unique "hangover soup". After drinking, the young eunuch felt refreshed and very happy, so he drank for several days. Before leaving, he asked the abbot for a prescription for "hangover soup".

Later on, the young eunuch came to Wudang Mountain to play. The leader of Wudang Mountain prepared the "Xiaoshi Tea" from Wudang Mountain for the young eunuch. After drinking it for a few days, the young eunuch's body returned to normal, and even his face became much rosy and fair. The young eunuch was very grateful for the "Xiaoshi Tea" and asked for it again.

After returning to the palace, the young eunuch handed these two prescriptions to the Imperial Buttery to develop a bowl of soup with a comprehensive color, aroma, and flavor. The taste was even more fragrant, and it could also sober up and refresh the mind, appetizer, and strengthen the spleen. This bowl of soup was presented to the emperor. When the emperor asked what the soup was called, the little eunuch had a brainstorm and replied, "prolong life soup".

After the "Jingkang incident", the little eunuch drifted to the folk and opened a breakfast shop. A guest accidentally sprinkled pepper into the pot. Unexpectedly, the taste was more rich and full-bodied. Later, it was named "Hulatang".

Along the decades, the soup has evolved into many variations in different parts of China, according to local people's flavor and preferences, but the most basic and characteristic thing about the soup has never changed, that it is heavily seasoned with pepper and the texture of the soup is thick and sticky. In addition to pepper, some herbs and flavourings such as ginger, aniseed and fennel are added into the boiling soup to improve the flavour and make it spicy and hot.

In modern China, especially for northerners, hulatang is a popular breakfast dish. A bowl of soup usually starts at four Yuan, but can be more expensive depending on the fame of the restaurant, quality and variety of its ingredients.

On 10 June 2021, the Xiaoyao Hu La Tang cooking technique was announced as the fifth batch of national intangible cultural heritage.

== Variation ==
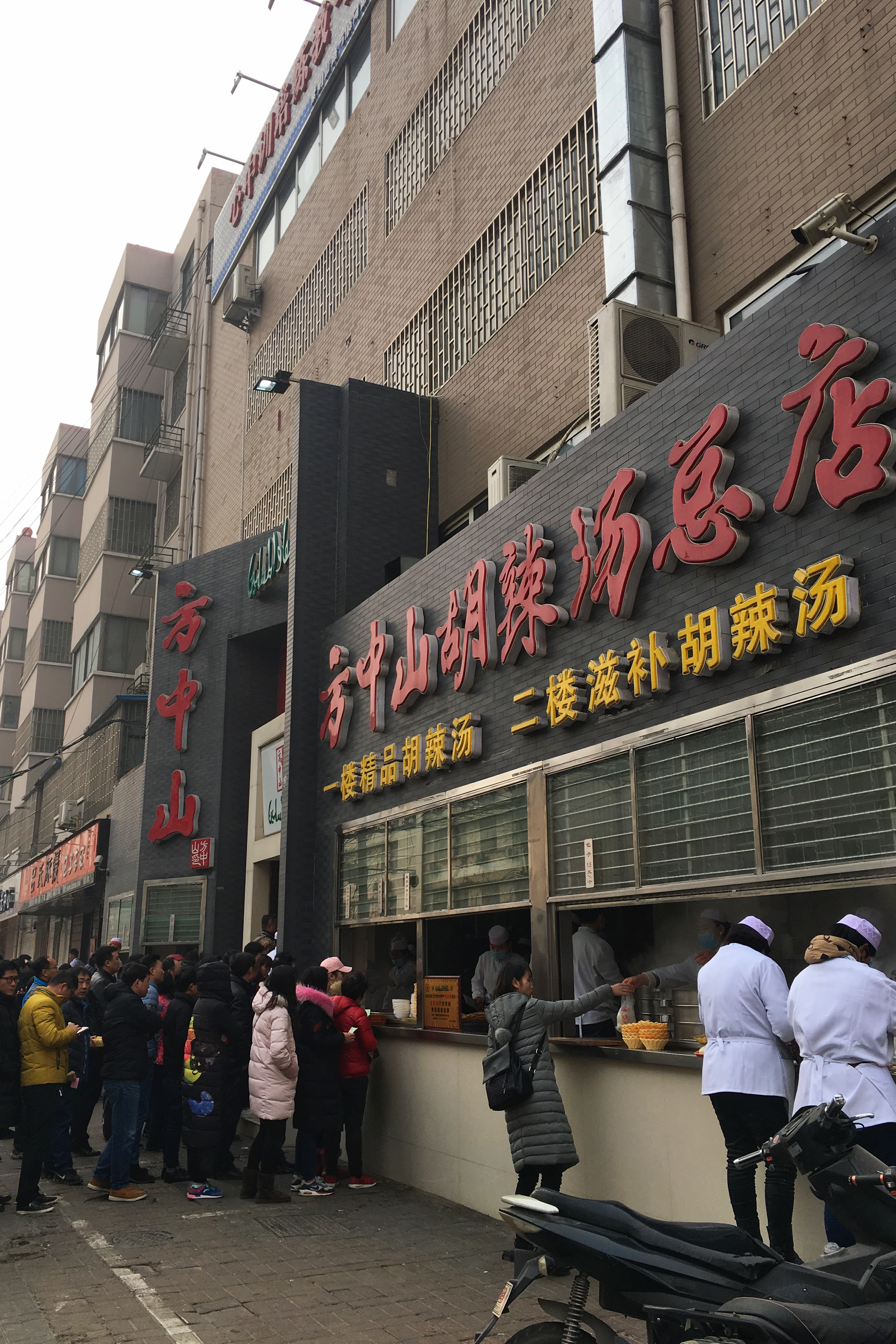
A restaurant specializing in hulatang in Zhengzhou

=== Beiwudu hulatang ===
The hulatang in Beiwudu is boiled with dozens of spices, so the color of the soup is dark. It tastes very hot because of the black peppers. Another name of Beiwudu hulatang is "eight treasures soup", which means there are many ingredients in it. Usually the ingredients include gluten, kelp, vermicelli, peanut, pepper and so on.

=== Xiaoyaozhen hulatang ===
The main difference between the soups is the usage of different spices. People cannot tell the proportional difference between Beiwudu and Xiaoyaozhen, but the Xiaoyaozhen hot pepper soup is more common as people in Xiaoyaozhen migrate to other places.

=== Xi'an hulatang with meatballs ===
Xi'an hulatang also has a long history, developing as people migrated between Shaanxi and Henan. People in Xi'an changed some ingredients in the soup, adding meatballs, potatoes, carrots, celery and many other vegetables to suit local tastes. Xi'an hulatang sometimes is served with chopped-up leavened flatbread.

=== Kaifeng hulatang ===
As a kind of sauce, hulatang is served with bean douhua. It has the heat and spicy taste of pepper and the sweet and refreshing taste of bean douhua.

=== Xingyang spicy soup ===
Xingyang spicy soup is made from a blend of various natural Chinese medicinal herbs in specific proportions, combined with pepper and chili, and simmered with a bone broth base. Its characteristics include a rich flavor, bright color, thick and sticky texture, and a spicy profile, making it a popular breakfast dish among the people of Xingyang. The main ingredients include spicy soup mix, pepper, chili, cooked mutton or beef, bone broth, wheat gluten, flour, vermicelli, and wood ear mushrooms. It is often eaten with deep-fried dough sticks, steamed buns, scallion pancakes, pan-fried flatbreads, and layered flatbreads. Especially when mixed with tofu pudding, known as "two mixed," it is highly favored by the locals. A poem describes: "Cooked at dawn, the spicy soup flows through the intestines all day, allowing for carefree enjoyment."

=== Huaiyang spicy soup ===
Huaiyang's Zhu Mazi braised meat spicy soup, historically known as "Zhu family spicy soup," was created by Zhu Mazi (real name Zhu Jinzhang), a resident of Huaiyang. Zhu's ancestors began selling spicy soup on the west side of the North Cross Street during the Song Dynasty. Legend has it that during the early days of Emperor Zhu Yuanzhang's reign in the Ming Dynasty, he passed through Huaiyang after several days without food. Exhausted and weak, he collapsed at the North Cross Street, where an old man surnamed Zhu rescued him and offered him a bowl of spicy soup. After drinking it, Zhu Yuanzhang immediately felt revived, drank three bowls in a row, and praised it as "excellent soup, excellent soup." After ascending to the throne, Zhu Yuanzhang summoned the old man to the imperial kitchen to be in charge of the soups. From then on, the Zhu family's spicy soup gained fame, and the Zhu family made it their livelihood.

During the Republic of China era, Zhu Mazi inherited the soup-making skills from his ancestors and, created the braised meat spicy soup, thus it became known as "Zhu Mazi Braised Meat Spicy Soup." This soup is characterized by its balanced consistency, moderate salty-sweet taste, tender meat, and a tangy, spicy flavor with an aromatic scent. It is said that "a morning drink of spicy soup leaves a fragrant burp till evening."

== Ingredients ==
The main ingredients include cooked beef, beef soup, flour, vermicelli, kelp, spinach, pepper, ginger, salt, vinegar and sesame oil.

== Economy ==
Local industry produces packets of ingredients and spices that are sold online. The government has promoted starting soup-selling businesses to those in poverty in the region.

== See also ==
- List of Chinese soups
- List of soups
