= Walnut soup =

Soup with walnuts as a main ingredient

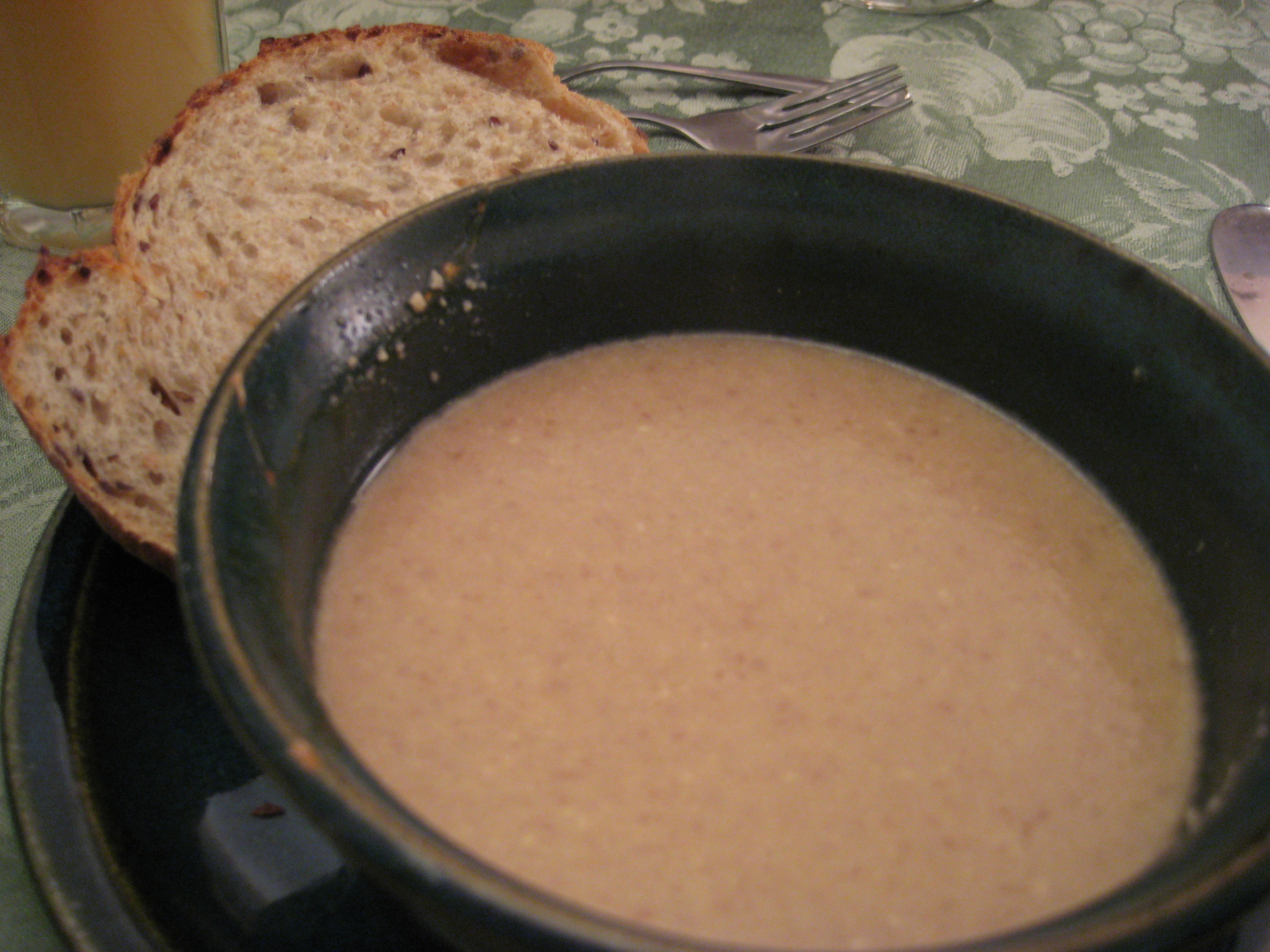
A walnut soup with bread

Walnut soup is a broth-based or cream-based soup prepared using walnuts as a main ingredient. It is sometimes prepared in combinations using other ingredients, such as pumpkin and walnut soup. Walnut soup is a part of the cuisines of China, Italy and Mexico.

== Overview ==
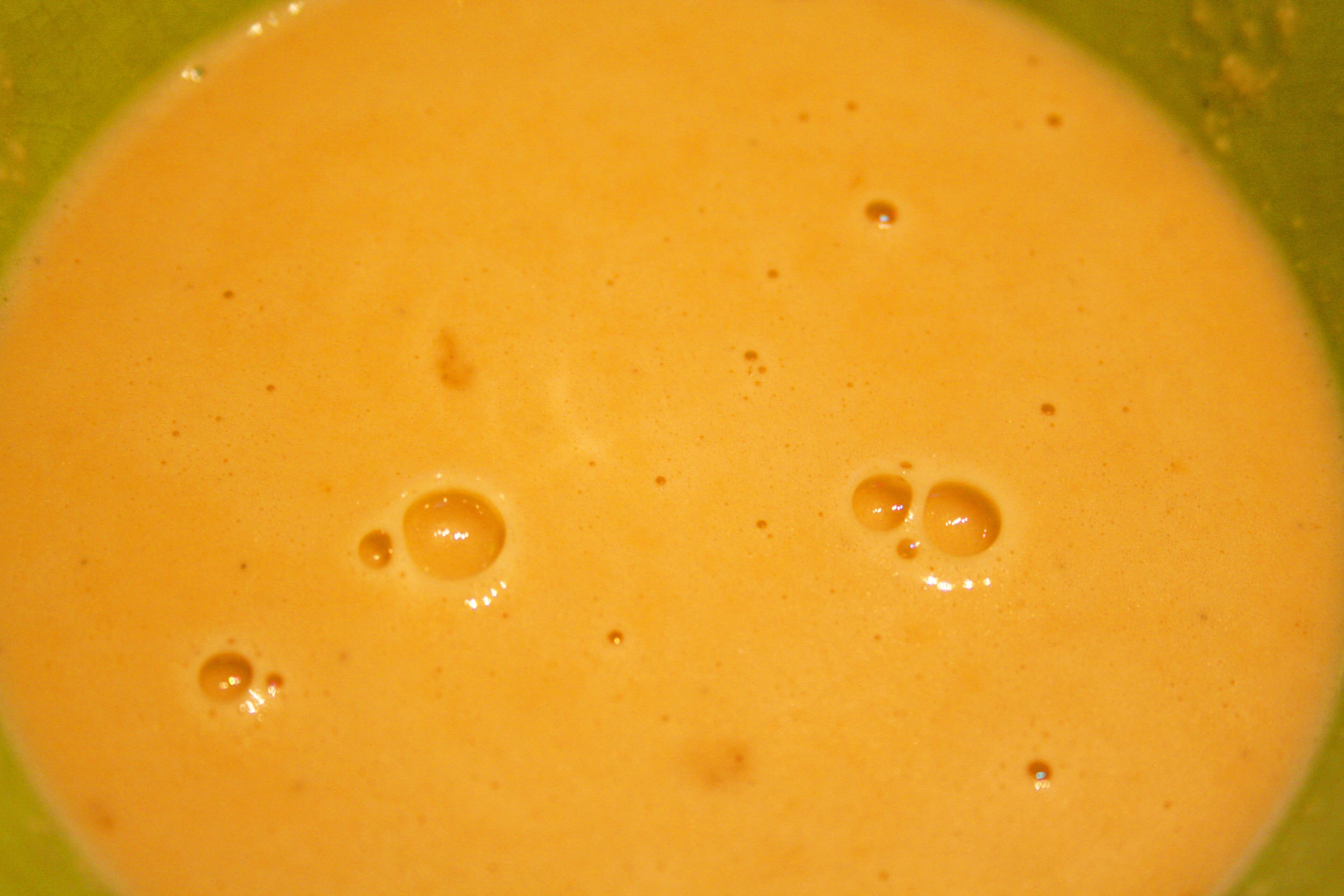
Close-up view of a cream of walnut soup

Walnut soup is prepared using walnuts as a primary ingredient. The soup can be prepared as a broth-based or cream-based soup, and the latter can be referred to as "cream of walnut soup". Fresh or canned shelled walnuts can be used, and the soup can include puréed, chopped and whole walnuts. Toasted walnuts can be used to prepare the soup. Walnut soup is sometimes prepared in combinations using other ingredients, such as "squash and walnut soup", "pumpkin and walnut soup" and "cucumber and walnut soup", among others. Additional ingredients can include butter, oil, walnut oil, lemon juice, seasonings, salt and pepper.

== By country ==
Hup tul woo (Chinese: 核桃糊; Jyutping: hap6 tou4 wu4) is a sweet walnut soup in Cantonese cuisine that is often eaten as a snack or dessert. Basic ingredients in hup tul woo include water, walnuts, rice flour and sugar. Additional ingredients used in its preparation can include cream, coconut milk, Chinese red dates, rice, peen tong (Chinese brown candy), ginger, salt and cognac. The walnuts for the soup are typically puréed or finely ground. It can be served as a hot or cold soup.

Minestra di noci (English: walnut soup) is a part of Italian cuisine, where it is prepared in the region of Piedmont, which has a significant number of walnut groves. In Piedmont, it is typically prepared in the winter.

Sopa de nueces (English: walnut soup) is a soup in Mexican cuisine. It can be served hot or cold, and sometimes has a delicate texture. (Note: "The walnut soup is served either hot or cold and is a delicate and unusual specialty.")

Walnut soups

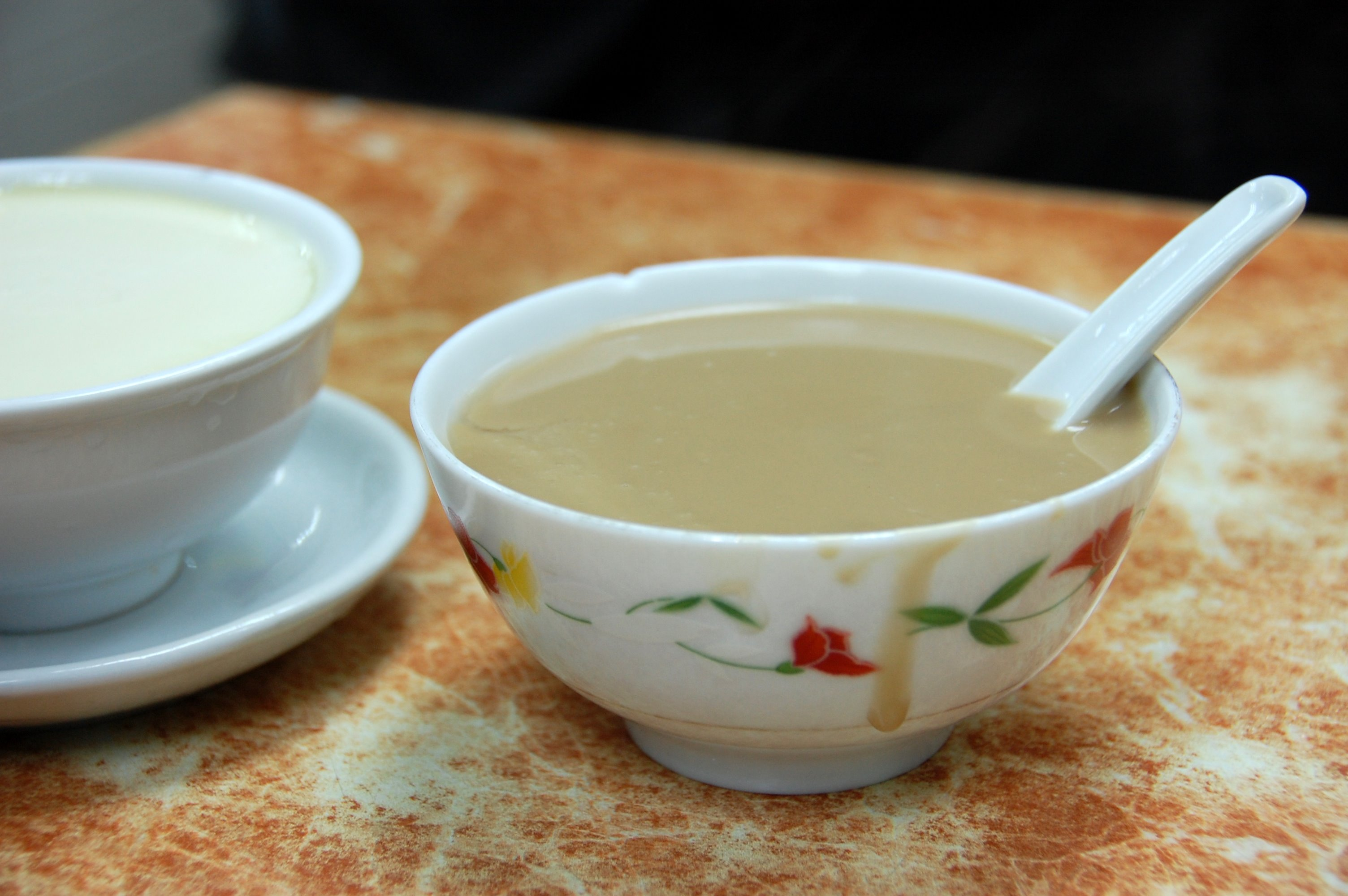
Hup tul woo, a Chinese walnut soup

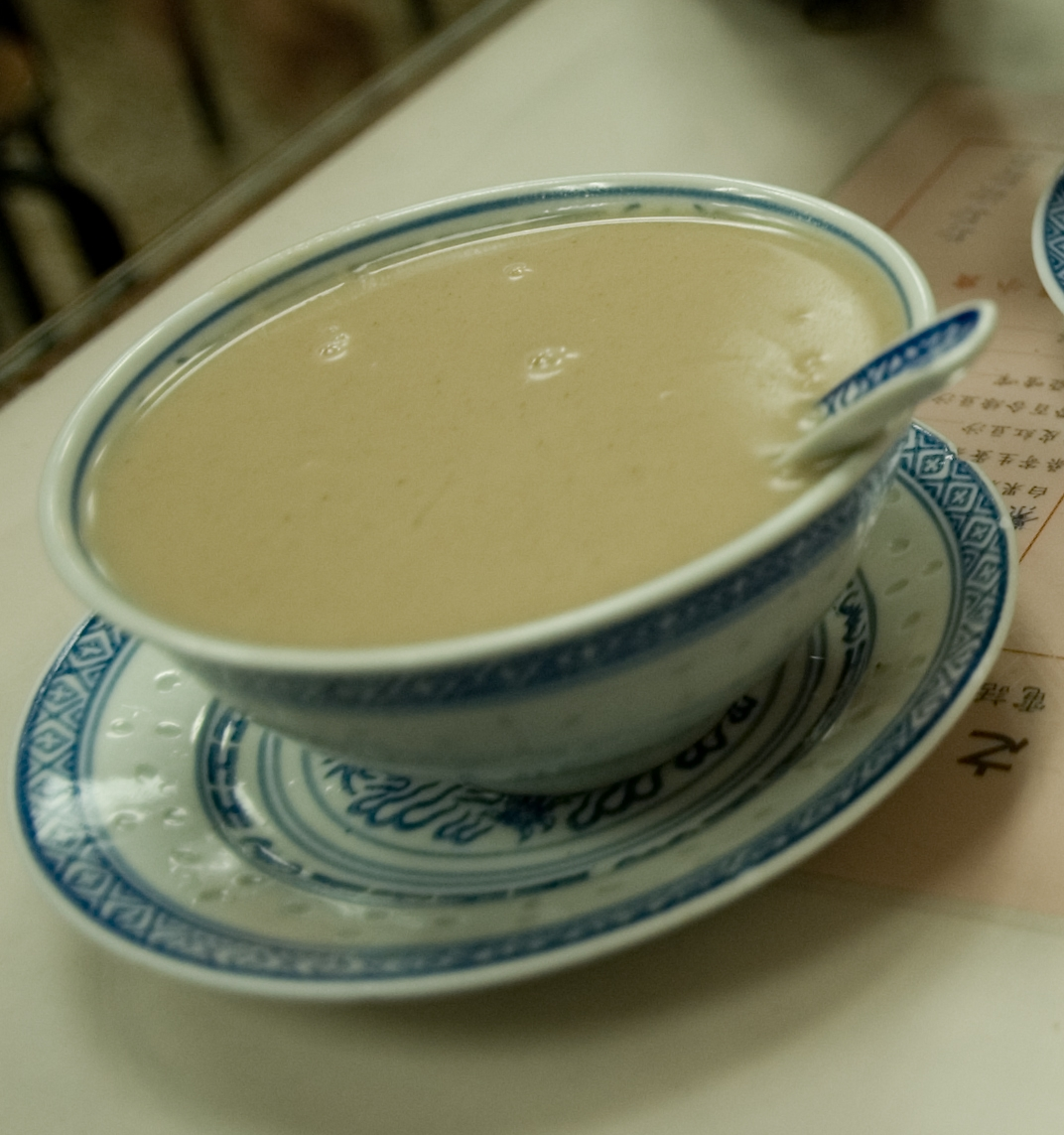
Close-up view of hup tul woo

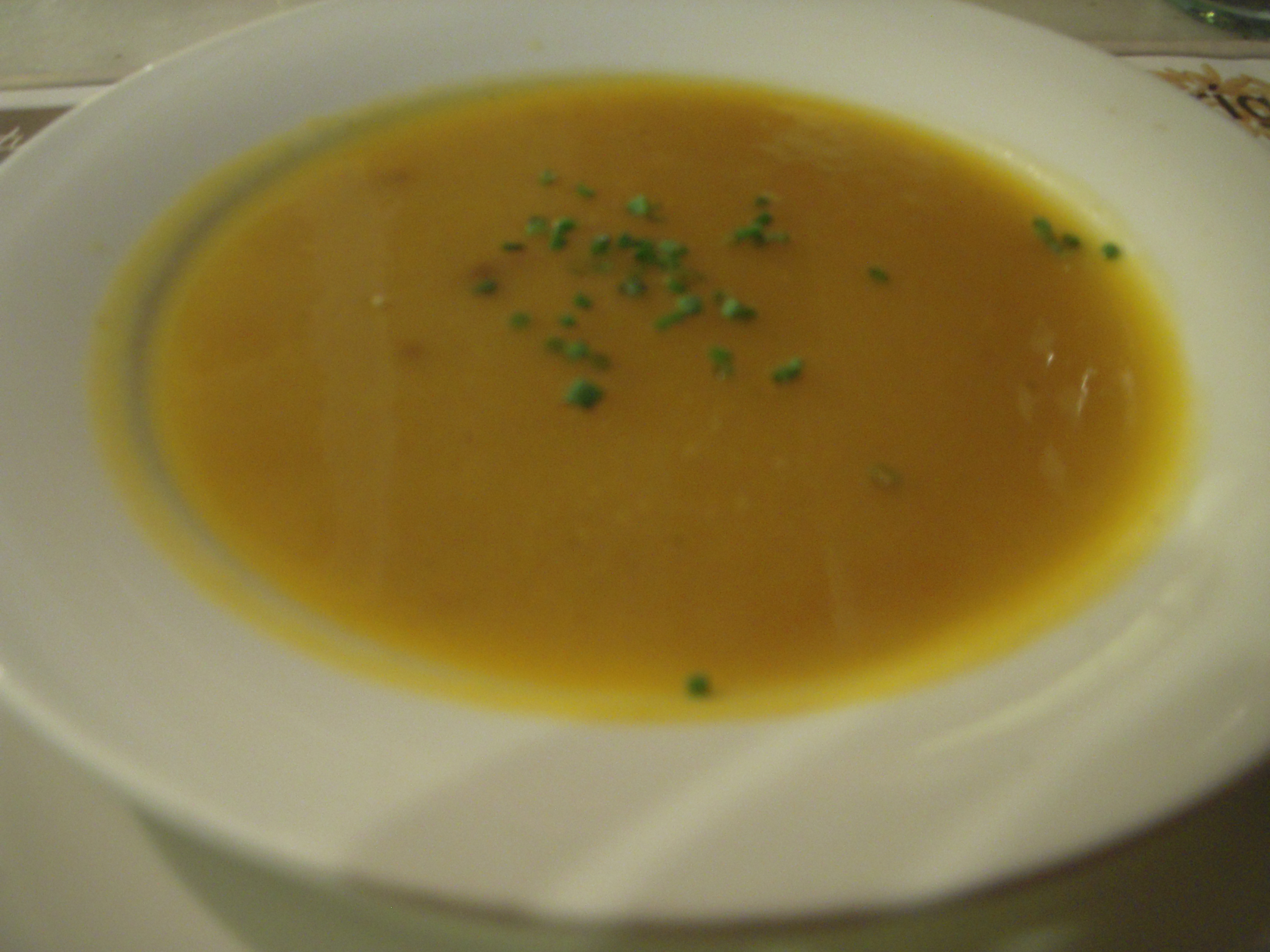
Squash and walnut soup

== See also ==
- List of soups
  - List of Chinese soups
  - List of Italian soups
- Pickled walnuts
- Walnut and coffee cake
- Walnut pie
