= Nangchang Jar soup =

Meat soup from Jiangxi, China

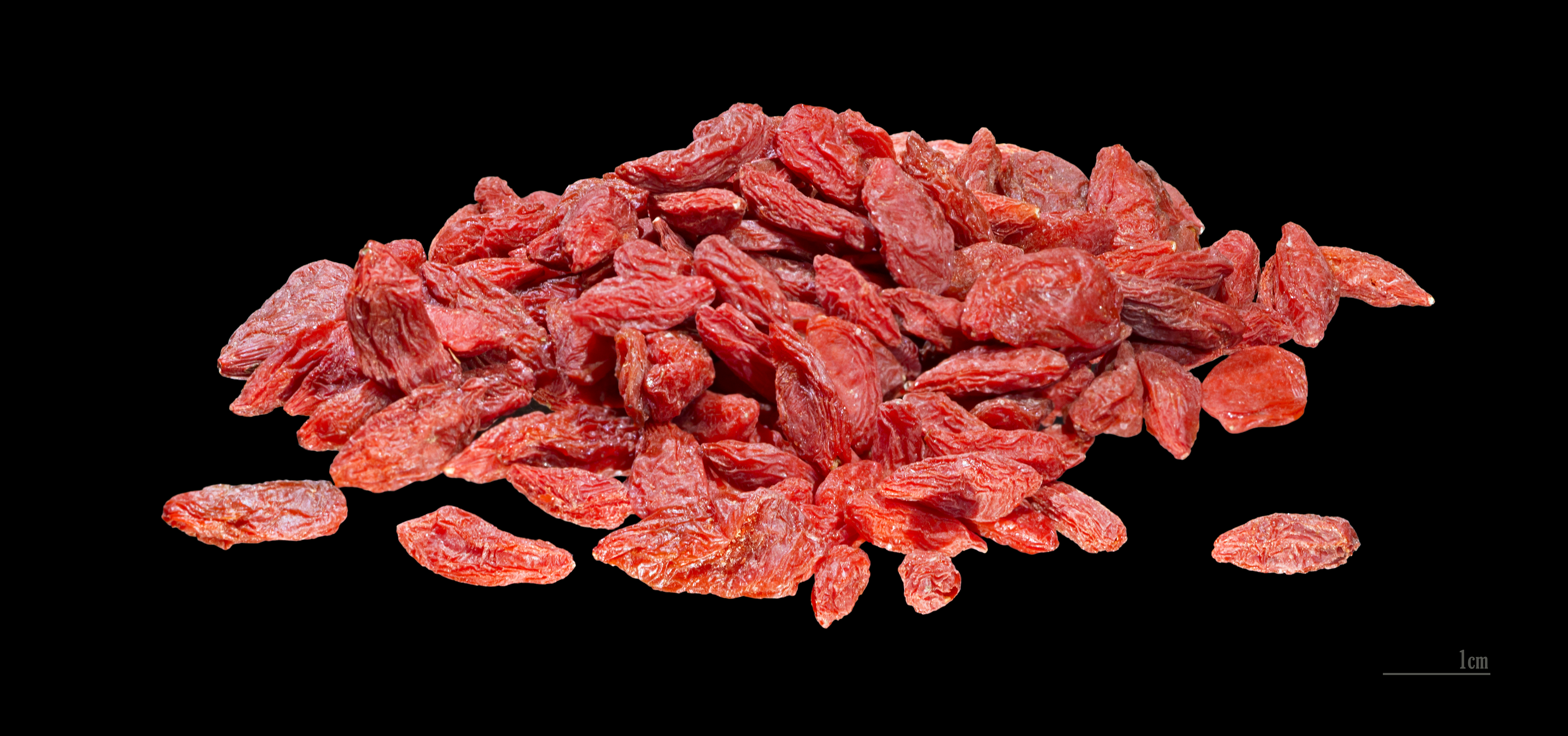
Chinese boxthorn, Dried fruit

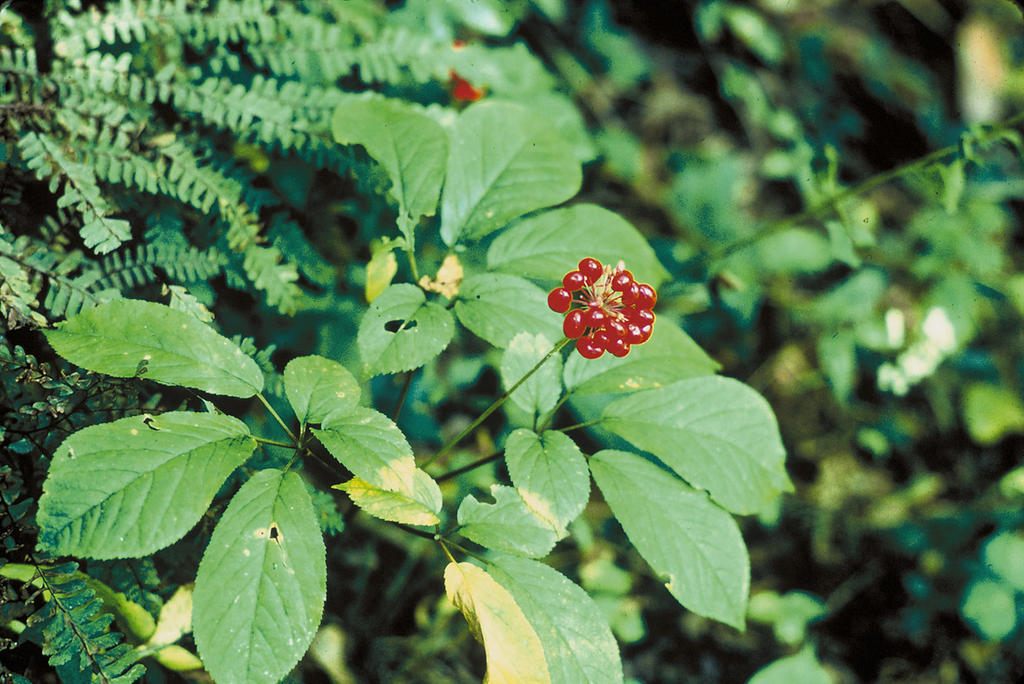
Chinese ginseng

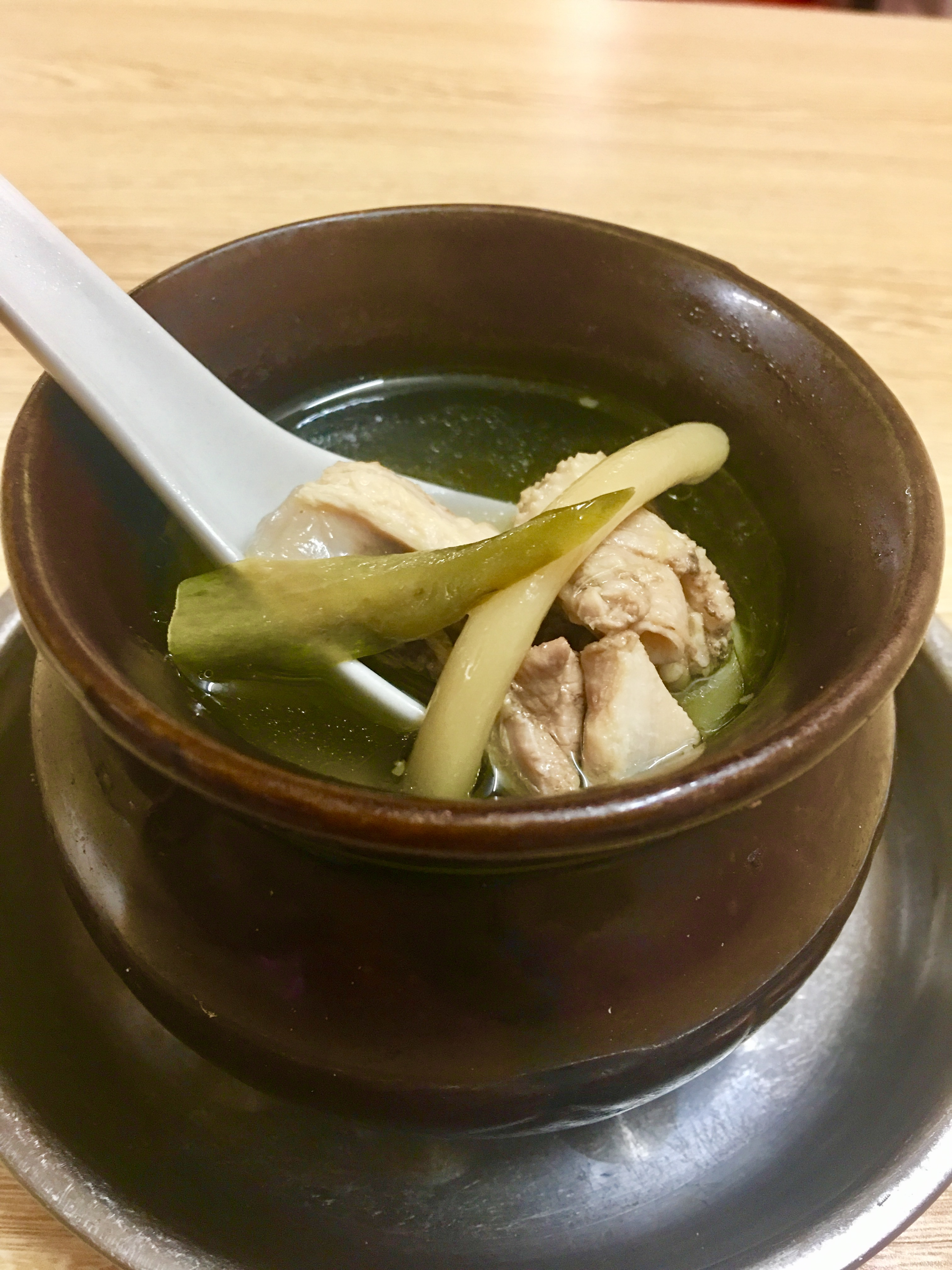
Nanchang jar soup with chicken and pitaya flower

Nangchang Jar soup is a Jiangxi cuisine of China, and it is meat soup which is carried by jar and stored in a big crock. Similar to Guangdong soup, the Jiangxi jar soup can be made from various ingredients from pork-bone, chicken and duck to different kinds of Chinese medicinal materials like ginseng, codonopsis and Chinese wolfberry.

Nonetheless, the Jiangxi jar soup has its own uniqueness which makes it differ from other kinds of Chinese soup.

== Uniqueness ==
Without pot cover, each soup jar is covered by silver foil with a tiny hole for letting out steam within when the soup jar is heated.

Being stored in a little soup jar which is put in a big crock, ingredients are heated by the air heat around the little soup jar, inside the big crock, instead of getting heat directly from fire of by transferring heat from the big crock.

== History and folktale ==
As a famous Jiangxi cuisine, Nangchang Jar soup has a history of over a thousand years. There even are some folktales about the origin of this soup. According to one, there was an honest and thrifty official named Tangbin in the Ming Dynasty. Tangbin worked hard and always did people favors. In order to help more poor people, Tangbin put all his food ingredients in a big jar to make soup for poor people. Since the food ingredients were stored in a big jar with high temperature for a day, the flavor of the soup become nicer. People appreciated that and made the same soup. As time went by, the following generations followed their ancestors and the soup invented by Tangbin became a famous soup in today's China.

== Health benefits ==
Since Jiangxi jar soup combines various ingredients together, its nutritive value is high which also matches Chinese people dietary habit. Chinese people prefer soup at their dining-table, they believe that having soup can help them derive nutrients to build a strong body. Moreover, Chinese people believe that having soup can somehow reduce the intake of other staple food, which is good for getting fat.

== See also ==
- List of Chinese soups
