= Tian mo =

Chinese breakfast soup

Tian mo (甜沫) is a traditional breakfast soup from the city of Jinan in the Shandong province of China. The soup is made of millet powder, peanuts, vermicelli, cowpea, spiced tofu (or shredded tofu skin), and spinach. The soup has a thick texture once cooked and has a salty taste. It is normally eaten with youtiao.

== See also ==
- Douzhi
- List of Chinese soups
- List of soups
