= Zhuzangfen =

Chinese noodle soup

A bowl of zhuzangfen

Zhuzangfen (Chinese: 猪脏粉; pinyin: Wēnzhōu zhūzàngfěn; lit. 'pig offal rice noodles') is a noodle soup dish made with rice noodles and offal such as pig intestines and duck blood. The dish is originated from Wenzhou, Zhejiang, China. It can be eaten for breakfast or throughout the day.

Intestines are cooked in condiments such as rice wine, soy sauce, ginger, soybean paste, or garlic until softened. Blood is added in a congealed form (such as pig blood curd) along with noodles, and the dish is finished with scallions.

In an effort to give consistent English names to 50 popular Wenzhou dishes, Zhejiang Vocational and Technical College of Industry and Trade called it "Rice Rolls with Boiled Pig's Intestines" in 2008.

As people from Wenzhou moved out of the city, they also introduced this dish to other regions. However, as the region develops and people in Wenzhou become more affluent, fewer people have been making authentic Wenzhou-style zhuzangfen.

== See also ==
- Zhejiang cuisine
- Bún bò Huế – a Vietnamese rice noodle dish featuring pork blood
- Oyster vermicelli – a Taiwanese wheat-flour noodle soup that sometimes uses intestine
- List of Chinese soups
