= Cantonese seafood soup =

Cantonese cuisine dish

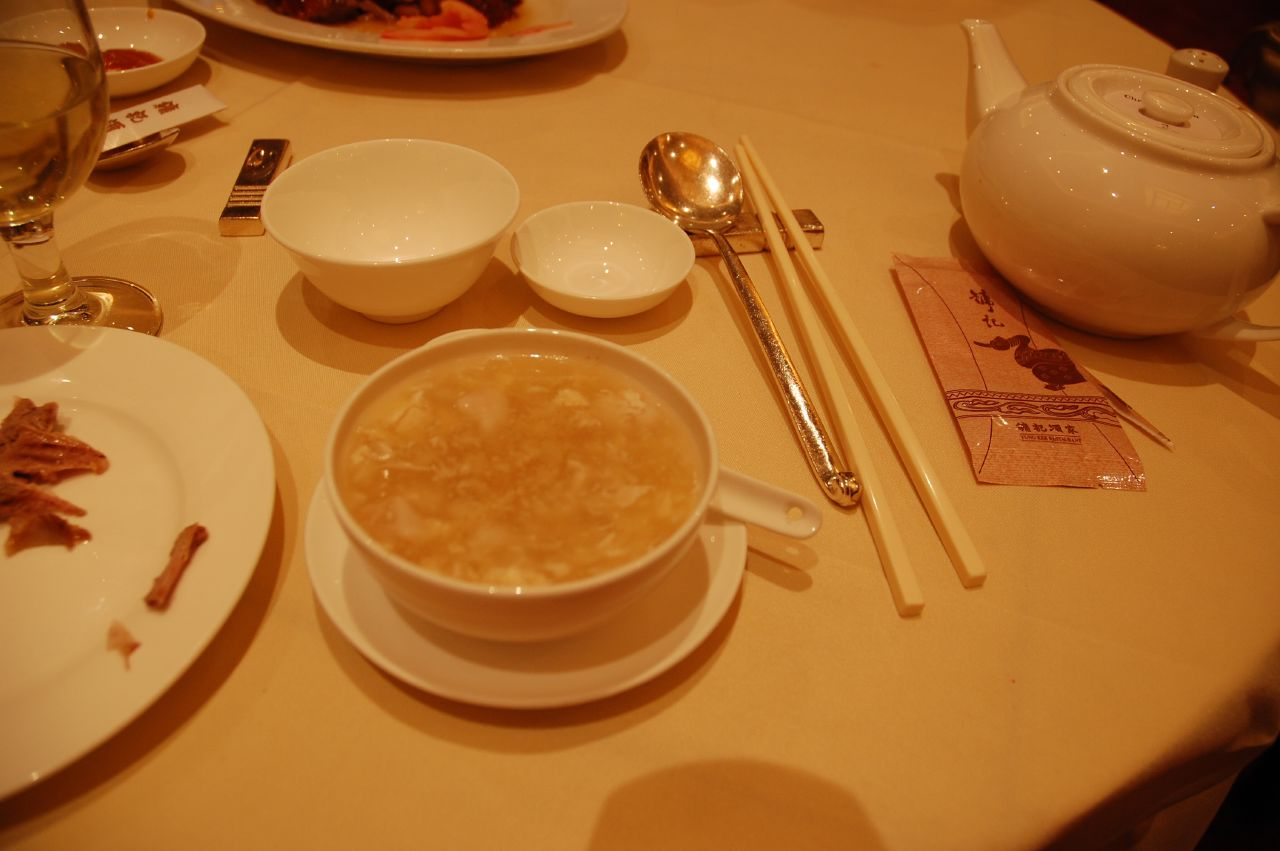
- Type: Soup
- Place of origin: China
- Region or state: Guangdong
- Main ingredients: seafood

Cantonese seafood soup
- Chinese: 海皇羹
- Literal meaning: sea emperor thick soup
Transcriptions
Standard Mandarin
- Hanyu Pinyin: hǎi huáng gēng
Yue: Cantonese
- Jyutping: hoi2 wong4 gang1
Southern Min
- Hokkien POJ: hái-hông-kinn

Cantonese seafood soup is one of the main seafood soups within Cantonese cuisine. It is commonly found in Hong Kong, and is also available in Chinatowns in other nations. The soup is usually considered midrange to high-end in price, depending on the ingredients.

== Description ==
The soup is generally thick with a very smooth texture, due to the use of starch as a thickening agent. It is usually whitish and a little transparent. The name of the dish describes it as a "gung" (羹) rather than the standard Chinese term for soup (tang, 汤); this reflects its southern Chinese origin.

== Variety ==
- Plain Cantonese seafood soup (海皇羹)
- Hundred flower Cantonese seafood soup (百花 . 海皇羹)
- Bamboo fungus Cantonese seafood soup (竹笙. 海皇羹)
- Crab meat Cantonese seafood soup (蟹肉 . 海皇羹)

== See also ==
- Miso soup
- Egg drop soup
- List of Chinese soups
- List of soups
