= Ou cuisine =

Chinese cuisine

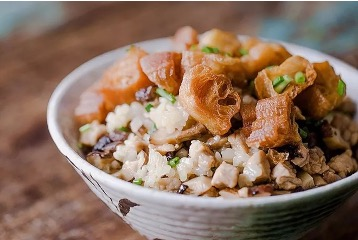
- Wenzhou glutinous rice, a notable dish in Ou cuisine
- Chinese: 瓯菜
- Traditional Chinese: 甌菜
Transcriptions
Standard Mandarin
- Hanyu Pinyin: Ōu cài

Ou cuisine, alternatively known as Wenzhou cuisine, is one of the four schools of Zhejiang cuisine, whereas Zhejiang cuisine is one of the eight major cuisines in China. The ancient name of Wenzhou is Dong'ou. After the founding of the People’s Republic of China, in order to improve the popularity of Wenzhou cuisine, catering experts has renamed the cuisine with its ancient name, "Ou cai". The major elements in Ou cuisine are seafood, which tastes fresh, light, and not bland. During the cooking process, it emphasizes "two light and a heavy," that is, light oil, light thickening, and heavy knife action, and it has a noticeable distinctive style.

== Origin ==
According to a historical Records Huozhi Biography, "In the land of Chu and Yue, rice and fish, fruits, vegetables, and clams..." It demonstrates that people at the period not only cooked fish soup using raw fish but also ate "fruit and veggies with clams." "People in the southeast consume aquatic fish, mussels, snails, and clams as delicacy, but don't recognize it's fishy," according to Zhang Hua's "Natural History." "The Beauty of Food" and "Qiou Wen Mirage" are references to the people of Ouyue at the period, who lived off snakes and clams and believed them to be high-quality treasures. The dietary practices were further developed and enhanced, and cuisine was gradually evolved, which is now known as Ou cuisine. (simplified Chinese: 史记·货殖传》载)

== Notable dishes ==
In order to promote the construction of "Poetic Painting Zhejiang & Hundred counties and thousand bowls" (simplified Chinese: 诗画浙江·百县千碗), recently, hosted by Wenzhou Culture, Radio, Film and Tourism Bureau, Wenzhou Restaurant and Catering Industry Association, the 2021 "hundred counties and thousand bowls - Ou cuisine top ten series of dishes" selection results are available. There were a total of evaluation of 2021 "Ou cuisine top ten hot dishes", "Ou cuisine top ten cold dishes", "Ou cuisine top ten snacks", "Ou cuisine top ten desserts" and "Ou cuisine top ten fashion dishes".

Ou Cuisine Top Ten Hot Dishes 2021
Dish Images	English	Simplified Chinese	Traditional Chinese	Pinyin	Notes
	Three Wire Knock Fish	三丝敲鱼	三絲敲魚	Sān sī qiāo yú	For this dish, use offshore fish or fresh yellow croaker, remove the head, tail, and skin of the fish, cut into needle slices, dip them in dry starch, and slowly knock them into thin slices with a mallet, and cook them in boiling water.
	Scallion Oil Yellow Fish	葱油黄鱼	蔥油黃魚	Cōng yóu huángyú	Pour heated oil over steamed yellow fish
	Hibiscus mud crab	芙蓉蝤蠓	芙蓉蝤蠓	fúróng qiú měng	
	Roasted Duck with Dendrobium	石斛烧老鸭	石斛燒老鴨	shíhú shāo lǎo yā	
	Net tide jumping fish	网潮跳鱼	網潮跳魚	wǎng cháo tiào yú	
	Yongjia Tianyu	永嘉田鱼	永嘉田魚	yǒngjiā tián yú	
	Berwyn Pork Knuckle	伯温猪脚	伯溫豬腳	bó wēn zhū jiǎo	Select local pig's feet, add wine, salt, mushrooms, angelica and other raw materials, put them in a clay pot and simmer them over a charcoal fire
	Ginger wine jellyfish blood	姜酒海蜇血	姜酒海蜇血	jiāng jiǔ hǎizhē xuè	
	Fried Rice Cake with River Crab	江蟹炒年糕	江蟹炒年糕	jiāng xiè chǎo niángāo	
	Braised river eel	酒炖河鳗	酒燉河鰻	jiǔ dùn hé mán	

Ou Cuisine Top Ten Cold Dishes 2021
Dish Images	English	Simplified Chinese	Traditional Chinese	Pinyin	Notes
Wenzhou Fish Cake	Wenzhou fish cake	温州鱼饼	溫州魚餅	Wēnzhōu yú bǐng	
	Wenzhou duck tongue	温州鸭舌	溫州鴨舌	wēnzhōu yā shé	The duck tongue is marinated, airy to semi-dry, chewy in the mouth, very chewy
	Wenzhou River Crab	温州江蟹生	溫州江蟹生	wēnzhōu jiāng xiè shēng	
	Yongqiang Garlic Jelly	永强泥蒜冻	永強泥蒜凍	yǒngqiáng ní suàn dòng	
	Hijiki salad	凉拌羊栖菜	涼拌羊栖菜	liángbàn yáng qī cài	
	Eel	鳗鲞	鰻鯗	mán xiǎng	
	Ruian Zhayang	瑞安扎羊	瑞安扎羊	ruì'ān zhā yáng	sliced lamb
	Raw vegetable dish	盘菜生	盤菜生	pán cài shēng	
	Wenzhou Roast Goose	温州烧鹅	溫州燒鵝	wēnzhōu shāo é	
	Wenzhou Lomei	温州卤味	溫州滷味	wēnzhōu lǔwèi	

Ou Cuisine Top Ten Snacks 2021
Dish Images	English	Simplified Chinese	Traditional Chinese	Pinyin	Notes
Wenzhou Wonton	Wenzhou wonton	温州馄饨	溫州餛飩	Wēnzhōu húntún	
	Wenzhou Fish Balls	温州鱼丸	溫州魚丸	wēnzhōu yú wán	
	Pig Dirty Powder	猪脏粉	豬臟粉	zhū zàng fěn	
Wenzhou glutinous rice	Wenzhou glutinous rice	温州糯米饭	溫州糯米飯	wēnzhōu nuòmǐ fàn	It is made of steamed glutinous rice, sprinkled with minced fritters or chunks of fritters and minced meat soup. It is a special breakfast in Wenzhou and the first choice for all Wenzhou people.
	Ginger Wine Plain Noodles	姜酒素面	姜酒素面	jiāng jiǔ sùmiàn	
	Ginger cat ears	姜丝猫耳朵	薑絲貓耳朵	jiāng sī māo ěrduǒ	
	Qingjiang Three Fresh Noodles	清江三鲜面	清江三鮮面	qīngjiāng sān xiān miàn	
	Tengjiao five spice dried	腾蛟五香干	騰蛟五香乾	téng jiāo wǔxiāng qián	
	Wenzhou Fried Noodles	温州炒粉干	溫州炒粉乾	wēnzhōu chǎo fěn qián	
	Wenzhou jelly	温州胶冻	溫州膠凍	wēnzhōu jiāo dòng	Most of the raw materials are yellow fish maw or mink fish maw, boiled with water to form a thick liquid, and then naturally cooled to form a "jelly"

Ou Cuisine Top Ten Desserts 2021
Dish Images	English	Simplified Chinese	Traditional Chinese	Pinyin	Descriptions
	Layer cake	九层糕	九層糕	Jiǔ céng gāo	A cake has 9 separate layers
	Lard cake	猪油糕	豬油糕	zhū yóu gāo	The lard cake is made from glutinous rice and sugar, and then fried in lard
	Lamp cake	灯盏糕	燈盞糕	dēngzhǎn gāo	
	Jinfen Dumpling	锦粉饺	錦粉餃	jǐn fěn jiǎo	
	Sponge cake	松糕	鬆糕	sōng gāo	
	Ma Qiao	麻巧	麻巧	má qiǎo	
	Bridge Pier Mooncake	桥墩月饼	橋墩月餅	qiáodūn yuèbǐng	It is stuffed with more than 10 kinds of materials such as fatty meat, peanuts, winter melon candy, longan, peanuts, cashews and egg yolks, and then sprinkles a layer of sesame seeds on the surface and bakes.
	Yongjia Oatmeal	永嘉麦饼	永嘉麥餅	yǒngjiā mài bǐng	
	Ryan's Double Cooking Cake	瑞安双炊糕	瑞安雙炊糕	ruì'ān shuāng chuī gāo	Created by Li Ruiqing in the Guangxu period of the Qing Dynasty, it has a history of more than 100 years.
	Japonica rice dumplings	粳米糄儿	粳米糄兒	jīngmǐ biǎn er	
