= List of Chinese soups =

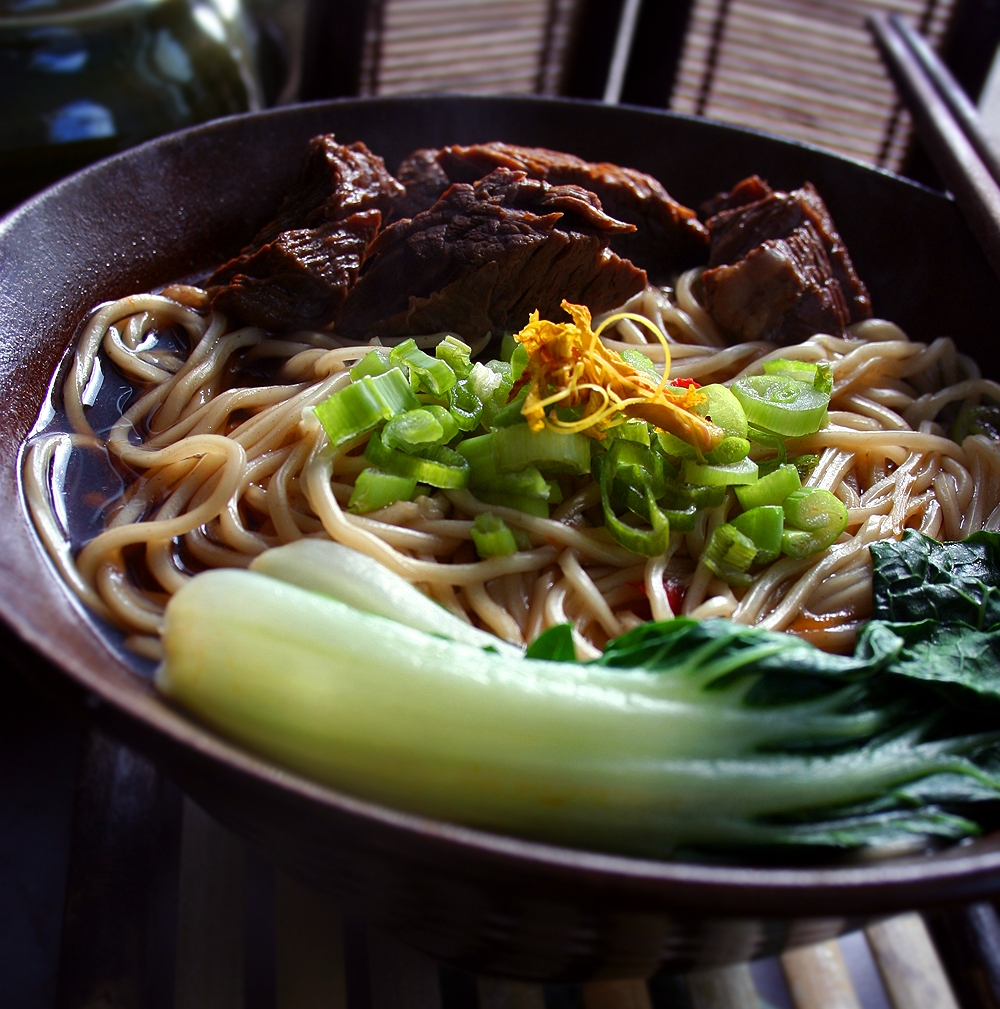
Beef noodle soup

This is a list of notable Chinese soups. Chinese cuisine includes styles originating from the diverse regions of China, as well as from Chinese people in other parts of the world. In China, a broth-based soup is usually consumed before or after a meal. Chinese noodles may be added to some of these soups to create noodle soups.

== Chinese soups ==
- ABC soup (carrot, potato, and tomato)

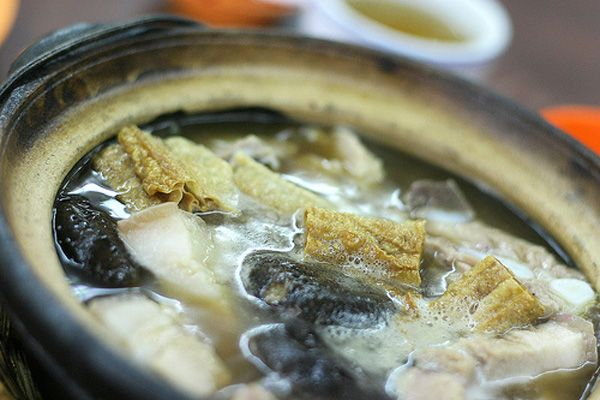
A close-up view of Bak kut teh

- Bak kut teh
- Banmian
- Beef noodle soup
- Bittergourd soup
- Boiled mutton soup
- Buddha Jumps Over the Wall
- Cantonese seafood soup
- Carp soup
- Chicken and duck blood soup
- Chicken soup – Many Chinese soups are based on chicken broth. Typical Chinese chicken soup is made from old hens and is seasoned with ginger, scallions, black pepper, soy sauce, rice wine and sesame oil.
- Chinese herbal soups – homemade remedies with herbs or adaptogens (a well-known example is ginseng) to help heal specific health concerns.
- Corn crab soup
- Crossing the bridge noodles
- Duck blood and vermicelli soup

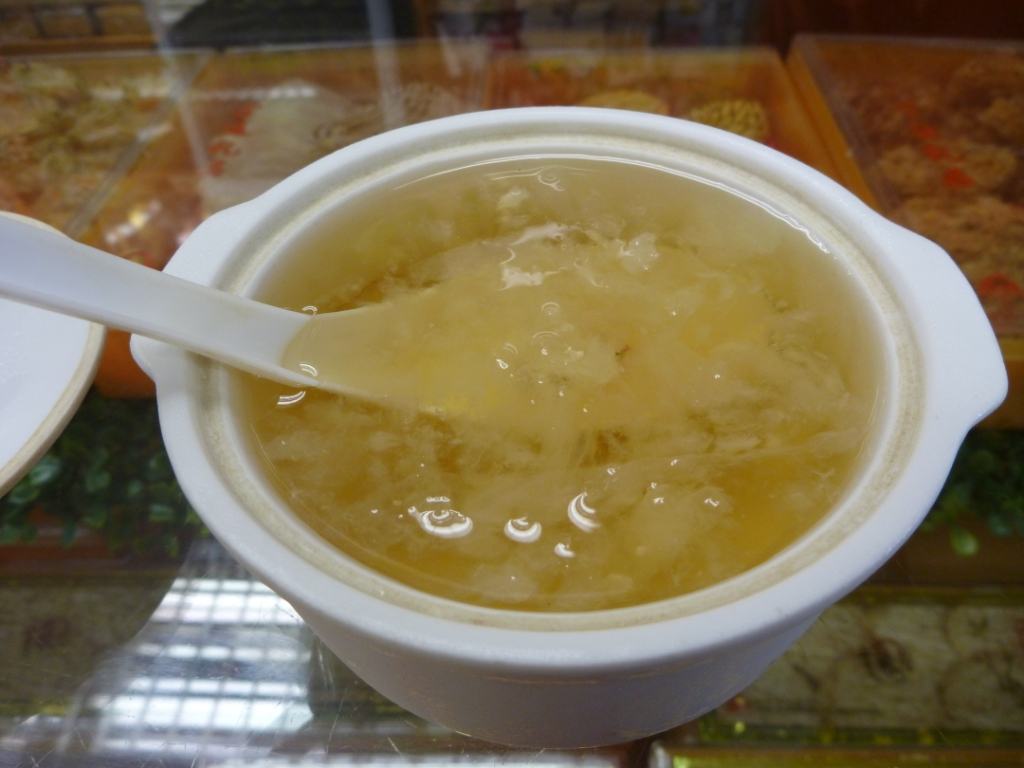
Bird's nest soup in Malaysia

- Egg drop soup
- Fish and mustard leaf soup
- Fish head soup
- Geng
- Ginger soup (usually with egg)
- Ginseng chicken soup
- Hot and sour soup
- Hulatang

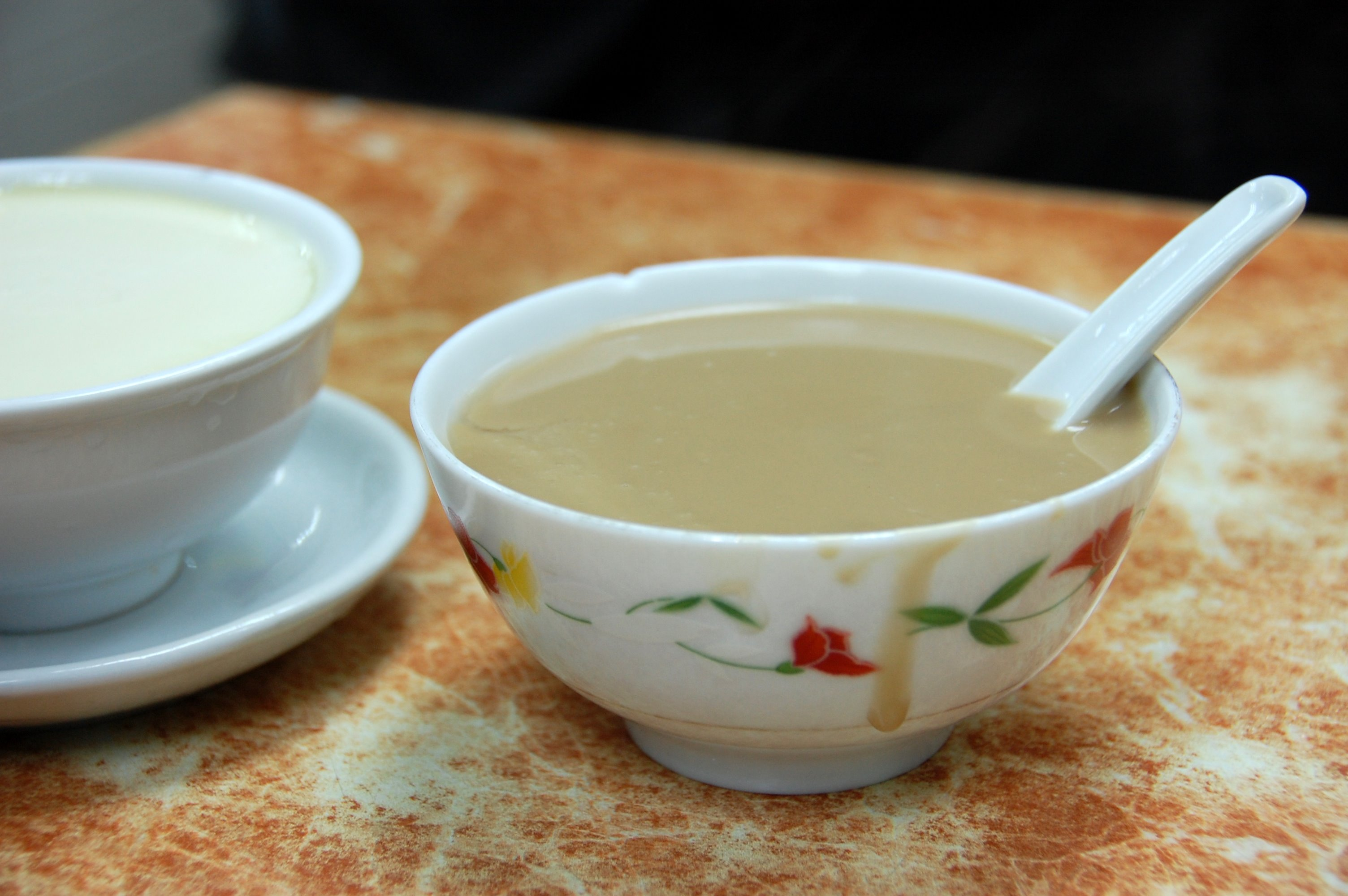
Hup Tul Woo

- Lettuce soup
- Liver soup
- Lotus Root, peanuts, and pork rib soup
- Lotus seed and pork tripe soup
- Lung fung soup
- Mung bean soup
- Noodle soup

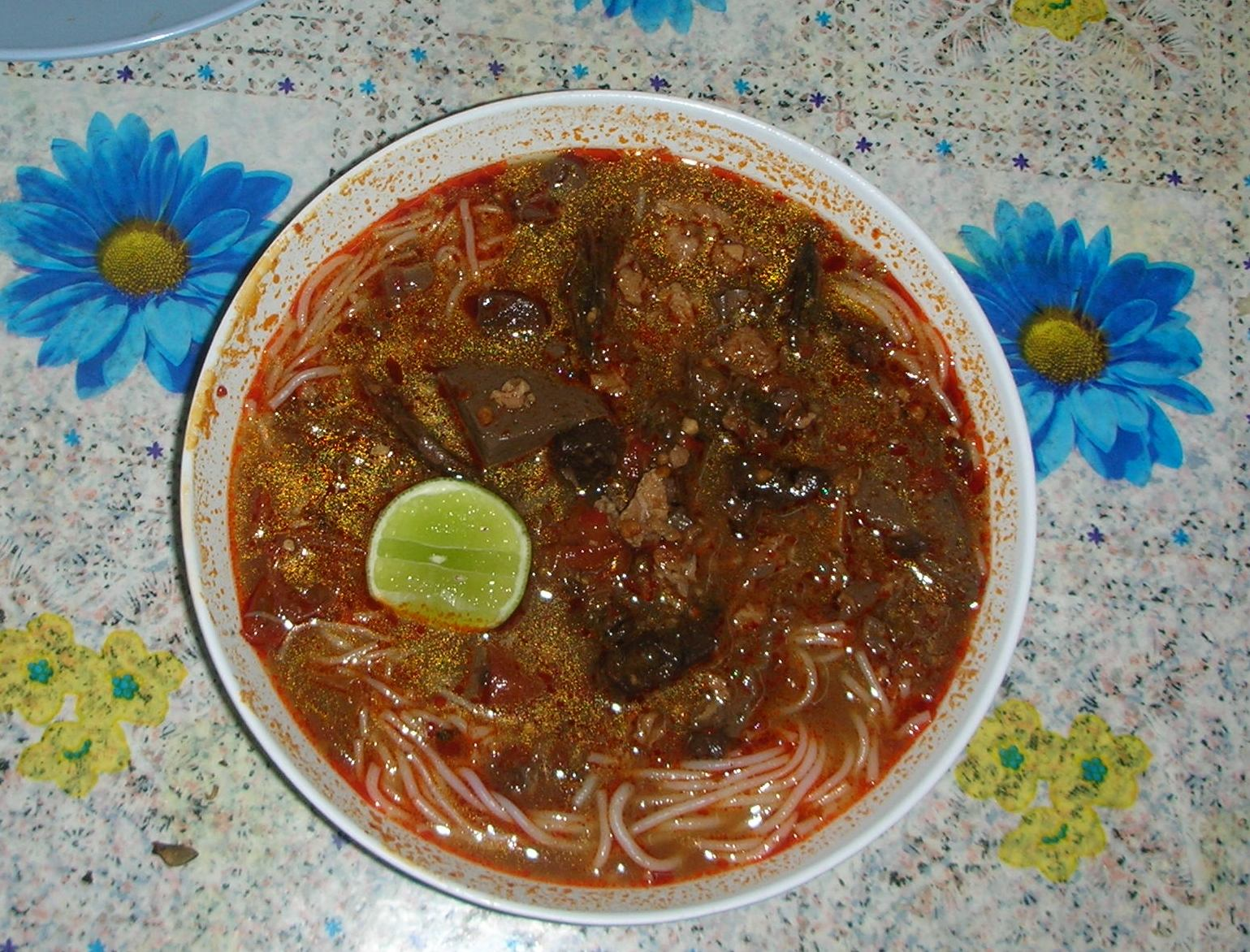
Nam ngiao

- Nam ngiao
- Nangchang Jar soup
- Oxtail soup
- Patriotic soup – developed during the Mongol conquest of the Song dynasty and named by Emperor Bing of Song. It is part of Teochew cuisine and is simple to prepare. Its main ingredients are leaf vegetable, broth, and edible mushrooms.
- Pig's organ soup
- Pigeon soup
- Pork blood soup
- Salted vegetable duck soup
- Shark fin soup
- Silkie soup – Also known as Black chicken soup
- Stewed chicken soup
- Tian mo
- Tomato and egg soup
- Turtle soup – In countries such as Singapore with large Chinese populations, turtle soup is a Chinese delicacy.
- Watercress pork rib soup
- Wenzhou pig intestine rice noodle soup
- Winter melon spare rib soup
- Wonton noodle
- Xidoufen
- Yong Tau Foo

== Tong sui (dessert soup) ==
- Black sesame soup
- Edible bird's nest
- Egg tong sui
- Hup Tul Woo – a sweet walnut soup
- Jiuniang
- Red bean soup

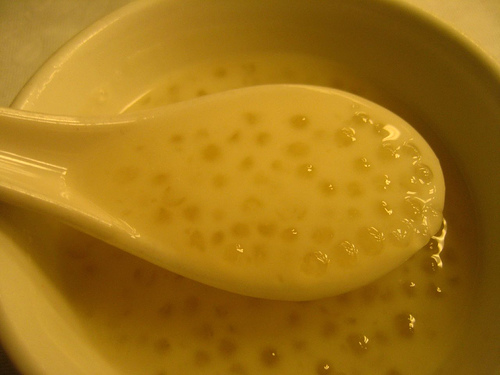
Sago soup

- Sago soup
- Sweet potato soup

== Gallery ==
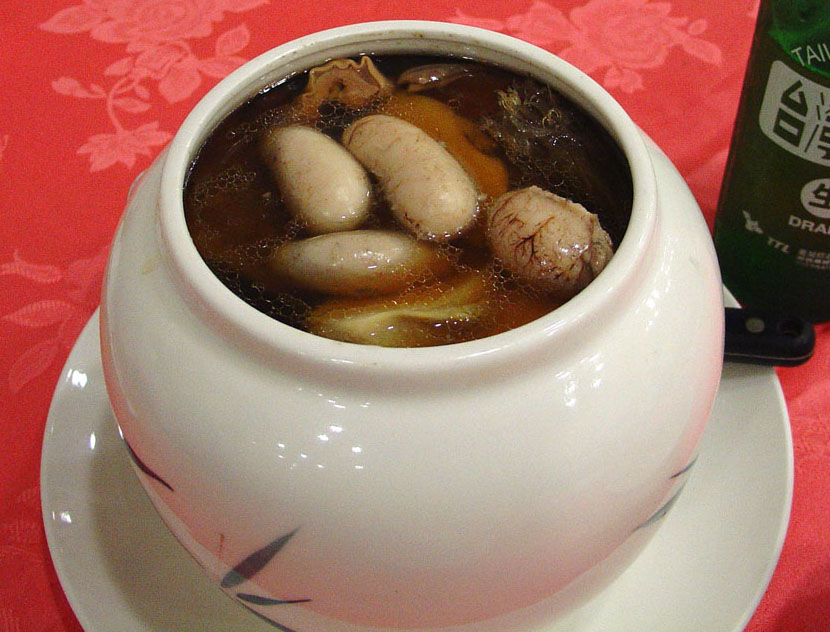
Buddha Jumps Over the Wall

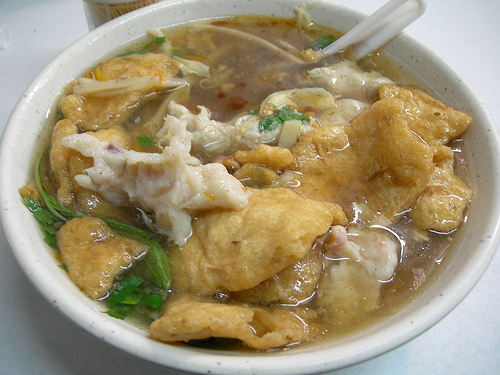
A bowl of meat-based geng

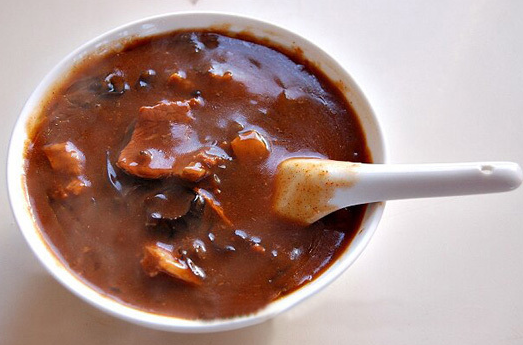
Hulatang

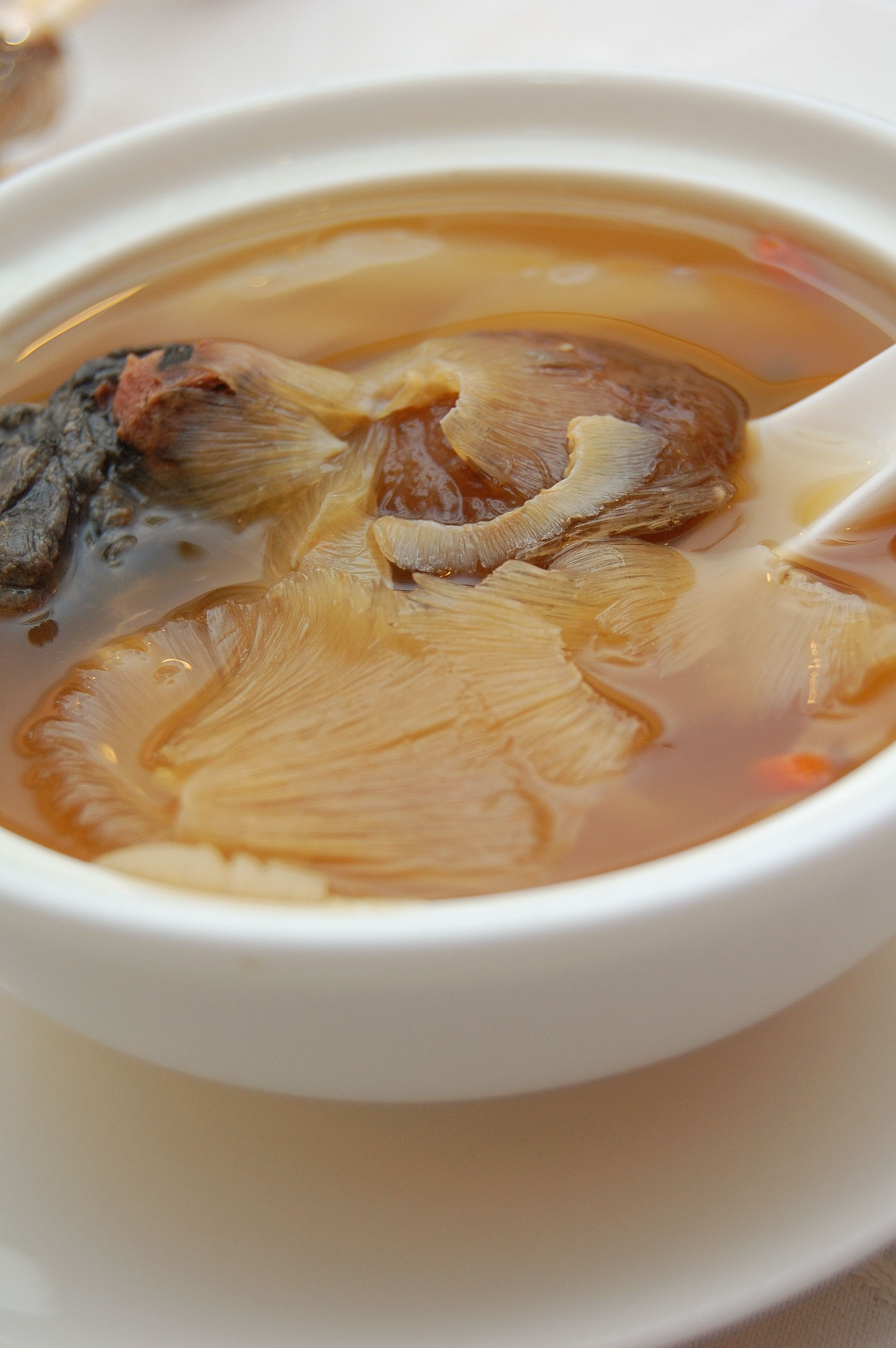
Shark fin soup

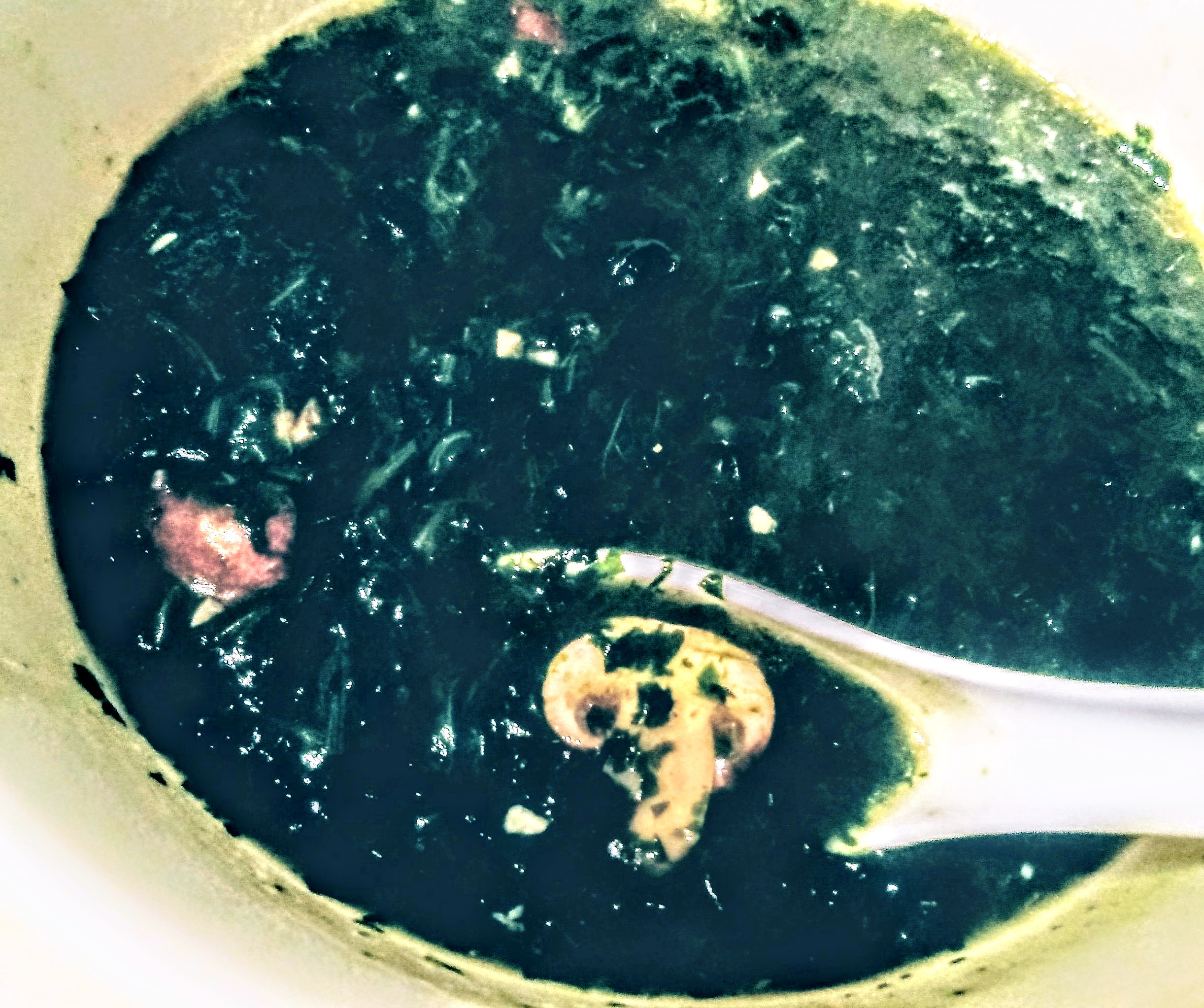
Song dynasty's "patriotic soup"

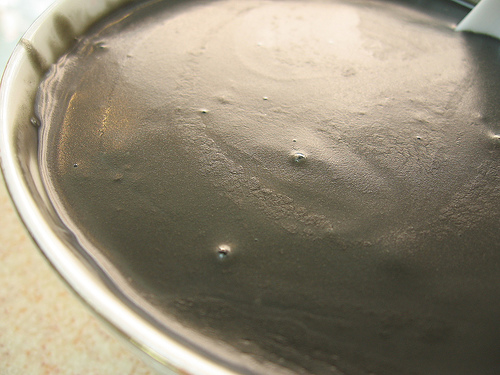
Black sesame soup

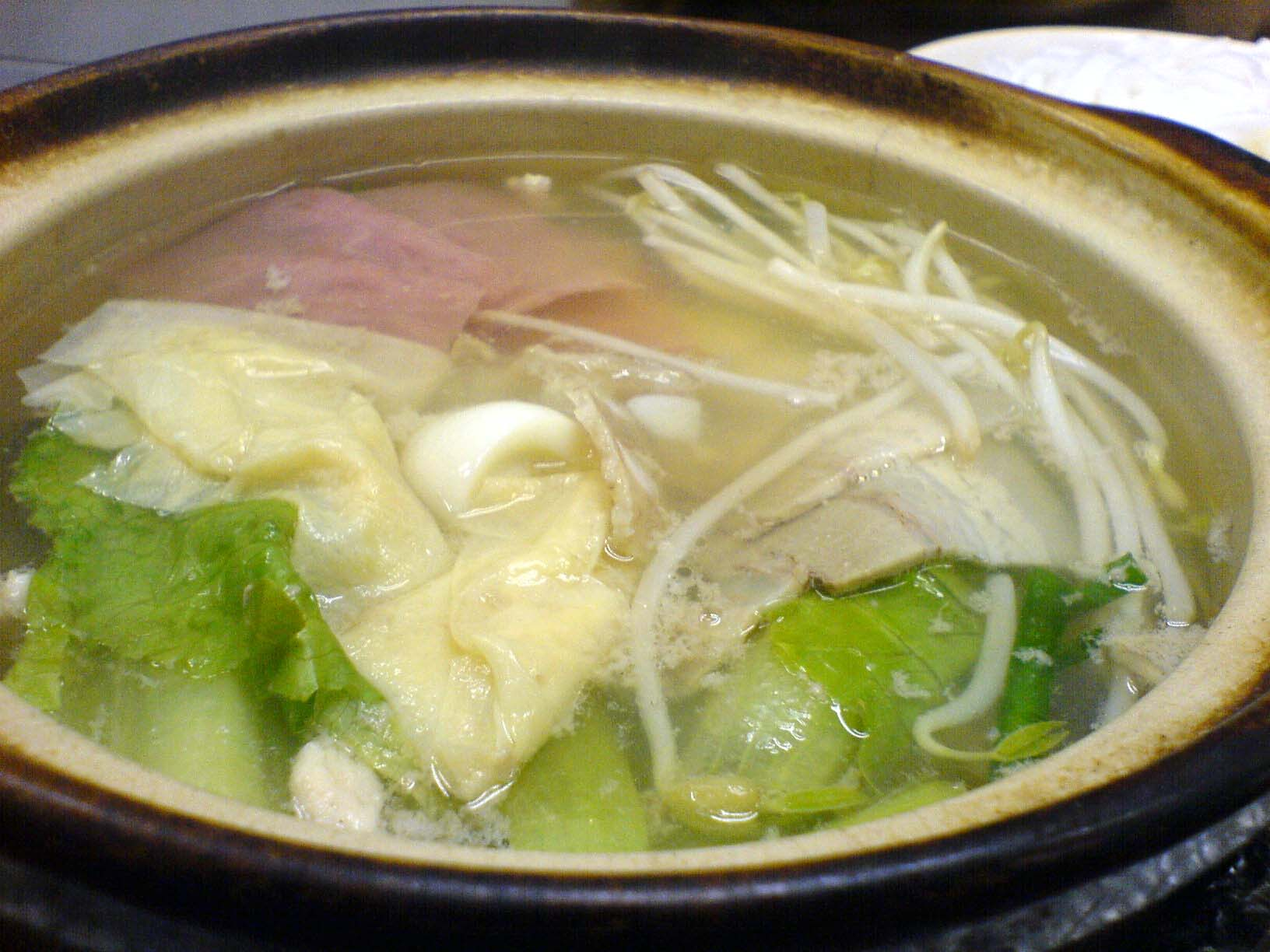
Crossing the bridge noodles

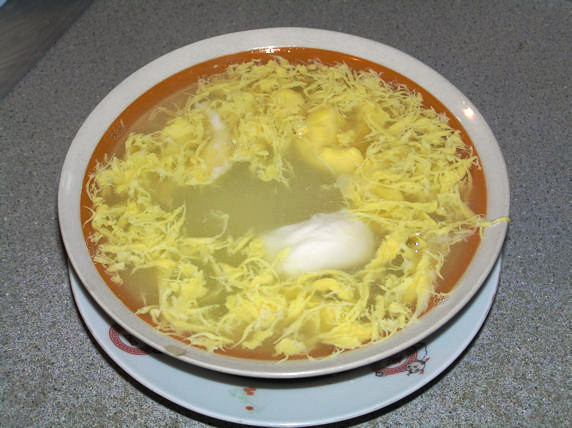
Egg tong sui

== See also ==
- Asian soup
- Chinese spoon
- List of Chinese desserts
- List of Chinese dishes
- List of Chinese sauces
- List of soups
- Tong sui
