= Zhejiang cuisine =

Culinary traditions of Zhejiang province, China

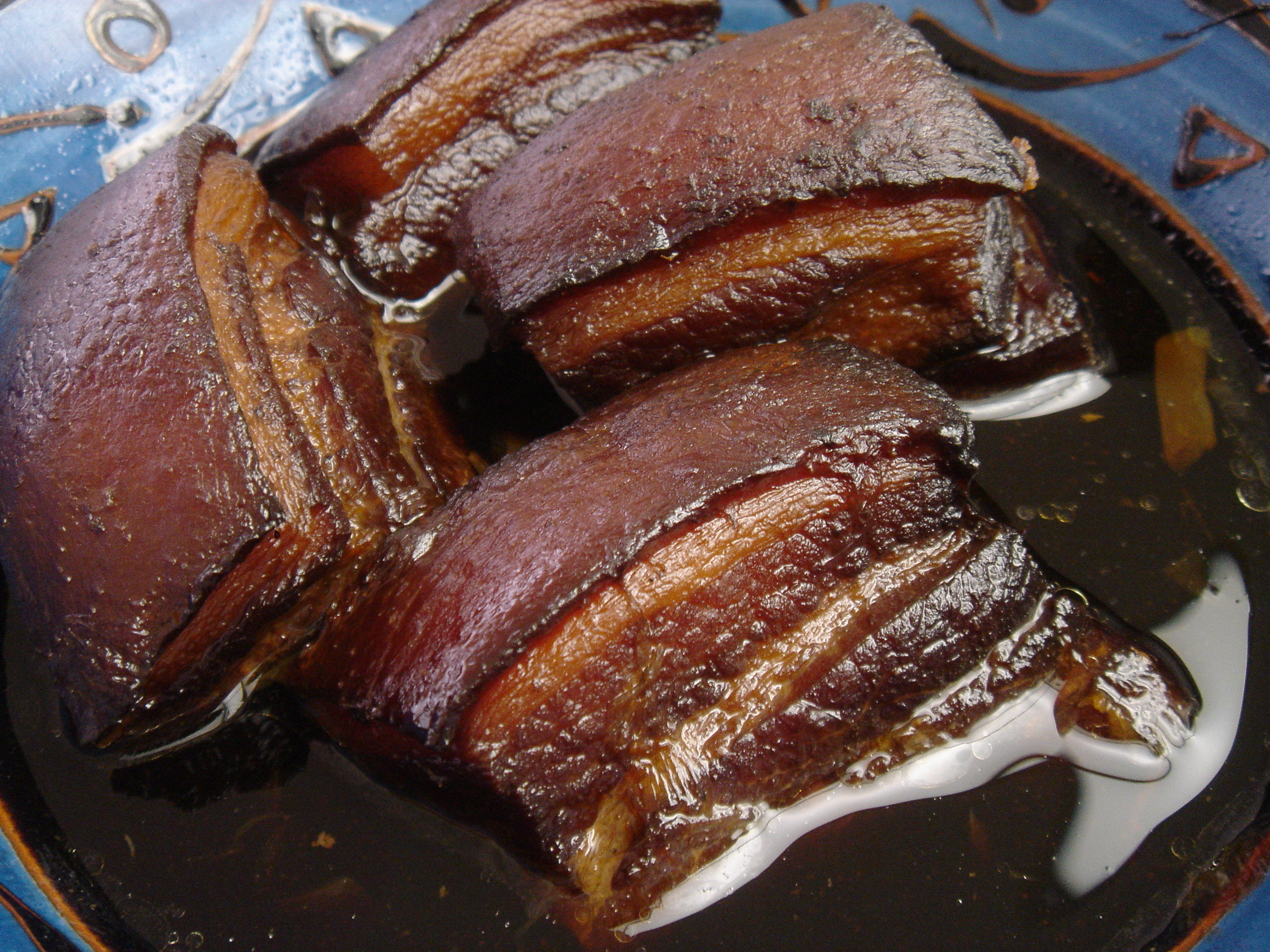
- Dongpo pork, a notable dish in Zhejiang cuisine
- Chinese: 浙江菜
Transcriptions
Standard Mandarin
- Hanyu Pinyin: Zhèjiāng cài

Zhe cuisine
- Chinese: 浙菜
Transcriptions
Standard Mandarin
- Hanyu Pinyin: Zhè cài

Zhejiang cuisine, alternatively known as Zhe cuisine, is one of the Eight Culinary Traditions of Chinese cuisine. Zhejiang cuisine contains four different styles, Hangzhou, Shaoxing, Ningbo, and Wenzhou (also known as Ou cuisine). It derives from the traditional ways of cooking in Zhejiang Province, which is located south of Shanghai and centred around Hangzhou, a historical Chinese capital. In general, Zhejiang cuisine is not greasy but has a fresh and soft flavour with a mellow fragrance.

== Styles ==
Zhejiang cuisine consists of at least three styles, each originating from a major city in the province:

- Hangzhou style: Characterised by rich variations and the use of bamboo shoots. It is served in restaurants such as the Dragon Well Manor.
- Shaoxing style: Specialising in poultry and freshwater fish.
- Ningbo style: Specialising in seafood, with emphasis on freshness and salty dishes.

Some sources also include the Wenzhou style Ou cuisine as a separate subdivision due to its proximity to Fujian Province. Wenzhou style is characterised as the greatest source of seafood as well as poultry and livestock.

== Notable dishes ==
English	Traditional Chinese	Simplified Chinese	Pinyin	Picture	Notes
A hundred birds facing the Phoenix	百鳥朝鳳	百鸟朝凤	bǎi niǎo cháo fèng		Xiaoshan chicken is stewed in a clay pot. Steamed dumplings are then arranged around the chicken, such that it looks like the dumplings ("hundred birds") are facing the chicken ("phoenix").
Beggar's chicken	叫化雞	叫化鸡	jiàohuā jī		Although this dish is originally from Jiangsu Province, it was popularised in Hangzhou and has since been considered part of Hangzhou cuisine.
Dongpo pork	東坡肉	东坡肉	Dōngpō ròu		Fried pork belly stewed in soy sauce and wine.
Dry vegetables and stewed meat	乾菜燜肉	干菜焖肉	gān cài mèn ròu		Meigan cai stewed with pork.
Fiery pupil immortal duck	火瞳神仙鴨	火瞳神仙鸭	huǒ tóng shénxiān yā		Jinhua ham stewed with duck.
Fried shrimp	油爆大蝦	油爆大虾	yóu bào dà xiā		River shrimp is deep fried first and then stir-fried.
Gan zha xiang ling	乾炸響鈴	干炸响铃	gān zhá xiǎng líng		Deep-fried pieces of pork tenderloin wrapped in tofu skin.
Guoba with tomato and shrimp	番茄蝦仁鍋巴	番茄虾仁锅巴	fānqié xiārén guō bā		
Hibiscus mud crab	芙蓉蝤蠓	芙蓉蝤蠓	fúróng qiúměng		Mud crab cooked with egg, green vegetables, chicken stock and Shaoxing wine.
Home-made salted pork with spring bamboo shoots	南肉春筍	南肉春笋	nán ròu chūnsǔn		
Jin yu man tang	金玉滿堂	金玉满堂	jīn yù mǎn táng		A dish composed of shrimp, Chinese perch, deep-fried chicken, pork strips, shumai, ham, crab roe and other ingredients.
Large yellow croaker with pickled mustard greens	鹹菜大湯黃魚	咸菜大汤黄鱼	xiányú dà tāng huángyú		
Longjing shrimp	龍井蝦仁	龙井虾仁	lóngjǐng xiārén		Shrimp cooked in Longjing tea
Mi zhi da fang	蜜汁大方	蜜汁大方	mì zhī dà fāng		Ham is steamed in syrup with lotus seeds, green plums, cherries, osmanthus and other ingredients.
Pearls on a palm	掌上明珠	掌上明珠	zhǎng shàng míng zhū		Fishballs ("pearls") served on a goose web ("palm").
Pregnant fresh fish	懷胎鮮魚	怀胎鲜鱼	huáitāi xiān yú		Steamed sea bass wrapped in pig's caul fat and stuffed with shrimp, Shiitake mushroom, ham and other ingredients.
Razor shells with fried egg	蛋煎蜻子	蛋煎蜻子	dàn jiān qīng zǐ		A dish composed of razor shells, pork lard, water chestnut and egg.
San si qiao yu	三絲敲魚	三丝敲鱼	sān sī qiāo yú		A dish composed of abalone, ham, chicken breast, lean pork, choy sum and other ingredients.
Shao(xing) shrimp balls	紹蝦球	绍虾球	Shào xiā qiú		Shrimp balls wrapped in strips of deep-fried egg paste.
Sister Song's Fish Soup		宋嫂鱼羹			A soup composed of ingredients such as Chinese perch, ham, bamboo shoots, Shiitake mushroom, egg and chicken stock.
Softshell turtle in crystallised sugar	冰糖甲魚	冰糖甲鱼	bīng táng jiǎyú		
Stir-fried eel pieces	生爆鱔片	生爆鳝片	shēng bào shàn piàn		Swamp eel coated in a paste, stir-fried, and served with garlic, sugar and vinegar.
Stir-fried shredded pork with egg white	芙蓉肉	芙蓉肉	fúróng ròu		
Ten views of Shao(xing)	紹十景	绍十景	Shào shí jǐng		A dish composed of fishballs, meatballs, shrimp, fish maw, bamboo shoot, Shiitake mushroom, chicken gizzard and other ingredients.
Zhuzangfen		猪脏粉	Wēnzhōu zhūzàngfěn		A rice noodle soup containing pig intestine and duck or pig blood popular in Wenzhou.
West Lake chuncai soup	西湖蒓菜湯	西湖莼菜汤	Xīhú chúncài tāng		Soup made with strips of ham, chicken breast and chuncai.
West Lake fish in vinegar	西湖醋魚	西湖醋鱼	Xīhú cù yú		A grass carp served in syrup.

Ningbo cuisine is regarded as rather salty. Ningbo confectioneries were celebrated all over China during the Qing dynasty.
