= List of fish and seafood soups =

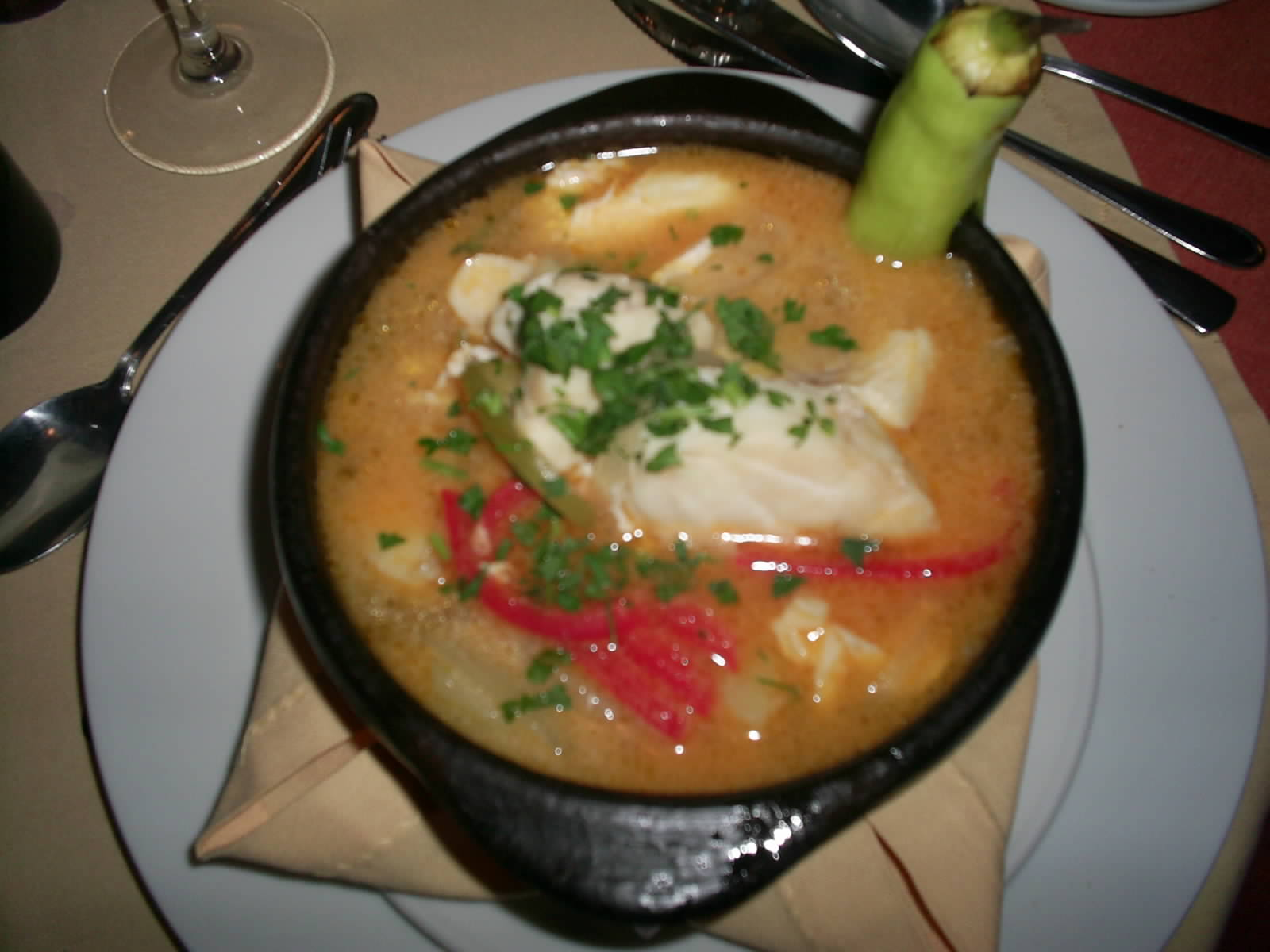
Caldillo de congrio

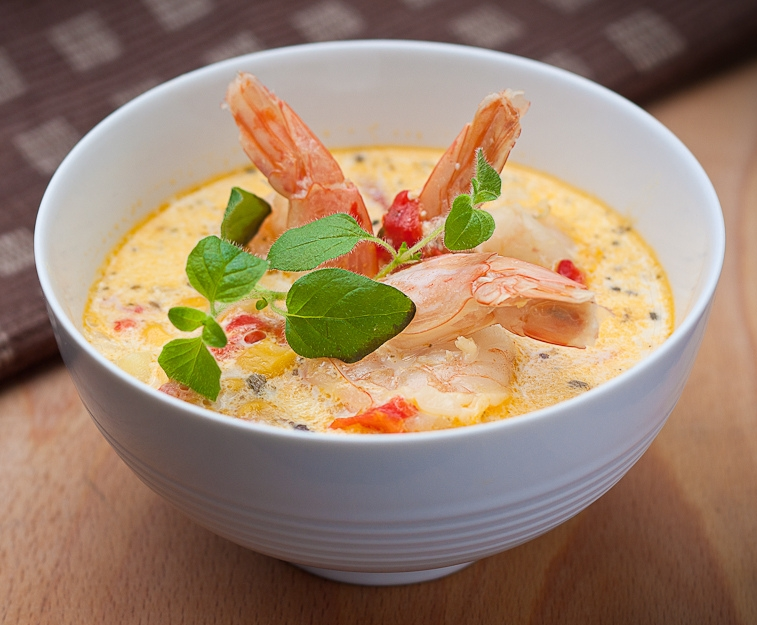
A seafood chowder prepared with shrimp and corn

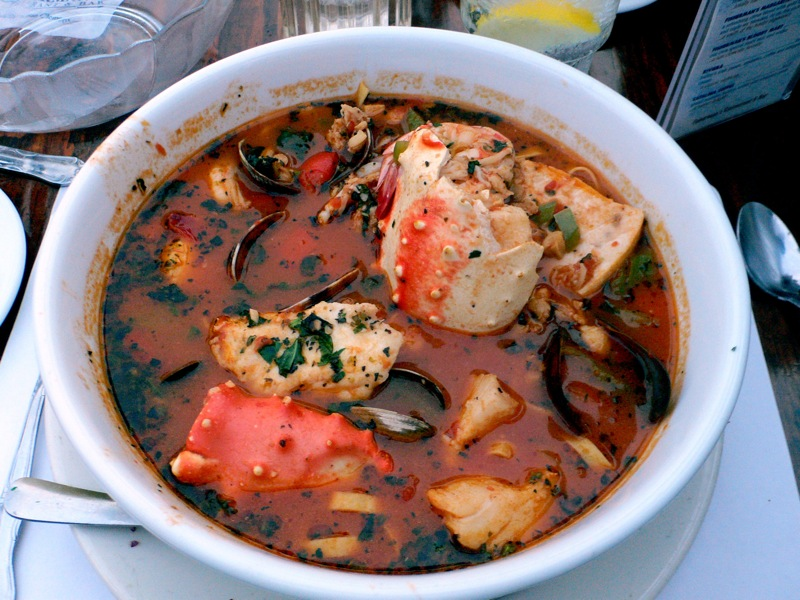
Cioppino

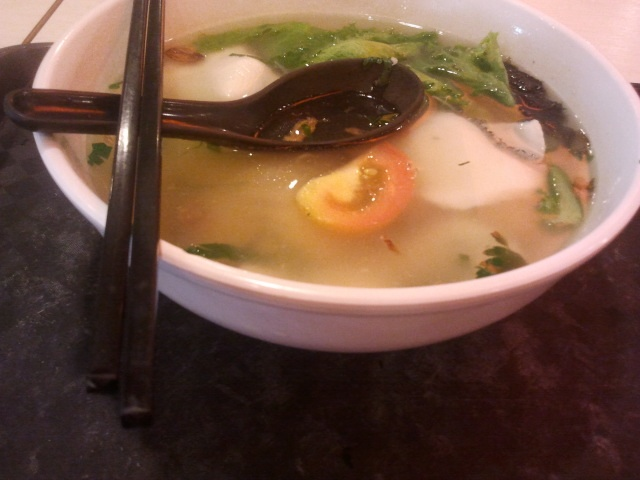
Fish soup bee hoon

This is a dynamic list of soups made with fish or seafood and may never be able to satisfy particular standards for completeness. You can help by adding missing items with reliable sources:

- Bisque, usually lobster bisque
- Bouillabaisse — a Provencal dish, especially in the port of Marseille
- Buridda
- Caldillo de congrio
- Caldillo de perro
- Cantonese seafood soup
- Chowder
  - Bermuda fish chowder
  - Clam chowder
  - Fish chowder
  - Spiced haddock chowder
- Chupe
- Cioppino
- Clam soup
- Cullen skink
- Dashi
- Fish soup
- Fish soup bee hoon
- Fish tea
- Halászlé - Hungarian spicy fish soup
- Gumbo – often includes seafood, made with shrimp or crab stock
- Ikan kuah kuning — a Maluku and Papua dish
- Herring soup
- Jaecheopguk
- Lohikeitto
- Lung fung soup
- Maeutang
- Mohinga
- Moqueca
- Paila marina
- Phở – some versions use seafood
- Pindang
- Psarosoupa
- She-crab soup
- Sliced fish soup
- Sopa marinera — a Spanish seafood dish made with oysters, clams, seashells, crab, lobster, shrimp and spices like achiote and cumin
- Sopa de peixe - Portuguese fish soup, usually made using a tomato base. Very rich, it can include a variety of different seafood at the same time, and be a meal in itself.
- Tom Yum
- Ukha

== See also ==
- Fish soup
- List of cream soups
  - List of fish soups
- List of soups
- List of seafood dishes
- List of stews
