= Héctor Vega (footballer, born 1967) =

Chilean footballer

Personal information
- Full name: Héctor Luis Vega Astudillo
- Date of birth: 13 December 1967 (age 58)
- Place of birth: Iquique, Chile
- Position: Attacking midfielder

Youth career
- Unión Pueblo Nuevo
- Deportes Iquique

Senior career*
Years	Team	Apps	(Gls)
1985–1991	Deportes Iquique	100	(14)
1991	Hijos de Yurimaguas		
1992	Deportivo Yurimaguas		
1993	Deportes Iquique	22	(5)
1994	Coquimbo Unido	16	(0)
1995	Deportivo Sipesa		
1996	Sport Boys		
1997–1998	Deportes Iquique	57	(23)
1999	Deportivo Quito		
1999–2000	Santiago Wanderers	50	(20)
2001	Deportes Iquique	25	(2)
2002	Everton		
- * Club domestic league appearances and goals

Héctor Luis Vega Astudillo (born 13 December 1967) is a Chilean former professional footballer who played as an attacking midfielder for clubs in Chile, Peru and Ecuador.

== Career ==
Vega was born in Pueblo Nuevo neighborhood from Iquique and played for the local club, Unión Pueblo Nuevo.

A product of Deportes Iquique youth system, he made his debut in 1985. When the club was relegated to the second level of the Chilean football, in 1992 he moved to Peru and joined Deportivo Yurimaguas. In Peru, he also played for Deportivo Sipesa (1995) and Sport Boys (1996). To Deportes Iquique, he returned three times: 1993, 1997 and 2001.

After playing for S.D. Quito, in 1999 he returned to Chile and joined Santiago Wanderers in the Primera B, getting promotion to the Primera División after the club was the runner-up of the season. His last club was Everton de Viña del Mar in 2002.

== Personal life ==
Vega is well-known by his nickname Caldillo (Fish Soup) what was inherited from his father, who also played football for Deportes El Loa, the club previous to Cobreloa.

He is the father of the Peruvian-Chilean former professional footballer of the same name Héctor Fabrizzio Vega, who was born in Lima, Peru, when his father played for Deportivo Yurimaguas.

In 2001, he earned 457 millions Chilean pesos by playing Loto, a game of chance. After mismanagement of the award money, he worked as manager of a pizzeria, as a truck driver in the mining industry and in the port of Iquique (ITI).

In the context of COVID-19 pandemic, he and his son started a football academy named "Imperio H" in Iquique, making links with clubs in both Chile and Mexico.

== Honours ==
Deportes Iquique

- Primera B de Chile: 1997 Clausura
