= Fish stew =

Stew made using fish or seafood

Fish stew is a stew with a soup base or ingredient of fish as food.

== List ==
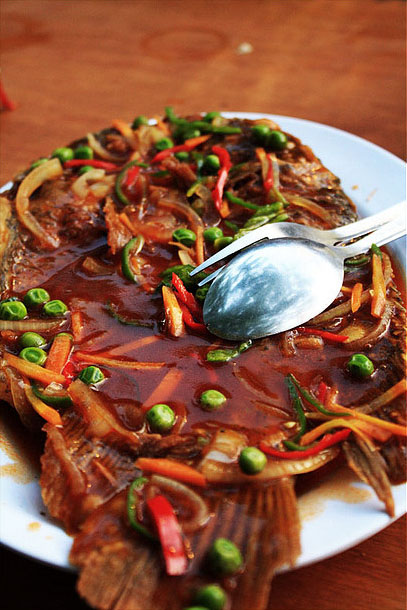
Asam Pedas

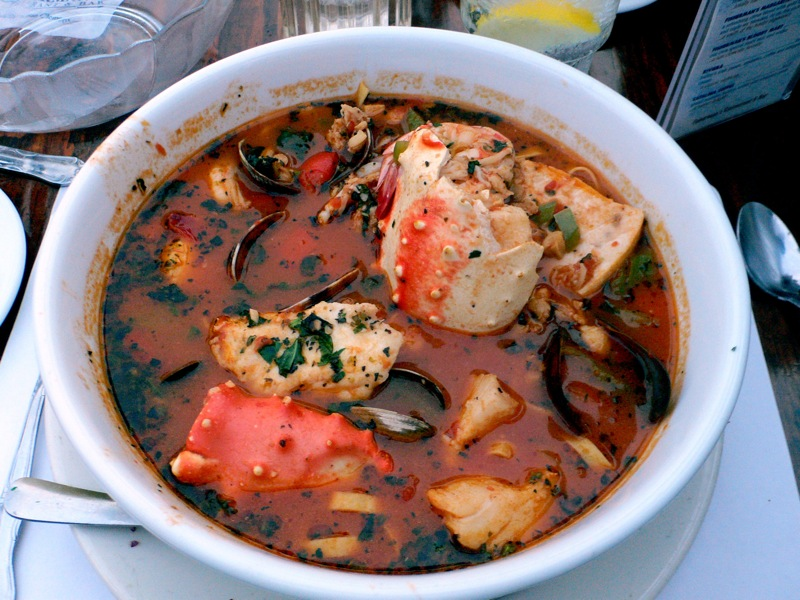
Cioppino

Types of fish stew from around the world include:

- Asam Pedas (Indonesian) and (Malaysian)
- Bouillabaisse (Provençal fish stew originating from Marseille, France)
- Bourride (another fish stew from Provence)
- Brudet (Italian, from Adriatic Sea)
- Buridda (Italian, from Liguria)
- Cacciucco (Italian, from Livorno)
- Caldeirada (Portuguese)
- Caldo de mariscos (Mexican) stew, also known as caldo de siete mares
- Chepa pulus (tamarind-based South Indian fish stew from Andhra Pradesh)
- Cioppino (San Francisco version of an Italian fish stew)
- Cotriade (from Brittany)
- Fish head curry
- Ghalieh mahi (Persian)
- Haemul jeongol (Korean)
- Halászlé (Hungarian paprika-based river fish soup)
- Kokotxas (a traditional Basque fish stew)
- Maeuntang (spicy Korean soup)
- Meen Kuḻambu (traditional Tamil Kuzhambu stew, made with fish)
- Moqueca (traditional Brazilian stew)
- Riblji paprikaš (spicy Croatian fish stew from Slavonia)
- Saengseon jjigae (Korean, similar to jeongol)
- Shui zhu yu (Sichuan Chinese)
- Suquet de peix (Valencian stew, similar to bouillabaisse)
- Tuna pot
- Ukha, Russian fish soup
- Waterzooi (Flemish fish stew)
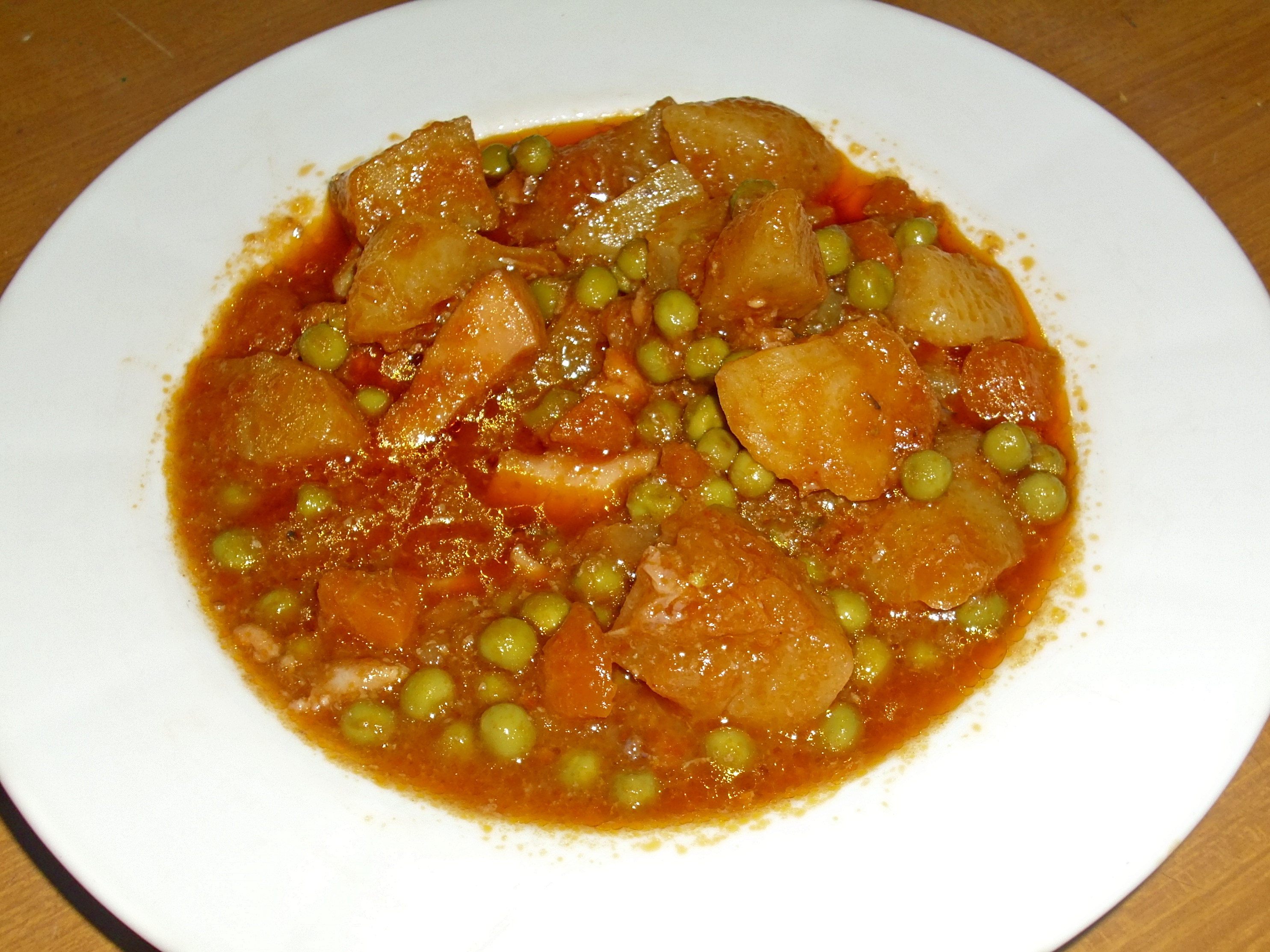
Buridda

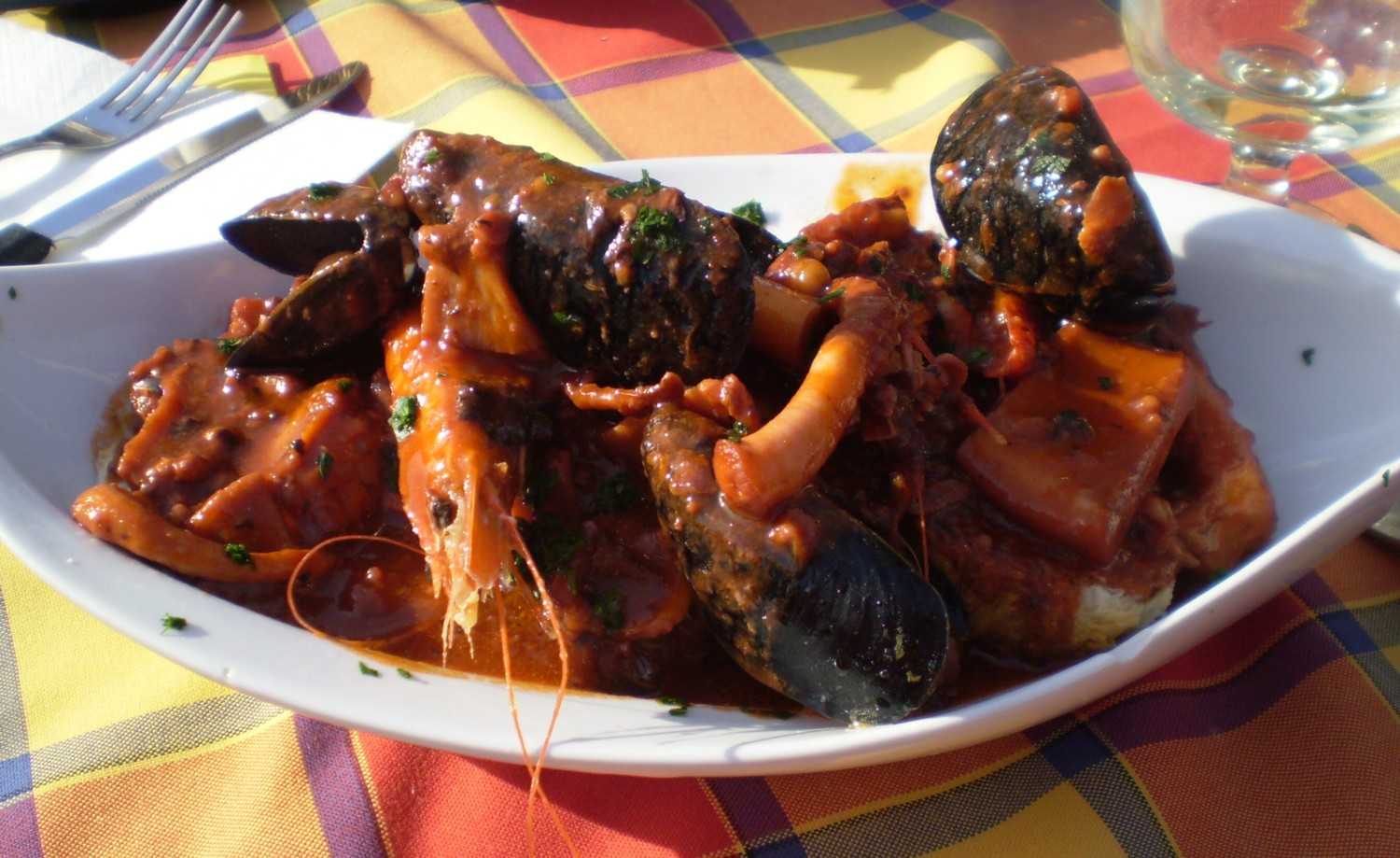
Cacciucco

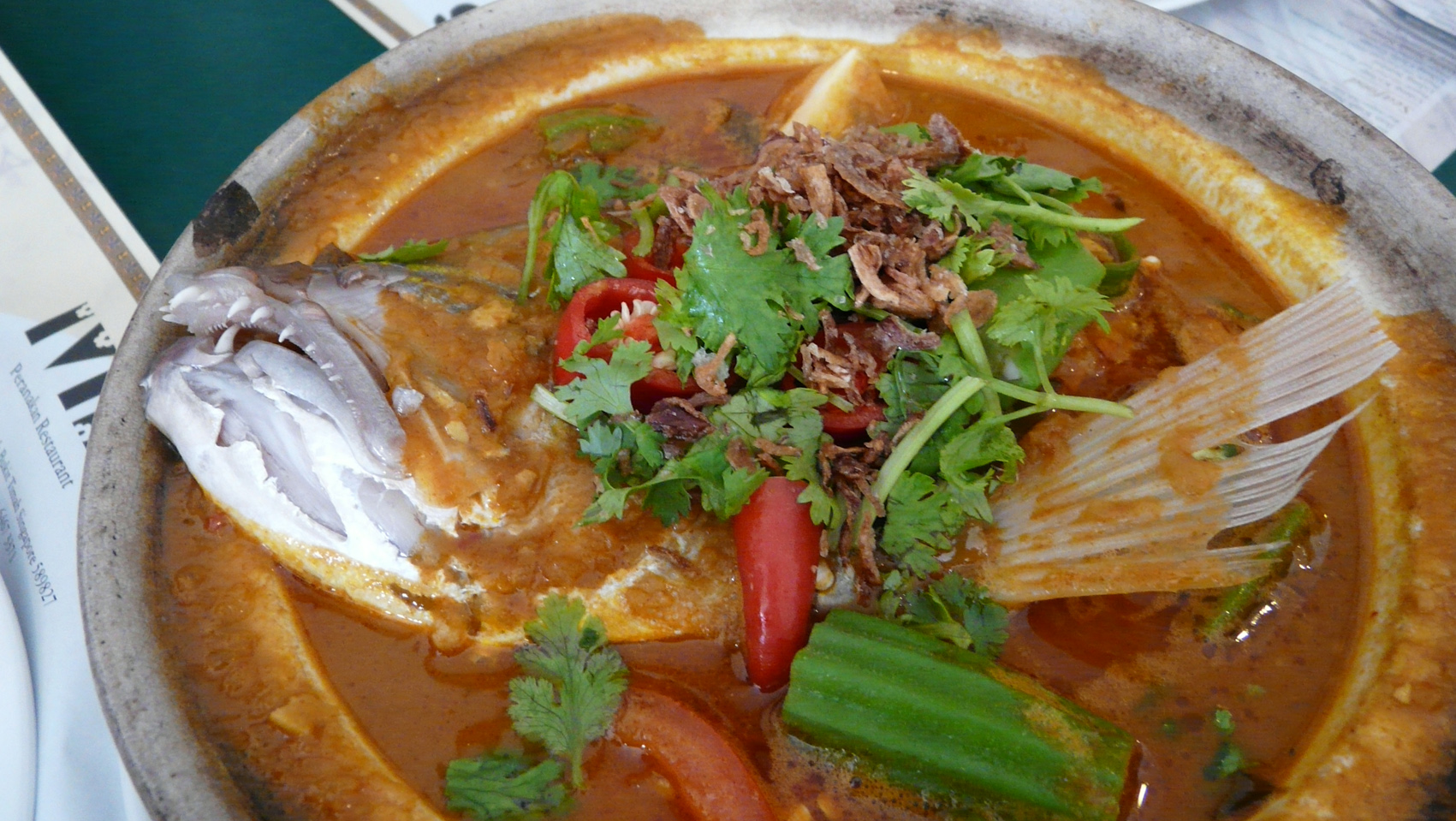
Fish head curry peranakan in Singapore

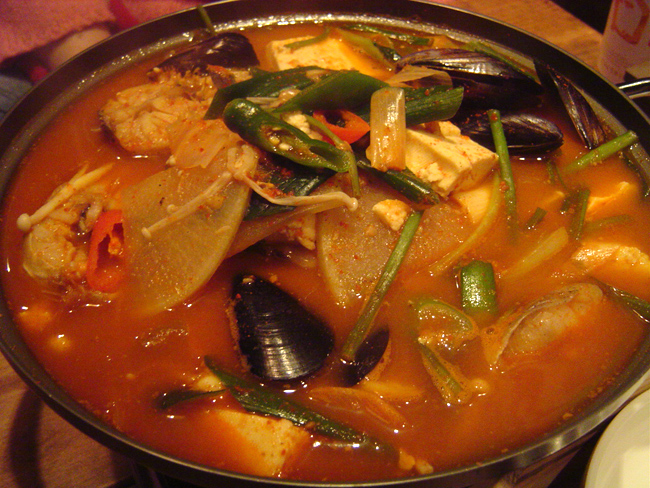
Hot dongtae jjigae – Korean pollack stew

== See also ==
- Fish soup
- List of fish and seafood soups
- List of soups
- List of stews
- Chowder
