= Héctor Vega (footballer, born 1992) =

Peruvian-Chilean footballer

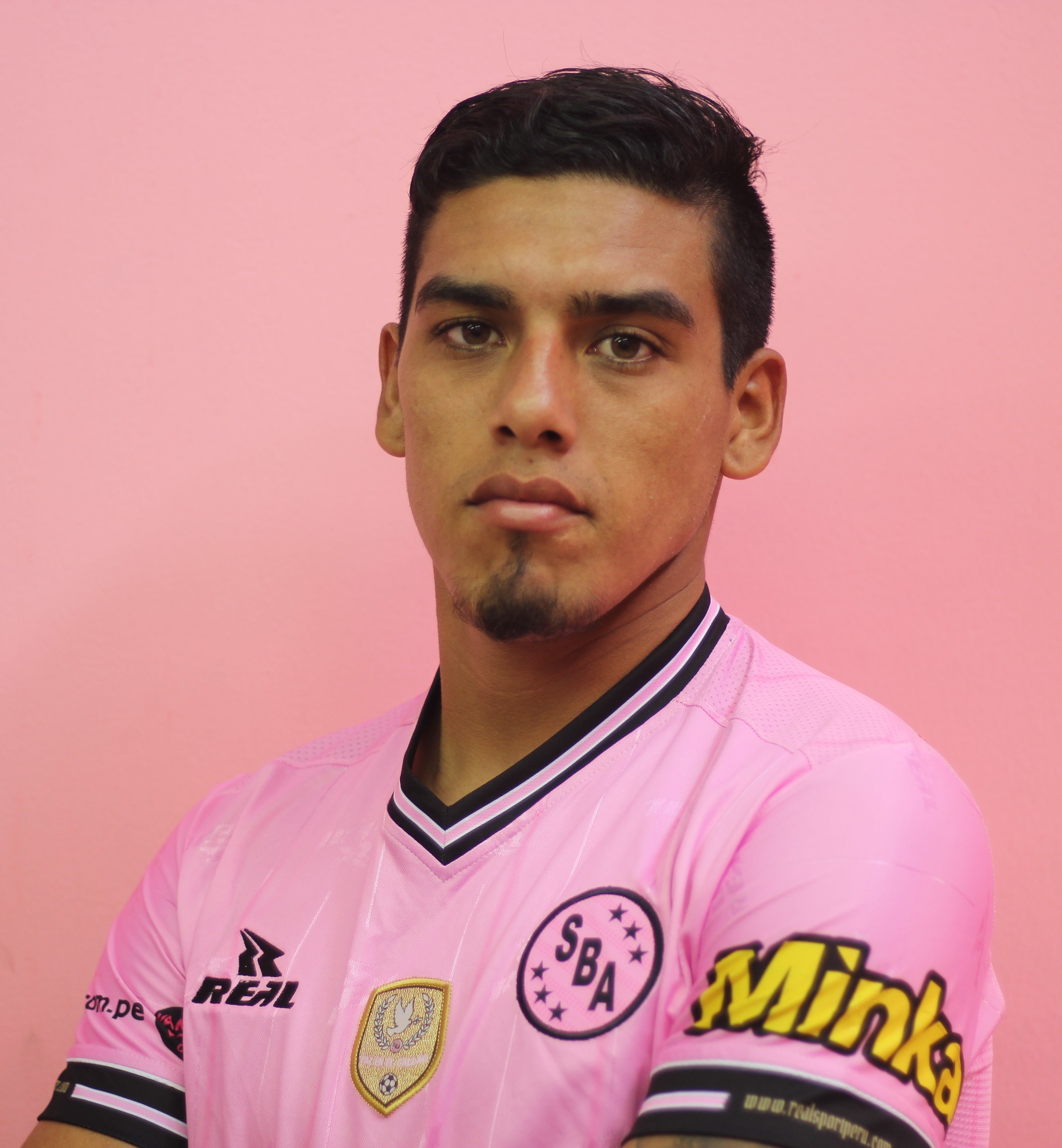
- Vega with Sport Boys in 2016

Personal information
- Full name: Héctor Fabrizzio Vega Guerra
- Date of birth: 2 July 1992 (age 34)
- Place of birth: Lima, Peru
- Height: 1.86 m (6 ft 1 in)
- Position: Forward

Youth career
- Deportes Iquique
- Lecce

Senior career*
Years	Team	Apps	(Gls)
2010	Deportes Iquique	0	(0)
2011–2012	Cobresol	12	(1)
2013	Sport Boys	0	(0)
2013	Walter Ormeño	–	(–)
2014	Sport Loreto	–	(–)
2014	Pacífico	26	(4)
2015	Kitsap Pumas	–	(–)
2015	Unión Tarapoto	–	(–)
2016	Sport Boys	5	(1)
2016	Argentino de Rosario	9	(3)
2017	Trasandino	13	(9)
2017–2018	Unión San Felipe	24	(7)
2019	Deportes Valdivia	5	(0)
2019	Husqvarna FF	1	(0)
2020	Juventus Managua	5	(0)
2020–2021	San Antonio Unido	17	(1)
- * Club domestic league appearances and goals

Héctor Fabrizzio Vega Guerra (born 2 July 1992) is a Peruvian-Chilean former professional footballer who mainly played for clubs in Chile and Peru as a forward.

== Career ==
Mainly a centre forward, Vega was born in Lima, Peru, to Chilean parents. He was with the football academies of ENAMI, Colo Colo, Quilpué, Deportes La Serena and Universidad Católica before moving to Iquique and joined the Deportes Iquique youth ranks, having a brief step with US Lecce in Italy.

A product of Deportes Iquique youth system, he took part of the first team in 2010. After no having played in the Primera B de Chile, in 2011 he moved to Peru and joined Cobresol in the Peruvian Primera División. In his country of birth, he also played for Sport Boys, Walter Ormeño, Sport Loreto, Pacífico and Unión Tarapoto. In Chile, he also played for Trasandino, Unión San Felipe and Deportes Valdivia.

In other countries, he played for Kitsap Pumas in the USL League Two, Argentino de Rosario in the Argentine Primera D, Husqvarna FF in the Swedish Division 2 and Juventus Managua in the Liga Primera.

During the COVID-19 pandemic, he left Juventus Managua in March 2020. Then he returned to Chile and joined San Antonio Unido for the 2020 season of the Segunda División Profesional.

== Personal life ==
Vega holds dual Peruvian-Chilean nationality since his parents are Chilean and he was born in Lima, Peru, when his father, the former professional footballer of the same name Héctor Luis Vega, played for Deportivo Yurimaguas. From both his father and his grandfather, he inherited his nickname Caldillo (Fish Soup).

During the COVID-19 pandemic, he and his father started a football academy named "Imperio H" in Iquique, making links with clubs in both Chile and Mexico.

== Honours ==
Deportes Iquique

- Primera B de Chile: 2010

Sport Loreto

- Copa Perú: 2014
