= Eel soup =

Fish dish

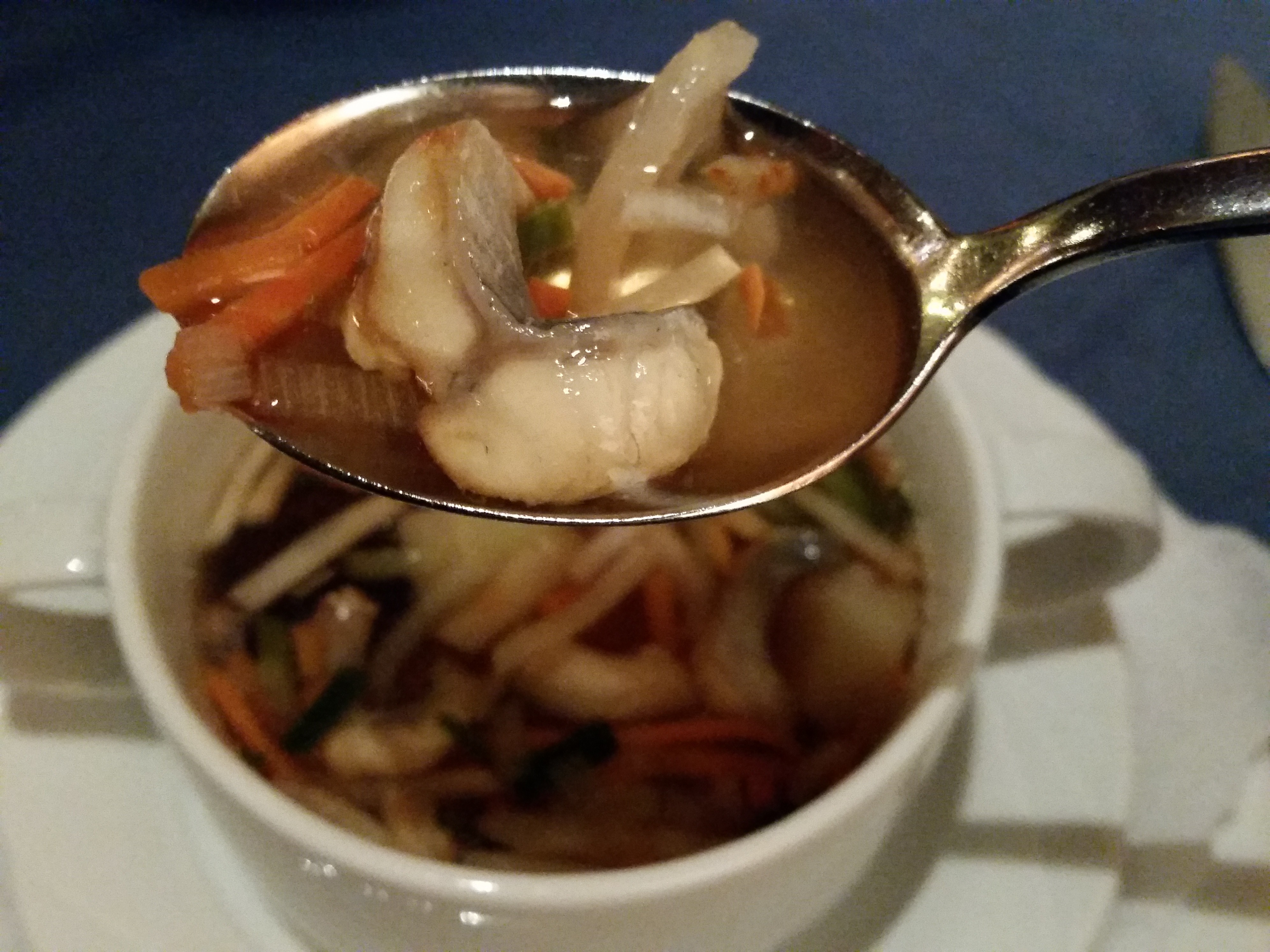
Hamburger Aalsuppe

Eel soups are a type of fish soup eaten in the cuisines of countries of Asia, Europe, and the Americas.

== Europe ==
In France, eel has been eaten in soup since at least the 14th century. Eel soups appear in several suggestions for banquet layouts in Le Ménagier de Paris (1393), and a recipe is given for "Light green eel broth". In a modern translation, this is given as: "Skin—id est, flay or scald—the eels and put them to cook in water with wine, in very small pieces. Then grind parsley and toasted bread, and sieve. Have on hand ground peeled ginger and saffron, and boil it all together, and when almost done, add morsels of cubed cheese." Eels are still eaten in soup in France, included as an element of Bouillabaisse, and in the northern-Rhone specialty matelote d'anguille.

As of the 1960s, eel soup was being eaten in the Netherlands under the name Paling soep, particularly around Lent. In Italy, eel soup is prepared in Comacchio, a town on the River Po where large numbers of eels are caught. Carrots, celery, onion, parsley and lemon are sliced, and added to a cooking vessel with eel and water. Midway through cooking, vinegar and tomato paste are added, producing a final soup that Claudia Roden called "splendid". In A Gift to Young Housewives, a Russian cookbook compiled in 1861 by Elena Ivanovna Molokhovets, several recipes for eel soup are given, including clear eel soup and eel and green pea soup.

=== Germany ===
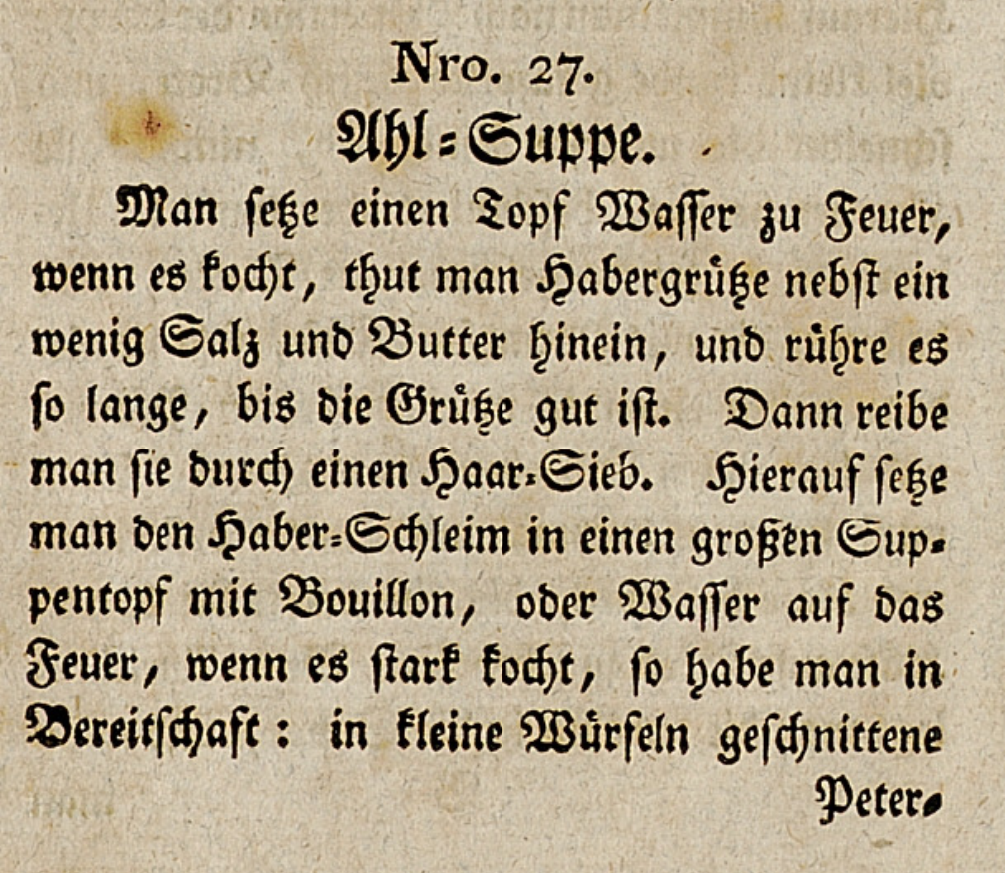
A 1788 recipe for Eel Soup in a Hamburg cookbook

The German Hamburg Aalsuppe is made by adding cooked pieces of eel to a sweet and sour soup. Ham bones, dried stone fruits, herbs, and dumplings made from flour are often included, and the eel is sometimes smoked. Recipes have appeared since at least 1788 in Hamburg; according to Alan Davidson, Aalsuppe emerged as a variation of an older German sweet and sour soup tradition, through the addition of eel. Jane Grigson considered this soup "delicate and delicious" and among the best fish soups, based on a preparation made with dried pears. According to a folk etymology, the soup was originally made from leftover ingredients with "everything in it" (alls drin), except eel. An eel soup eaten in Denmark under the name Ålesuppe is described by Davidson as "clearly related" to the German Hamburg Aalsuppe.

=== England ===
In England, a recipe for eel soup appears in the Forme of Cury, c. 1390, under the name "Balloc broth". It instructed:

Take eelys and hilde hem, and kerue hem to pecys, and do hem to seeth in water and wyne so that it be a litel ouerstepid. Do therto sawge and oother erbis, with fewe oynouns ymynced. Whan the eelis buth soden ynowg, do hem in a vessel; take a pyke and kerue it to gobettes and seeth hym in the same broth. Do therto powdour gynger, galyngale, canel and peper; salt it and cast the eelys therto & messe it forth.

Recipes for eel soups continued to feature in English cookbooks over the course of the following centuries. One appeared in A Proper newe Booke of Cokerye (1557-1558 ed), as a pottage of eels and lamprey and in The English Huswife by Gervase Markham as a suggested ingredient for A broth for any fresh fish. Eel soups were particularly popular in England during the 1700s. During that century, John Nott included a recipe in his 1723 cookbook The Cooks and Confectioners Dictionary, and Hannah Glasse included a recipe in The Art of Cookery Made Plain and Easy (1747) under the title "An Eel Soop". Glasses's eel soup was given alongside several other eel dishes, and was flavoured with herbs, mace, onion and pepper, alongside the advice that "a Pound of Eels will make a Pint of good Soop".

During the 19th century, cookshops sold hot eel soup to the poor of London, in a dish described in a contemporary source as "cheap and nasty". A recipe for an eel soup made with Conger eels, flavoured and coloured with the petals of the marigold flowers appears within Mrs. Beeton's Book of Household Management (1861), and continues to be eaten in South West England.

== Asia ==
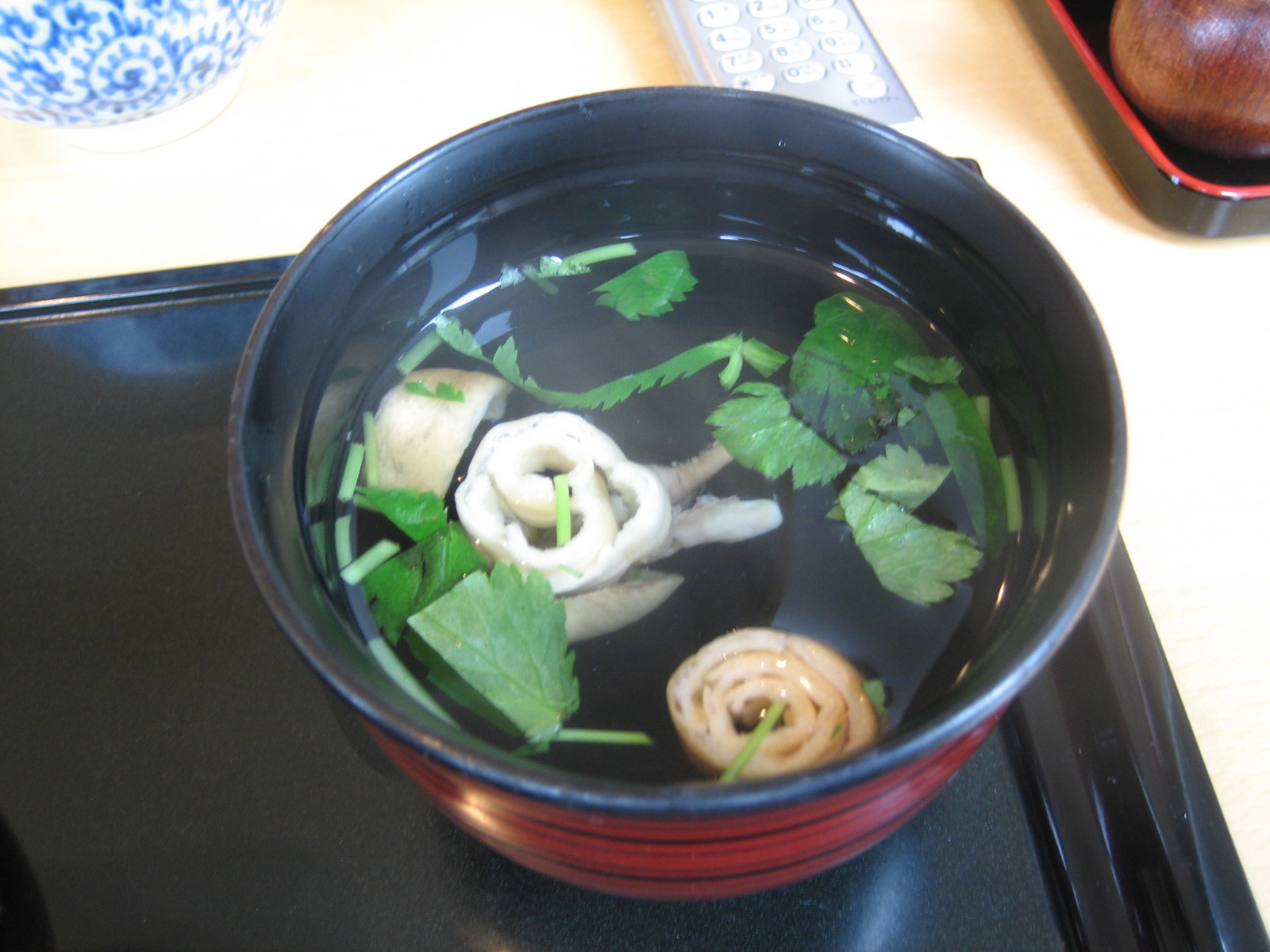
Kimosui: A Japanese eel liver soup

Eel soups have been eaten in Japan since at least the 1600s. Eel soups are still eaten in Japan, served in restaurants that specialize in the fish. One version is known as kimosui, which uses the liver of the eel. Eel soups are also eaten in Vietnam. A basic eel soup is particularly common within upscale establishments, while another, a rice porridge named cháo, often contains pieces of eel.

Eel soups are also consumed in China, as have been since at least the first millenium. In the 6th century, the Buddhist Emperor Wu of Liang, argued killing animals was immoral. With this came a popular wave of vegetarianism, and stories began to circulate of karmic justice, including one mentioning eel soup, wherein the son of an eel soup seller was born with the head of an eel. Today, eel soup is particularly prevalent in southern China, where the long stretch of coastline gives access to large quantities of seafood. In a common preparation, the eel soup of the region is flavoured with angelica root.

== Americas ==
In the New England region, Native Americans historically made thick soups out of the local eels. One of these preparations was recorded by the English settler Daniel Gookin, who in 1677 reported eels being eaten in a maize gruel, cut in pieces without first removing their bones. Eel soups were still being eaten in the 19th century by Americans living on the country's east coast, and in the early 20th century by the Penobscot people. Writing in 1910, the anthropologist Frank Speck described their food preparation habits: "Eels are split open, the backbones being taken out and saved to put into corn soup, and the carcasses hung up on a frame like the smoking rack to dry or to be smoked. In winter they are frozen. Boiled over again and they make excellent soup." Among the Pennsylvania Dutch, a dish of smoked eel soup with hominy (g'schmokte-ohlesupp mit hahmini) continues to be prepared, as an elaborate adaptation of earlier native American eel preparations.

In Canada, eel soups continue to be prepared among some Mi'kmaq who reside on Cape Breton Island. These are prepared using small eels, while large eels are baked.

In Chile in South America, the fish and potato soup Caldillo de congrio contains pieces of conger eel in a broth flavored with tomato, onion and garlic. The dish is famous in the region, and was a favorite of the poet Pablo Neruda, who wrote Oda al Caldillo de Congrio (lit. 'Ode to the Conger Eel Soup') in honour of a version containing shrimp and cream swirled through before serving.

== See also ==
- Eel as food

== Sources ==
- Aizawa, Katsue (2014). "Eels in Japan". In Davidson, Alan; Jaine, Tom (eds.). The Oxford Companion to Food (3rd ed.). Oxford University Press. ISBN 978-0-19-967733-7.
- Avieli, Nir (2019). "Vietnamese Cuisine". In Christensen, Karen; Anderson, E N; Buell, Paul D (eds.). Asian Cuisines: Food Culture from East Asia to Turkey and Afghanistan. Berkshire Essentials. Great Barrington, Massachusetts: Berkshire Publishing Group. ISBN 978-1-61472-030-0.
- Bissell, Frances (2012) [2007]. The Scented Kitchen: Cooking with Flowers (Expanded ed.). London: Serif. ISBN 978-1-897959-54-1.
- Black, Rachel (2021). Cheffes de Cuisine: Women and Work in the Professional French Kitchen. Urbana, Illinois: University of Illinois Press. ISBN 978-0-252-04400-7.
- Clements, Jonathan (2022) [2021]. The Emperor's Feast: A History of China in Twelve Meals. London: Hodder. ISBN 978-1-5293-3243-8.
- Davidson, Alan (1980) [1979]. North Atlantic Seafood. Harmondsworth, Greater London: Penguin Books. ISBN 0-14-046298-8.
- Davidson, Alan (2014). "Marigold". In Davidson, Alan; Jaine, Tom (eds.). The Oxford Companion to Food (3rd ed.). Oxford University Press. ISBN 978-0-19-967733-7.
- Dou, Shuo-zeng (2014). "Eels in China: Species, Fisheries, Stock Management and Culture". In Tsukamoto, Katsumi; Kuroki, Mari (eds.). Eels and Humans. Humanity and the Sea. Tokyo: Springer. ISBN 978-4-431-54528-6.
- Ehrman, Edwina (1999). London Eats Out: 500 Years of Capital Dining. London & Wappingers' Falls, New York: Philip Wilson Publishers. ISBN 0-85667-516-4.
- Giles, Amber; Fanning, Lucia; Denny, Shelley; Paul, Tyson (April 2016). "Improving the American Eel Fishery Through the Incorporation of Indigenous Knowledge into Police Level Decision Making in Canada". Human Ecology. 44 (2). doi:10.1007/s10745-016-9814-0.
- Glasse, Hannah (1995) [1747]. First Catch Your Hare. Totnes, Devon: Prospect Books. ISBN 1903018374.
- Grigson, Jane (1973). The International Wine and Food Society's Guide to Fish Cookery. London: International Wine and Food Society. ISBN 07153-61007.
- Grigson, Jane (1983). Jane Grigson's Book of European Cookery. New York: Atheneum. ISBN 0-689-11398-6.
- Grigson, Jane (1994) [1973]. Jane Grigson's Fish Book. London: Penguin Books. ISBN 0-14-046929-X.
- Heinzelmann, Ursula (2025). Food Cultures of Germany. New York, London & Dublin: Bloomsbury Academic. ISBN 979-8-7651-2252-5.
- Korn, Oliver (2010) [1998]. "Aalsuppe". In Kopitzsch, Franklin; Tilgner, Daniel (eds.). Hamburg Lexikon (in German) (4th ed.). Hamburg: Zeiseverlag. ISBN 978-3-8319-0373-3.
- Kuroki, Mari; van Oijen, Martien J P; Tsukamoto, Katsumi (2014). "Eels and the Japanese: An Inseparable, Long-Standing Relationship". In Tsukamoto, Katsumi; Kuroki, Mari (eds.). Eels and Humans. Humanity and the Sea. Tokyo: Springer. ISBN 978-4-431-54528-6.
- Molokhovets, Elena (1992) [1861]. Classic Russian Cooking: Elena Molokhovets' a Gift to Young Housewives. Translated by Toomre, Joyce. Bloomington, Indiana: Indiana University Press. ISBN 0253360269.
- Newman, Jacqueline (2004). Food Culture in China. Westport, Connecticut: ABC-CLIO. ISBN 0-313-08572-2.
- Presilla, Maricel E. (2012). Gran Cocina Latina: The Food of Latin America. New York & London: W. W. Norton & Company. ISBN 978-0-393-05069-1.
- Roden, Claudia (2002) [1989]. The Food of Italy: Region by Region. London: Chatto & Windus. ISBN 0-7011-7361-0.
- Schweid, Richard (Spring 2002). "Consider the Eel". Gastronomica. 2 (2). doi:10.1525/gfc.2002.2.2.14.
- Schweid, Richard (2009). Eel. London: Reaktion Books. ISBN 978-1-86189-423-6.
- Stavely, Keith; Fitzgerald, Kathleen (2004). America's Founding Food: The Story of New England Cooking. Chapel Hill, North Carolina & London: The University of North Carolina Press. ISBN 0-8078-2894-7.
- The Good Wife's Guide: Le Ménagies de Paris, A Medieval Household Book. Translated by Greco, Gina L; Rose, Christine M. Ithaca and London: Cornell University Press. 2009 [1393]. ISBN 978-0-8014-4738-9.
- van Limburg Stirum, Cornelia van der Willigen (1961). The Art of Dutch Cooking. New York: Doubleday & Company, Inc. ISBN 9781258468743.
- Weaver, William Woys (1993). Pennsylvania Dutch Country Cooking. New York, London: Abbeville Press. ISBN 1-55859-568-6.
- White, Eileen (2004) [2003]. Soup: The English Kitchen. Totnes, Devon: Prospect Books (UK). ISBN 1-903018-08-0.
- Wilson, C Anne (1976) [1973]. Food & Drink in Britain: From the Stone Age to Recent Times. Harmondsworth, London: Penguin. ISBN 0-14-055-101-8.
