= Fish soup =

Dish

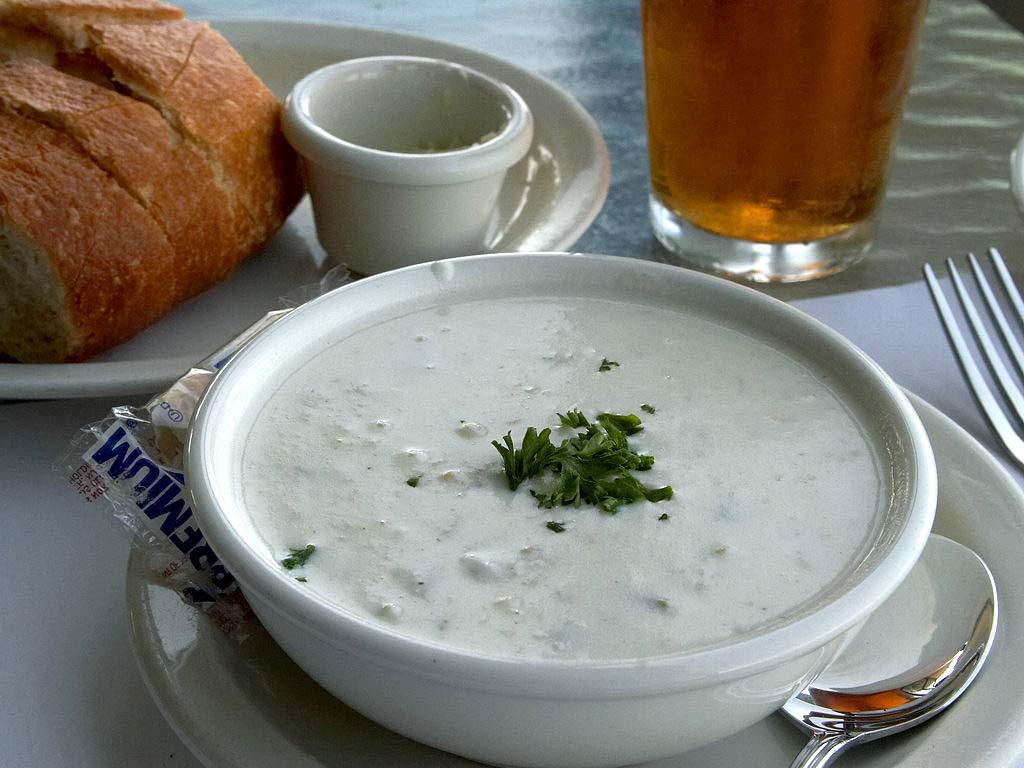
- New England clam chowder made with potatoes and cream
- Type: Soup
- Main ingredients: Fish or seafood, vegetables, liquid (stock, juice, water)

Fish soup is a food made by combining fish or seafood with vegetables and stock, juice, water, or another liquid. Hot soups are additionally characterized by boiling solid ingredients in liquids in a pot until the flavors are extracted, forming a broth.

Traditionally, soups are classified into two main groups: clear soups and thick soups. The established French classifications of clear soups are bouillon and consommé. Thick soups are classified depending upon the type of thickening agent used: bisques are made from puréed shellfish or vegetables thickened with cream; cream soups may be thickened with béchamel sauce; and veloutés are thickened with eggs, butter, and cream. Other ingredients commonly used to thicken soups and broths include rice, lentils, flour, and grains; many popular soups also include carrots and potatoes.

Fish soups are similar to and often indistinct from fish stews, though soup is generally wetter than stew.

Fish soups have been made since early times. Some soups are served with large chunks of fish or vegetables left in the liquid, while a broth is a flavored liquid usually derived from simmering a food or vegetable for a period of time in a stock. Bisques are heavy cream soups traditionally prepared with shellfish, but can be made with any type of seafood or puree of vegetables or fruits. Cream soups are flavored broths thickened with a white sauce. Although they may be consumed on their own, or with a meal, the canned, condensed form of cream soup is sometimes used as a quick sauce in a variety of meat and pasta convenience food dishes, such as casseroles. Similar to a bisque, chowders are thick soups usually containing seafood and potatoes, milk and cream.

== List ==
Name	Image	Type	Description
Aljotta		fish	A Maltese fish soup with plenty of garlic, herbs, and tomatoes, likely to have been an adaptation of the bouillabaisse.
Balık çorbası		fish	A traditional soup from Turkish cuisine.
Bergen fish soup		fish	A heavy, creamed soup made with white fish (haddock, halibut, cod) and various vegetables. Norwegian origin.
Bourride		fish	French fish stew or soup based on white fish (monkfish) with cream and lemon, accompanied with aioli
Bouillabaisse		fish and shellfish	French fish stew or soup based on rock fish but containing neither cream nor lemon, accompanied with rouille
Cantonese seafood soup		fish	Generally a thick seafood soup with a very smooth texture, usually whitish in color and a little transparent.
Carp soup		fish	A soup made with carp's head and offal, onion and vegetable. Part of traditional Czech Christmas Eve dinner.
Cioppino		fish	(Italian-American) fish stew with tomatoes and a variety of fish and shellfish
Cullen skink		fish	A traditional fish soup from Scotland. Made with smoked haddock, potatoes, onions and cream.
Pulmay (Curanto en olla)		seafood soup	Chilean seafood soup made with molluscs, like the Mytilus chilensis (a giant mussel), clam), surf clam, piure accompanied with yellow potatoes, sausages, chicken, and smoked ribs. Generally cooked in white wine and eaten with a side of pebre and fry bread or chapalele
Dashi		chilled	Japanese fish stock soup, with seasonal vegetables.
Eel soup			Soups made from eels are eaten in various cuisines.
Fanesca		fish	A traditional cod soup from Ecuador
Fisherman's soup		fish	Hungarian Halászlé Ηot and spicy river fish soup with a lot of hot paprika. Called riblji paprikaš or fiš-paprikas in Croatian
Fufu and Egusi soup		chunky	A traditional soup from Nigeria made with vegetables, meat, fish, and balls of ground melon seed
Herring soup		fish	A thick soup made with barley meal and smoked herring
Ikan kuah kuning		fish	An Indonesian dish of fish in a yellow soup.
Lohikeitto		fish	A Finnish soup made with salmon, potatoes (other root vegetables can be added such as rutabaga, carrots, onions), cream and dill
Mohinga		fish	A traditional Burmese fish soup made of chickpea flour, crushed toasted rice, garlic, onions, lemongrass, banana tree stem, ginger, fish paste, fish sauce and catfish in a rich broth. Served with rice vermicelli.
Pindang		fish	Indonesian fish soup in salt and sour-tasting spices
Psarosoupa		fish	Greek fish soup, uses a traditional oil-and-lemon sauce, vegetables, rice and sea fish
Sliced fish soup		fish	A dish from Singapore with fish, prawns and vegetables
Sour soup		fish	A Vietnamese dish made with rice, fish, various vegetables, and in some cases pineapple.
Ukha		fish	Russian fish soup, made of various types of fish, vegetables, dill, parsley and black pepper
Waterzooi		fish	A Belgian fish soup
Stock		fish	The basis for many fish soups and sauces. In the West, it is usually made with fish bones and fish heads and finely chopped mirepoix, and cooked for 30–45 minutes. In Japan, fish stock is made from fish that have been fried and boiled for several hours, creating a white milky broth. Concentrated fish stock is called "fish fumet." Dehydrated stock can be formed into small cubes (pictured) called stock cubes.
Lobster bisque		bisque	
Crab bisque		bisque	
Cream of Crab		bisque	
Lobster stew		bisque	Cream-based soup with chunks of lobster
Shrimp bisque		bisque	
New England clam chowder		chowder	Traditionally made with milk or cream, butter, potatoes, salt pork, onion, and clams.
Manhattan clam chowder		chowder	Made with a tomato base
Maryland crab soup		chowder	A soup made of vegetables, blue crab, and Old Bay Seasoning in a tomato base, associated with the state of Maryland in the U.S.A.
She-crab soup		chowder	From Charleston, South Carolina, a creamy soup made with blue crab meat and crab roe.

== See also ==
- Fish stew
- List of fish and seafood soups
- List of soups
