= Etli makarna =

Food dish

- Type: Pasta
- Place of origin: Turkey
- Associated cuisine: Turkish cuisine

Etli makarna is a traditional pasta dish made in Turkey. It is made from meat and pasta. It is prepared in Ottoman cuisine.

== Varieties in Ottoman cuisine ==
In the first Ottoman printed cookbook, Melceü't-Tabbâhîn, there is a recipe for İstofato kum makaronya (meat pasta).
