= Paila marina =

Chilean seafood soup or stew

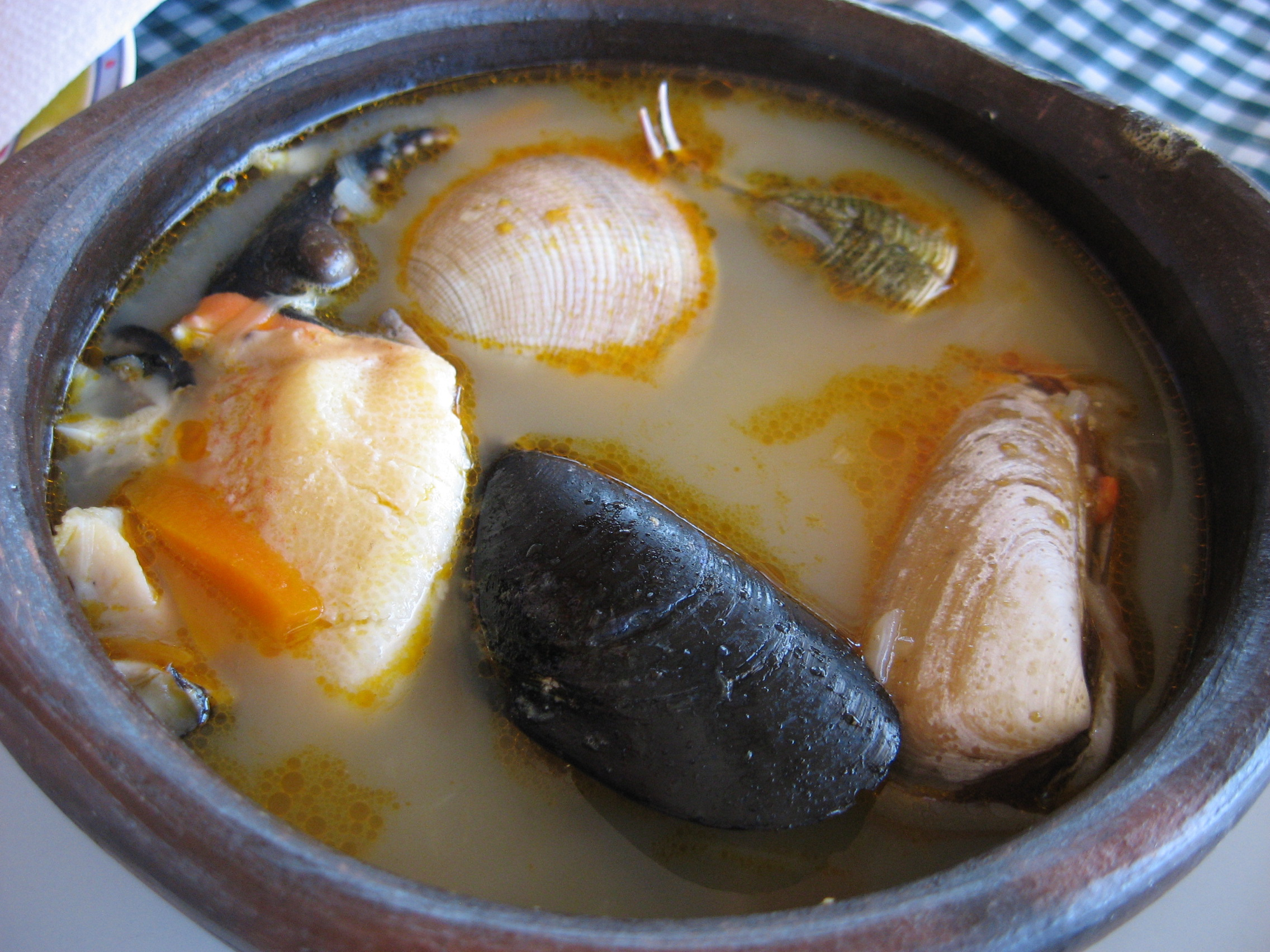
- Type: Stew, soup
- Course: Main
- Place of origin: Chile
- Region or state: Central Chile, Zona Sur, Chile
- Serving temperature: Hot
- Main ingredients: Seafood, shellfish, fish, shellfish stock, herbs, spices

Paila marina is a traditional Chilean seafood soup or light stew usually served in a paila (earthenware bowl). It usually contains a shellfish stock base cooked with different kinds of shellfish and fish. These are complemented with a variety of herbs and spices such as paprika and parsley.

== Preparation ==
Onions, carrots, bell peppers, tomatoes, fish and shellfish (in the shell) are fried together, fish stock is poured over them and the soup is simmered.

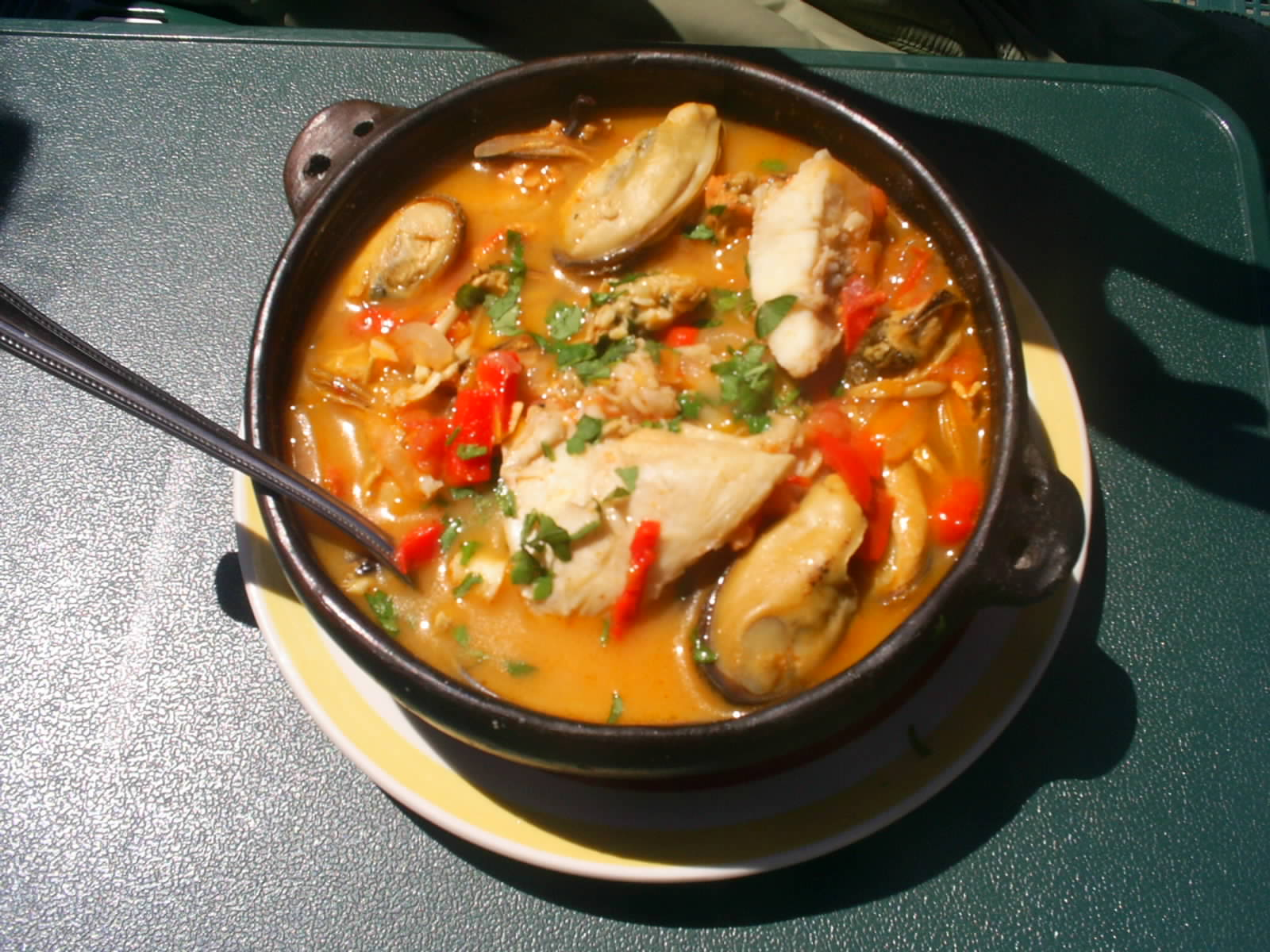
Paila marina is a fish soup common in Chile. A paila is an earthenware bowl.

== Traditions ==
It is traditional for groups of friends or family to go to the local seafood market and enjoy a paila marina, especially the morning after a party, when it is believed to aid recovery from a hangover. On January 1, the historic seafood market Mercado Central de Santiago is one of the busiest places in Santiago; Chilean national newspaper La Nación reported that 28,000 people were expected to visit the market on January 1, 2010. Popular belief also ascribes aphrodisiac properties to paila marina.

== In popular culture ==
- In the episode "Abiquiu" of the US TV series Breaking Bad, the character Gus Fring, a prominent Chilean methamphetamine distributor in the southwest of the United States, prepares a paila marina for Walter White while explaining the origin of this typical Chilean dish. Gus Fring also prepares a paila marina in the episode "Something Stupid" from the Breaking Bad prequel TV series Better Call Saul.

== See also ==
- List of fish and seafood soups
- List of soups
- List of stews
