= A Manual of Turkish Cookery =

Ottoman cookbook

A Manual of Turkish Cookery (Mecmua-i Et'ime-i Osmaniye) (Osmanlı Yemekleri Mecmuası) is a Turkish cookbook that was written in 1864 by Türabi Efendi. It is an English translation of Melceü't-Tabbâhîn.
