= Paila =

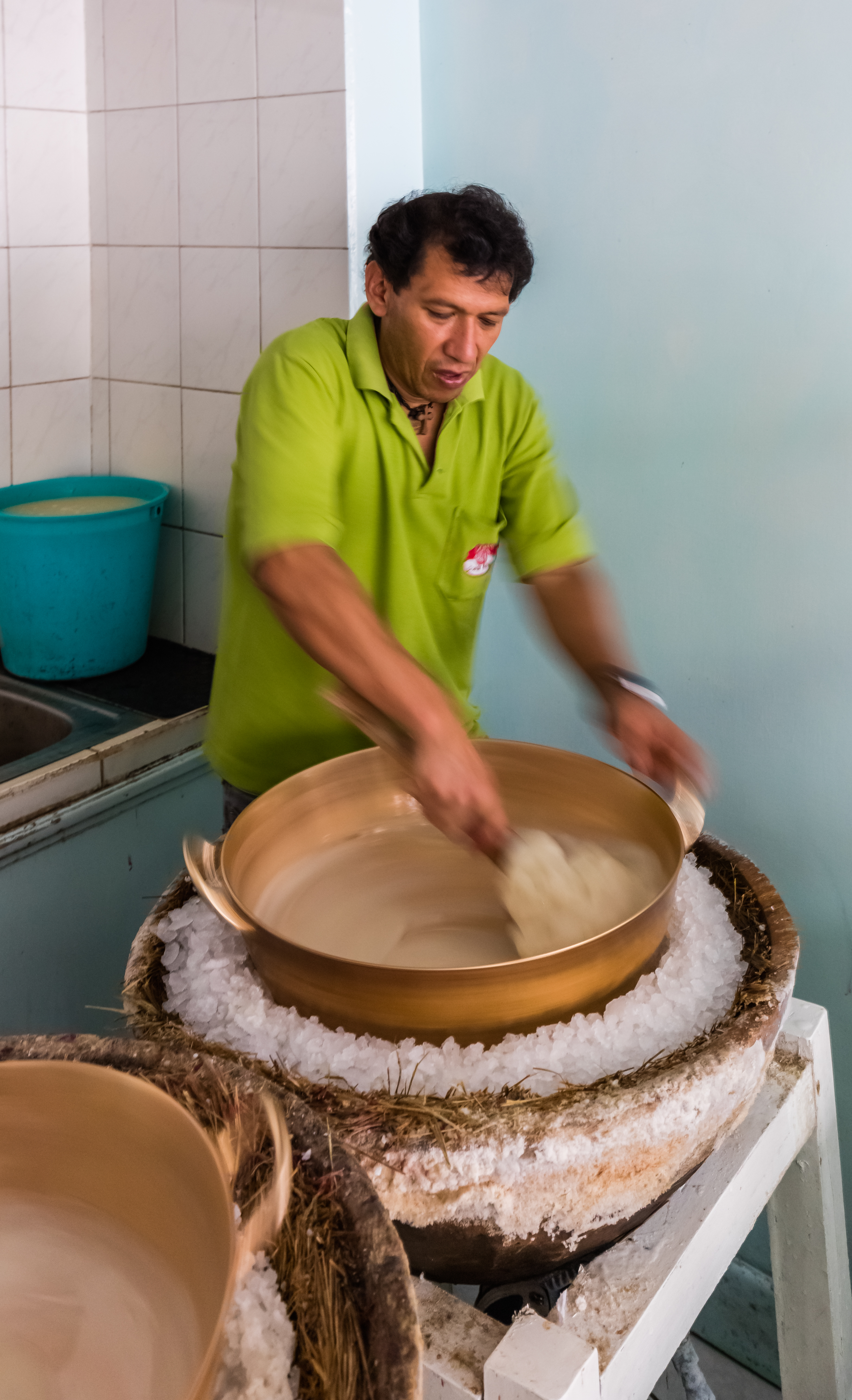
Preparing helado de paila, in Ibarra, Ecuador.

A paila (Spanish pronunciation: [ˈpajla]) is a type of cookware that in several Spanish-speaking South American countries refers to a large shallow metal pan or earthenware bowl which oftentimes is also used as a serving plate for the foods prepared in it. Dishes served in clay pailas are often prepared in the paila itself by way of baking in an oven.

By extension, the word paila is also used for the dishes that are eaten from it, such as paila marina and paila de huevo. An advantage of the clay paila is that clay retains heat well and keeps food warm. Its Valencian equivalent is the paella, which is simply referred to as arroz (rice) by the locals.

== Etymology ==
Paila derives from Old French paele, from Latin patĕlla. It is first attested in Spain in the 16th century, and both is diminutive (pailita) and augmentative (pailón) appeared at the time. Its cognates include modern French poêle and Catalan paella. Nowadays, the use of the term is widespread in Latin America but relatively rare in Spain, where the doublet padilla survives as paílla in Andalusia.

== Regional varieties ==
In addition to being used to prepare the traditional pork fritada, the large shallow and heavy copper paila from Ecuador is also used throughout the country and in the department of Nariño in Colombia as an "ice pail." This is performed by placing the bowl on ice and adding ingredients such as fruit, which is stirred to form a variety of ice creams and sorbets.

In Chile and Peru, clay pans are used to cook cornbread and other specialties such as pan or "pan marina."

In Bolivia, especially in the Cochabamba region, paila is used to cook chicharrón (pork cracklings).

== Gallery ==
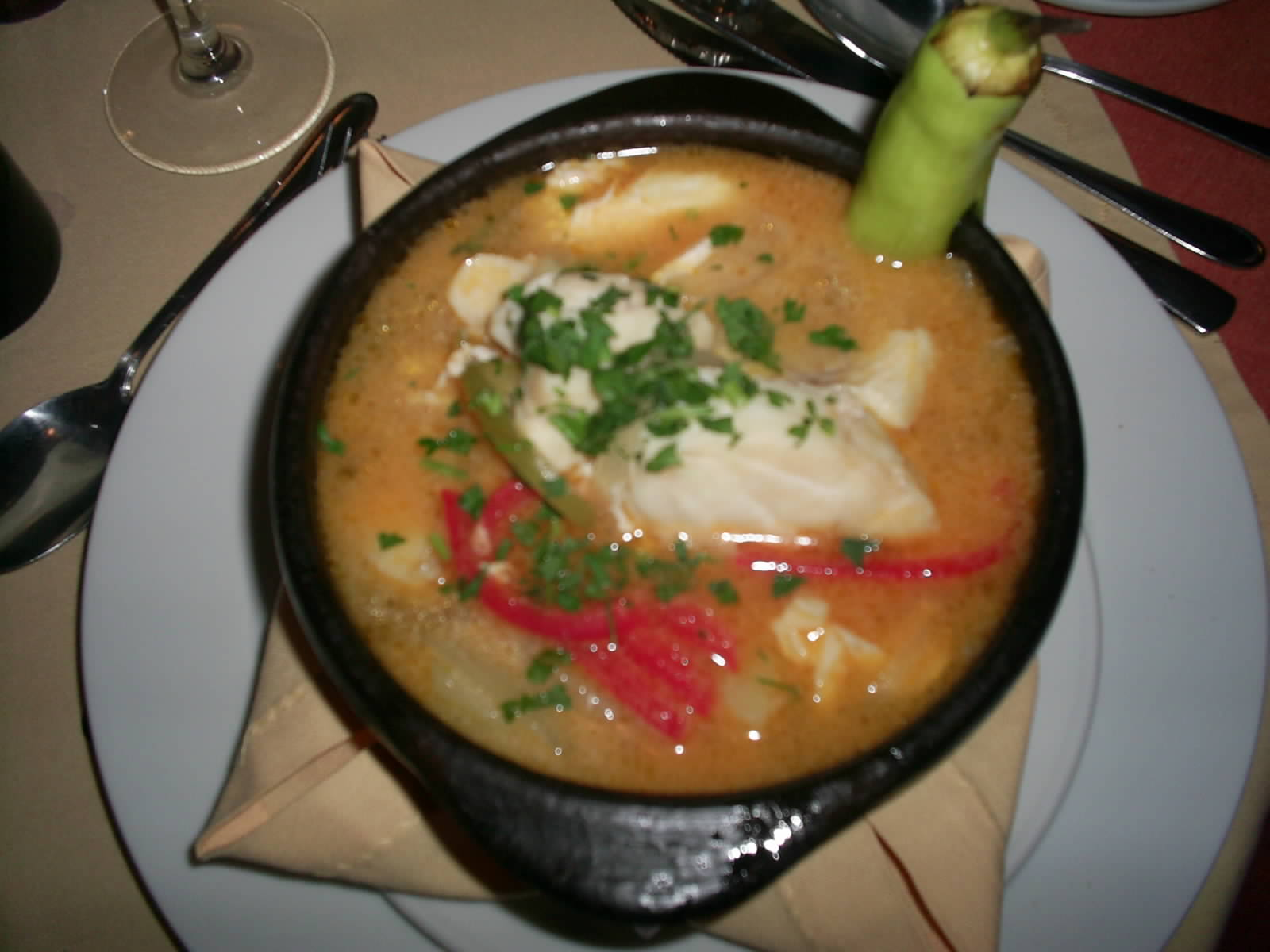
Caldillo de congrio served in a paila

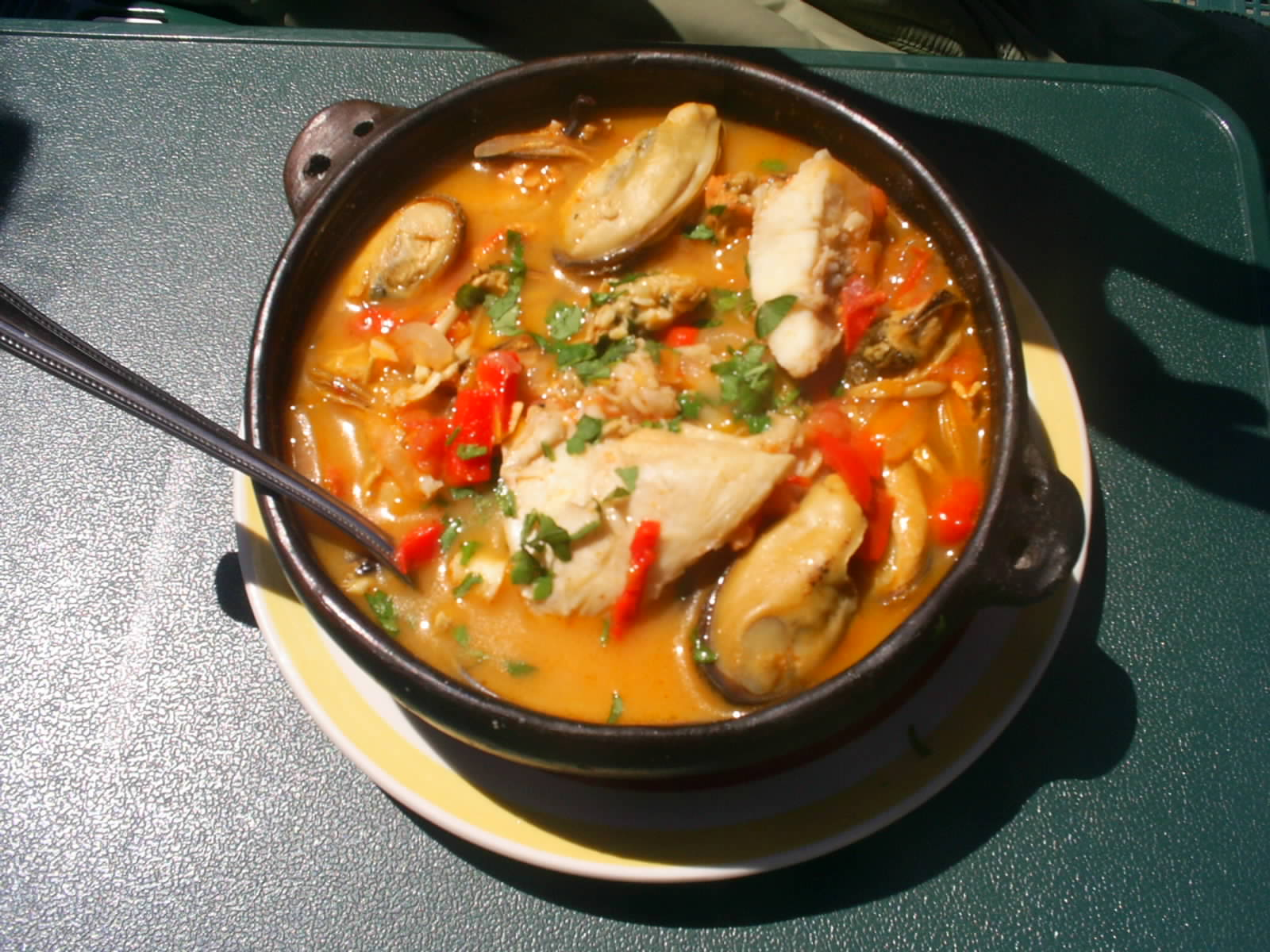
Paila marina is a common seafood soup in Chile and other South American countries.

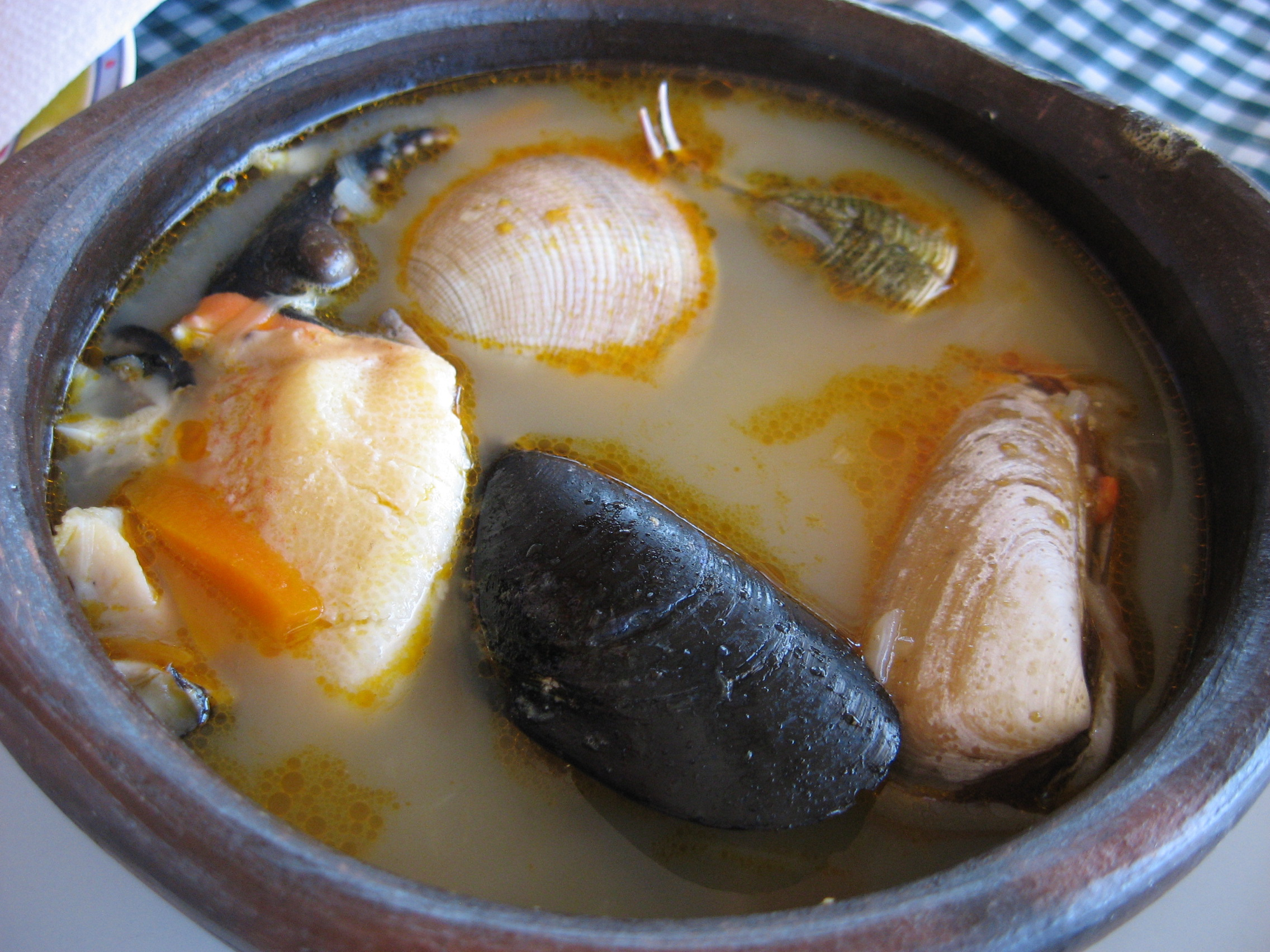
Paila marina
