= Melceü't-Tabbâhîn =

Turkish cookbook

Melceü't-Tabbâhîn (Ottoman Turkish: ملجأ الطباخين, The Sanctuary of Cooks or The Refuge of Cooks), the first Ottoman Turkish cookbook, was written in 1844 by Hoca Mehmed Kâmil, a lecturer at the Imperial School of Medicine in Galatasaray, Istanbul. It was the first-ever printed Turkish-language cookbook.

It was translated into English by Turab Efendi in the 19th century as "A Manual of Turkish Cookery", and translated into Arabic in 1887 by Mohammad Sidqi, the Arabic translation was printed until 1915 in several editions.

The book was used as a reference text for a chapter on foods in the proceedings of the 1889 International Congress of Orientalists.

== Contents ==
The cookbook contains almost 300 recipes divided into 13 chapters, as follows:

- Chapter 1: Soups (çorba) - 6 recipes
  - Includes recipes for balık çorbası (Turkish fish soup) and a soup made from tarhana (desiccated yoghurt)
- Chapter 2: Kebabs and cutlets - 23 recipes
  - Includes recipes for tas kebab, ciğer kebabı (liver kebab), and etli makarna
- Chapter 3: Stews and köfte - 31 recipes
- Chapter 4: Dishes cooked in a tava - 11 recipes
- Chapter 5: Börek and pastry - 21 recipes
- Chapter 6: Hot desserts (baklavas, halvas, kadayif, revani, and others) - 44 recipes
- Chapter 7: Cold desserts - 15 recipes
  - Includes recipes for ashure, sütlaç, and falude
- Chapter 8: Vegetables (also includes some dishes that contain meat) - 26 recipes
- Chapter 9: Zeytinyağlı (special category of vegetable dishes prepared with olive oil) - 14 recipes
- Chapter 10: Pilaf - 13 recipes
- Chapter 11: Hoşaf - 14 recipes
- Chapter 12: Syrups and şerbets - 20 recipes
- Chapter 13: Salads, turşu, tarators and other side dishes - 46 recipes
  - Includes a recipe for cacık (tzatziki), the first written mention of this dish.

== See also ==
- Ali Eşref Dede'nin Yemek Risalesi
- A Manual of Turkish Cookery
