= Buridda =

Seafood soup or stew from Liguria, Italy

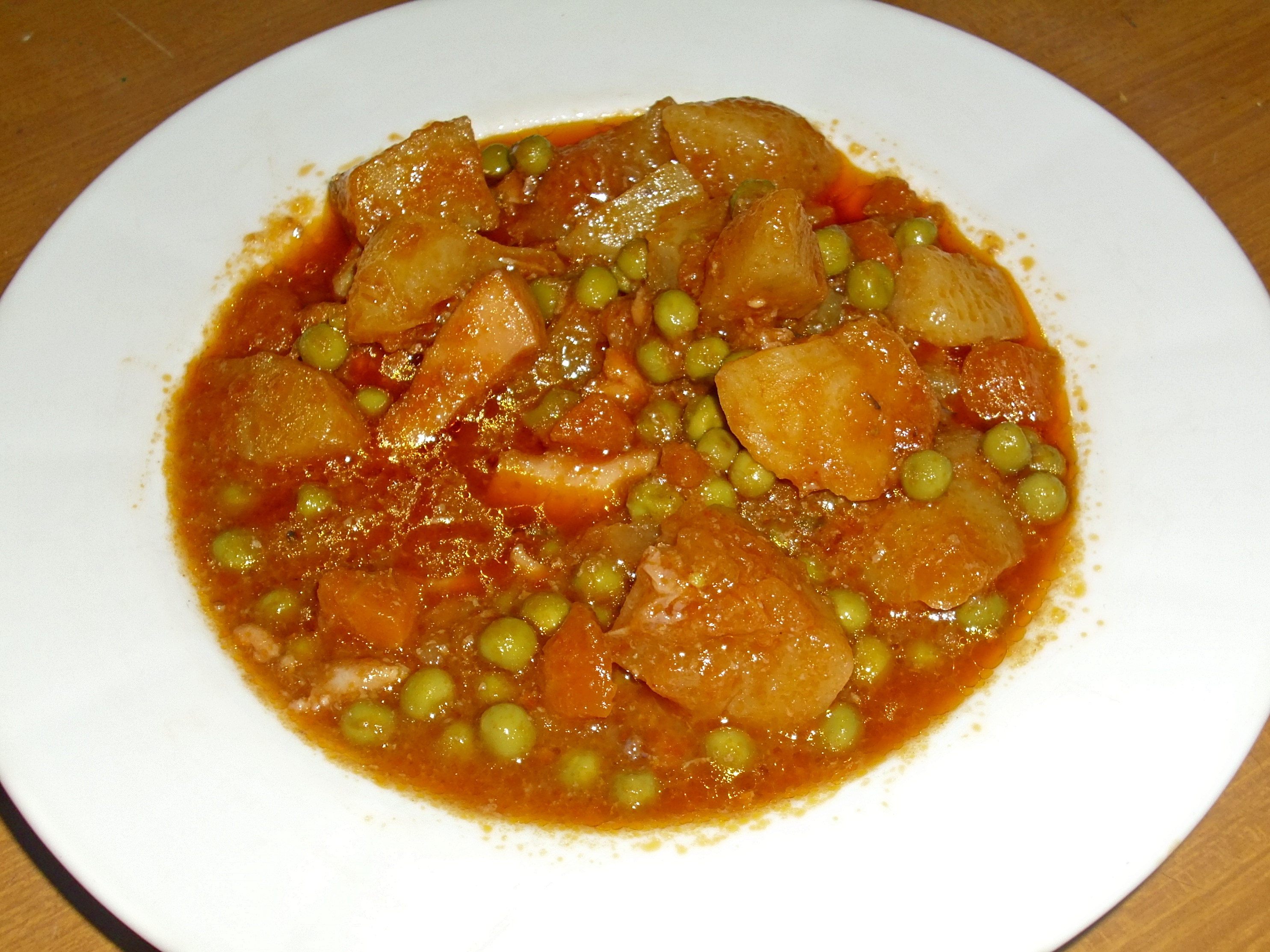
- Buridda of cuttlefish and peas, a typical Ligurian dish
- Type: Fish stew
- Course: Secondo (Italian course)
- Place of origin: Italy
- Region or state: Liguria
- Main ingredients: Fish, broth, tomato, onion, garlic

Buridda is an Italian seafood soup or stew originally from the Liguria region of Italy. Some preparations may be slow-cooked, while others are cooked in a relatively short amount of time (9–10 minutes). It has also been described as a stew, or as similar in texture to a stew.

== Ingredients and preparation ==
Buridda's primary ingredients include seafood, fish broth, tomato, onion and garlic. Traditionally, the soup was served with gallette del marinaio (dry, round bread buns), which would be soaked in it. In contemporary times, toasted bread may be used. It may contain several types of fish, and additional seafoods may include eel, squid, clams or mussels. Simple preparations may be cooked with only dried cod and potato.

== Varieties ==
Buridda alla genovese is a variation that is prepared with the same base ingredients, and may also include shrimp and octopus. It has been described as a "traditional dish from Genoa".

Cioppino is an Italian-American seafood stew invented in the 1800s in San Francisco by people from Genoa, and it is a type of buridda.

Buridda is related to bourride, a fish soup of Provence and the burrida of Sardinia, a dish made of shark meat.

== See also ==
- Cuisine of Liguria
- List of Italian soups
- List of stews
- Fish stew
