= Cotriade =

Fish stew from France

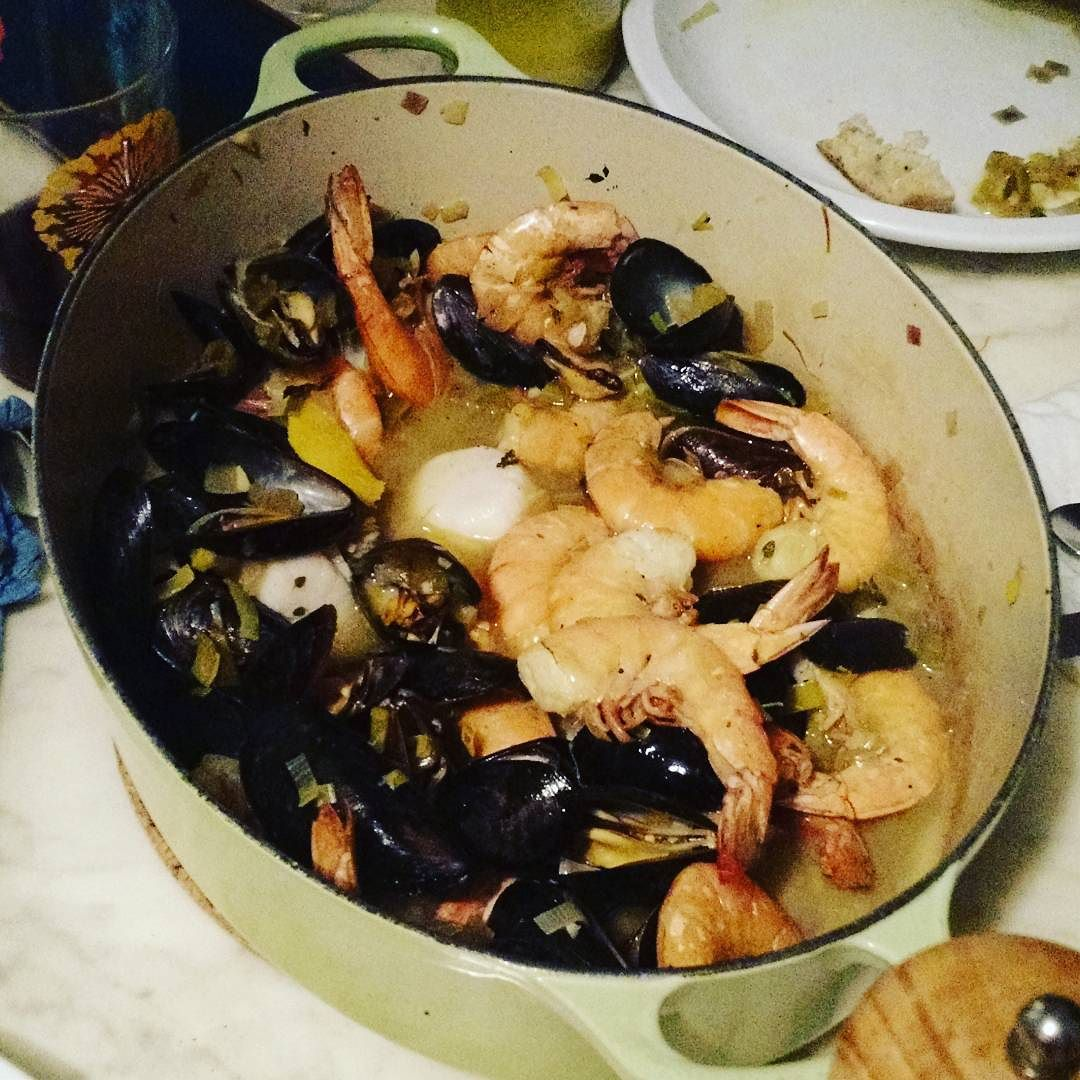
- Type: Fish stew
- Place of origin: France
- Region or state: Brittany
- Main ingredients: Fish, potatoes

Cotriade (Kaoteriad in Breton) is a fish stew specialty from the French region of Brittany that is made with different kinds of fish as well as potatoes, onions, and garlic. Oily fish are typically used, such as herring, sprats, and mackerel. Unlike Bouillabaisse, another French stew, it usually does not contain shellfish. It is traditionally served by pouring it over a toasted baguette. Other breads may also be used.

It is also very prominent in other French regions surrounding Brittany due to its access to the sea.

It is known in the UK as Brittany Fish Stew.

== See also ==
- List of stews
