= Caldo de siete mares =

Mexican seafood soup

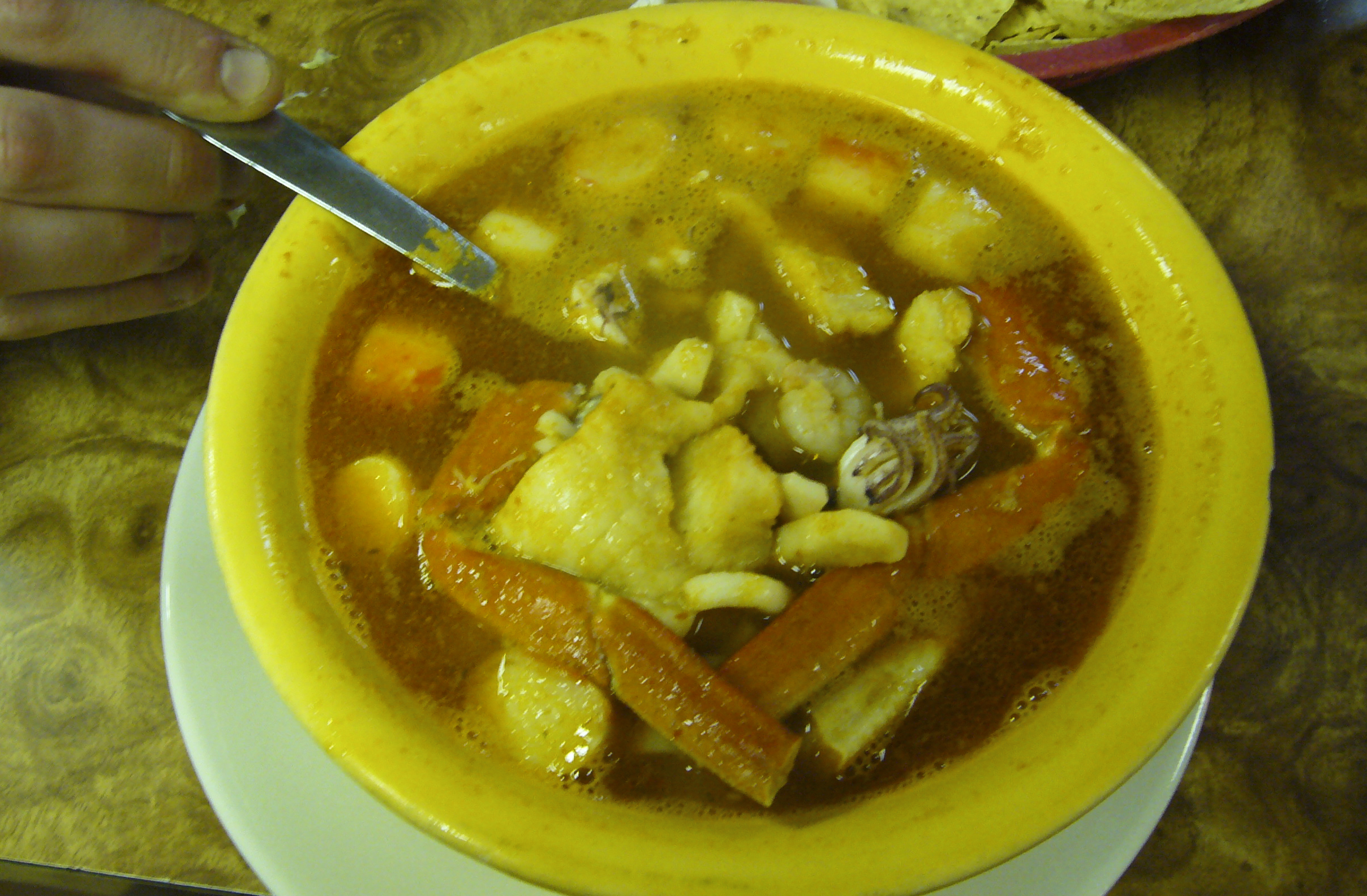
- Caldo de mariscos from a restaurant in Austin, Texas
- Alternative names: Caldo de mariscos
- Type: Soup
- Place of origin: Mexico
- Main ingredients: tomatoes, fish or seafood broth

Caldo de siete mares (in English, "seven seas soup"), also known as caldo de mariscos ("seafood soup") is a Mexican version of fish stew, popular in coastal regions in Mexico. It is typically made with tomato, fish, or seafood broth with local fresh seafood ingredients and, like other Mexican soups, cooked quickly in a thin broth.

== See also ==
- List of Mexican dishes
- List of soups
- List of stews
