= Tarator (sauce) =

Middle Eastern sauce made either from walnuts (Turkey) or tahini (Levant)

Tarator sauce
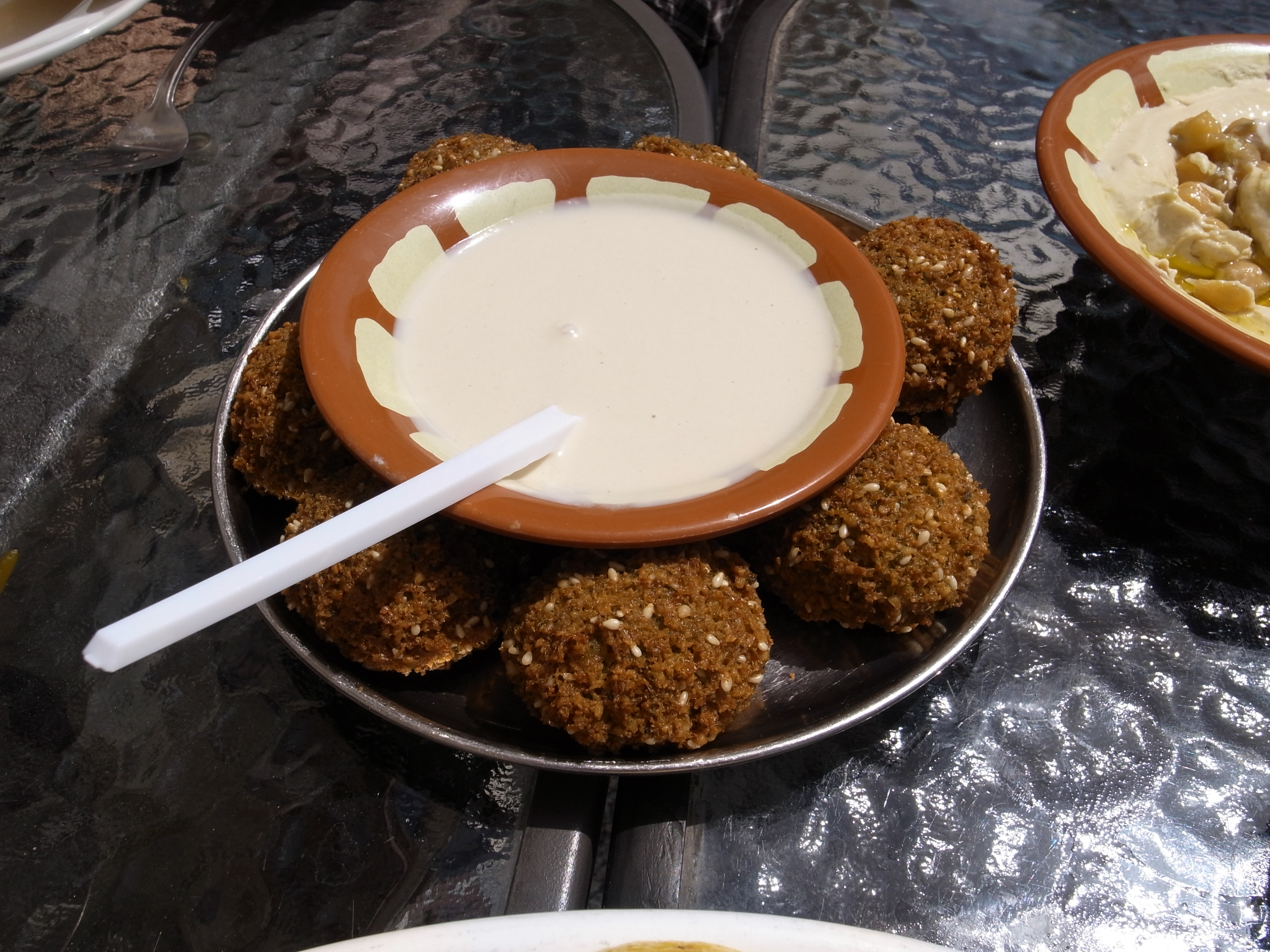
- Levantine tarator with falafels
- Alternative names: tahinia sauce
- Type: Sauce
- Place of origin: Byzantine Empire; Ottoman Empire
- Serving temperature: Cold
- Main ingredients: garlic, lemon juice, ground nuts or sesame
- Variations: Turkish, Levantine

Tarator (Arabic: طراطور), sometimes called tahinia sauce, is a nut- or tahini- based sauce made with lemon juice and garlic that is found in Middle Eastern cuisine and usually served next to fish, falafel, or beef shawarma. It is different from tarator in Balkan cuisine, which is a yoghurt-based cucumber soup similar to tzatziki.

== Name ==
According to the Etymological Dictionary of Contemporary Turkish by Sevan Nişanyan, the word tarator comes from the Venetian word trattòr, itself from the Italian word trattore meaning "restaurant owner", ultimately from Latin tractare.

The earliest mention of the word tarator was by Ottoman explorer Evliya Çelebi in 1655, in his book Seyahatnâme. Evliya describes tarator as a sauce made from garlic and vinegar.

== History ==
Vinegar and nut based sauces have existed in the middle east since medieval times; the 13th century Arabic cookbook kitab al-tabikh by author Muhammad bin Hasan al-Baghdadi mentions a condiment called khall wa-khardal (خل وخردل), made from pounded, peeled, almonds and vinegar.

According to food historian Murat Doğan, tarator was a product originating in Byzantine cuisine, which was adopted later by the Ottoman Turks.

The Ottoman cookbook Melceü't-Tabbâhîn, written in 1844 by Mehmed Kâmil at the Imperial School of Medicine, contained various tarator recipes, using ingredients like walnuts garlic, bread, and spices. Dairy-free olive oil and nut sauces like tarator were popular among Ottoman Christians during fasts.

The word "tarator" (Ottoman Turkish: تراتور, طراتور) appears twice in the 1890 dictionary by Turkish-to-English James Redhouse, A Turkish and English Lexicon, in which it is defined as "A sauce of pounded nuts and oil, eaten with bread". Another description can be found in a 1923 Egyptian Arabic-English dictionary where terator is defines as "condiment of nuts, with garlic, oil, and curdled milk, used with fish."

== By region ==
=== Levant ===
In Levantine cuisine, tarator (Arabic: طراطور) is a sauce made from tahini, lemon juice, ground garlic, salt, and water. It is often served with falafels or fish dishes.

Parsley is a common addition to tahini sauce, this variation is sometimes called baqdunsieh. Yogurt is also a common ingredient. Nuts like almonds or pine nuts are sometimes added to thicken the sauce, similar to the Turkish variety.

In Lebanon, tarator is traditionally served with cooked snails, in a dish called bzeh ma' tarator (Levantine Arabic: بزاق مع طراطور).

In Palestine, tahini sauce is used in a kofta-and-potatoes casserole.

=== Turkey ===
In Turkish cuisine, tarator is a dip made from walnuts, bread, lemon juice or vinegar, ground garlic, and olive oil. It is often served with fried calamari, for that reason it is sometimes called kalamari sos. The sauce is also served with boiled vegetables. There are also recipes of tarator sauce in Turkey that include yoghurt, or mayo.

Turkish tarator may also use other nuts as bases, like almonds. Regional variants of the sauce, such as that of Jehan in southern Turkey, may use tahini as thickener.

Havuç Tarator, or carrot tarator is a Turkish dip made from grated and sauteed carrots, mayonnaise, yogurt, and garlic, and sometimes walnuts.. Some recipes that call for "cevizli tarator" (translates to walnut tarator) are very similar to Muhammara.

== Gallery ==
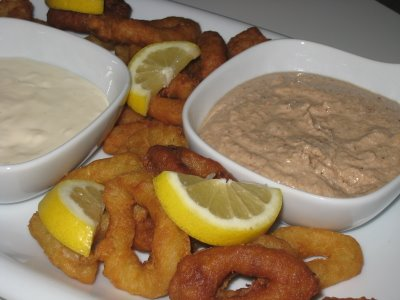
Turkish tarator with fried calamari (kalamar tava ve tarator sos). A staple dish of Byzantine cuisine, which was adopted later by Turkish cuisine.

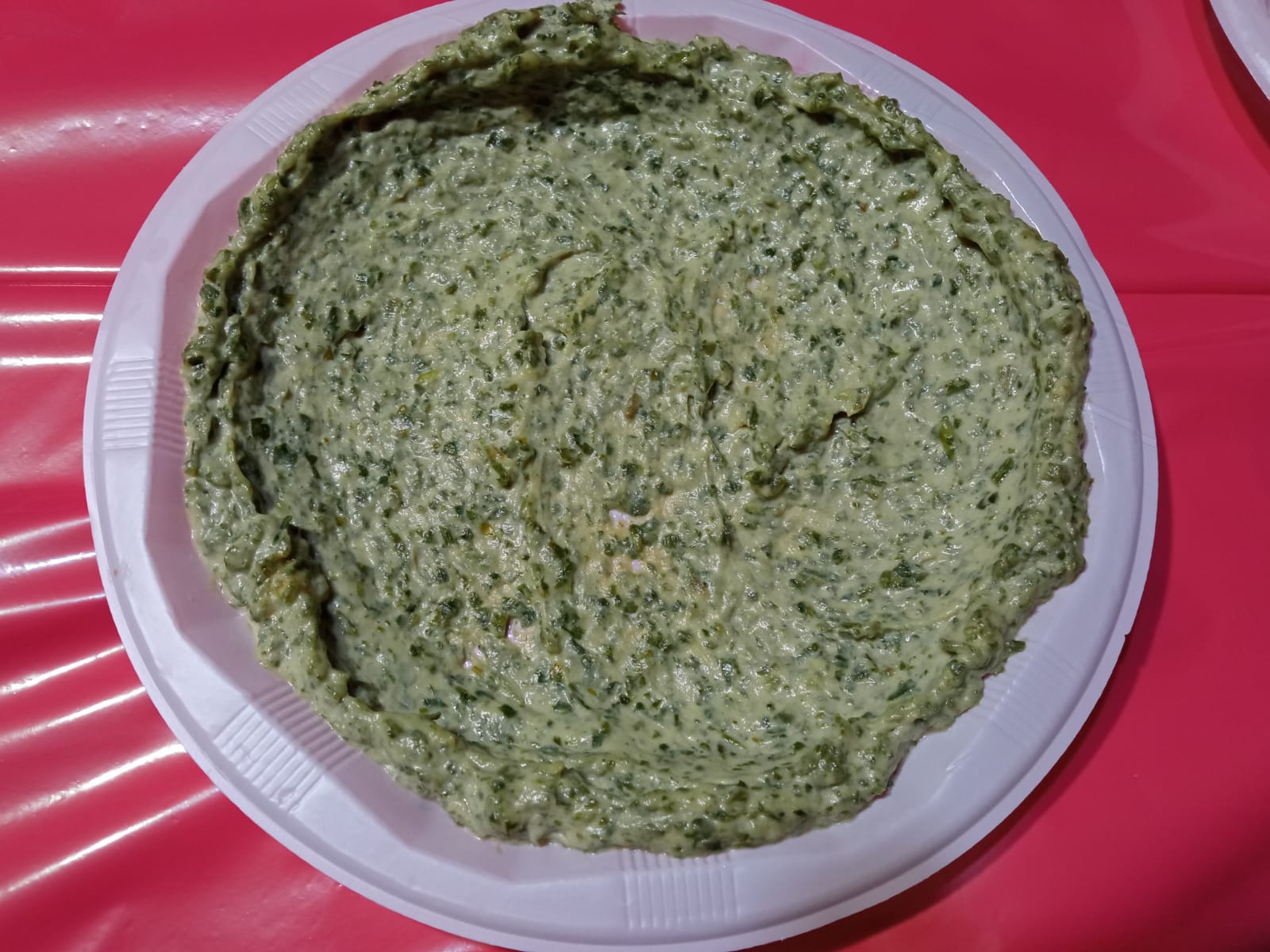
Levantine Baqdunsieh, made with lemon juice, tahini, and parsley

== See also ==
- Muhammara, a Syrian walnut and tahini dip
- Pesto, an Italian condiment made from ground nuts
- Tzatziki, a Balkan soup sometimes made with ground walnuts
- List of condiments
