= Ali Eşref Dede'nin Yemek Risalesi =

Turkish cookbook

Ali Eşref Dede'nin Yemek Risalesi (Ali Eşref Dede's Food Treatise), the second Turkish cookbook was written in 1856 - 57 by Ali Eşref Dede. This book is one of the works written about the dishes of Ottoman period.

== See also ==
- Melceü't-Tabbâhîn
