= Lung fung soup =

Soup made with snake, chicken, and vegetables

- Alternative names: Dragon phoenix soup
- Type: Soup
- Place of origin: China
- Main ingredients: Seafood or mushrooms, lemon, chili peppers, Chinese vegetables

Lung fung soup (龍鳳湯; pinyin: lóng fèng tāng), also referred to as Dragon's soup and Dragon phoenix soup, is a thick seafood or gou rou soup made with lemon, chili peppers, chicken, snake, and Chinese vegetables. Other variations could include a vegetarian version of the same with mushrooms instead of seafood. Fung comes from the use of chicken in the soup while "Lung" comes from the use of snake.

"Feng" means Phoenix in Chinese. "Lung" or "Long" means dragon.

== See also ==
- List of Chinese soups
- List of seafood soups
- List of soups
