= Balık çorbası =

Fish soup, Turkish style

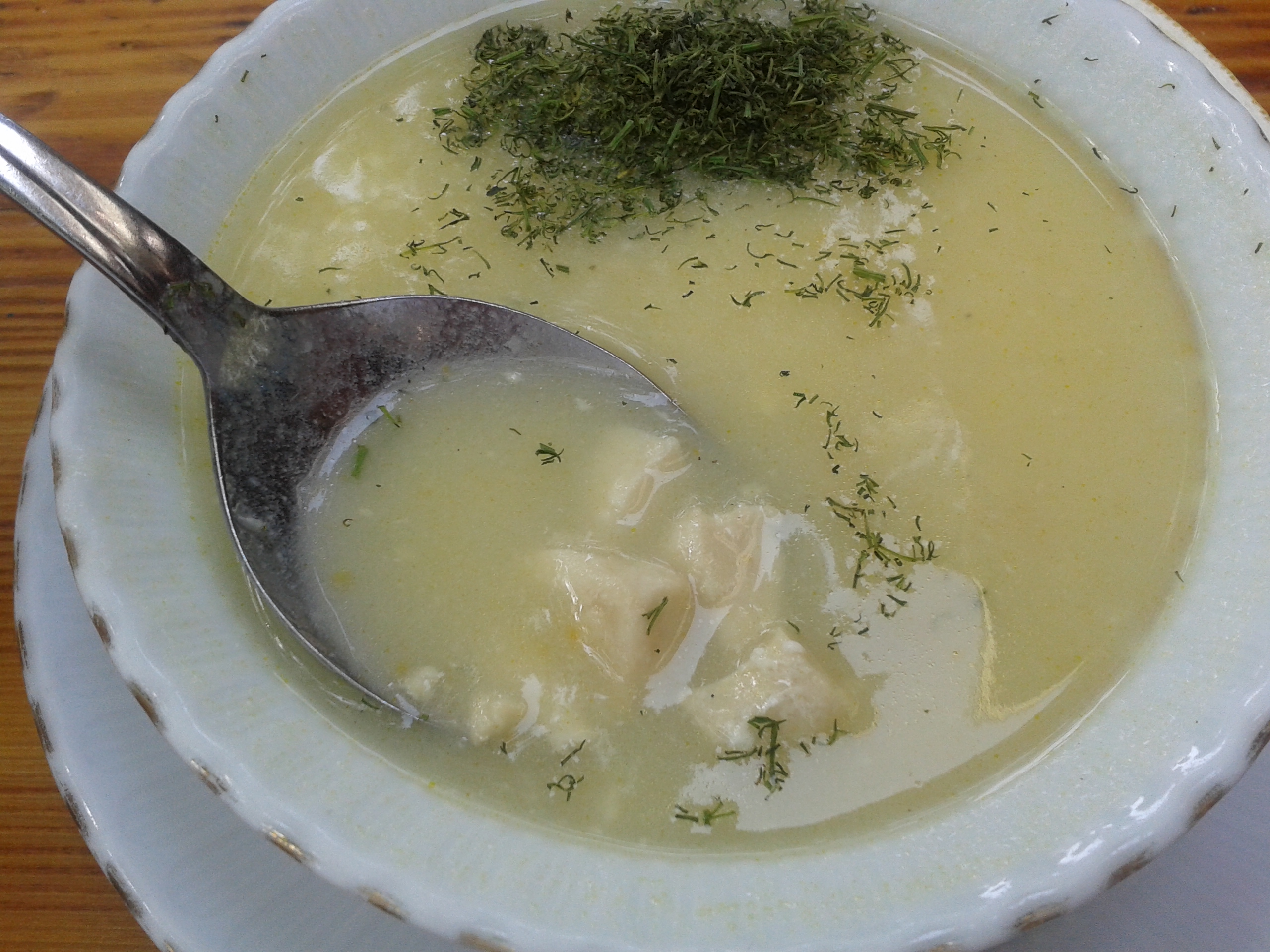
- Course: Main course
- Region or state: Turkey
- Created by: Ottoman cuisine
- Serving temperature: Hot
- Main ingredients: Fish

Balık çorbası (Turkish: Balık çorbası) is the Turkish word for a fish soup or çorba, traditional to Ottoman cuisine. It is included in an 1859 cookbook, the first printed Ottoman cookbook.

== Varieties in Ottoman Cuisine ==
In the first Ottoman printed cookbook, Melceü't-Tabbâhîn, there is a recipe as balık çorbası.

== See also ==
- List of fish dishes
- List of soups
