= Fish soup bee hoon =

Singaporean and Indonesian soup dish

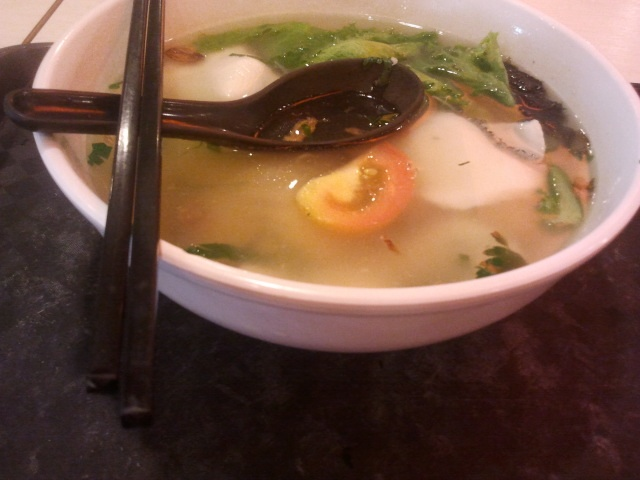
- Fish soup bee hoon at Food Junction in Singapore
- Alternative names: Fish head bee hoon
- Course: Soup
- Place of origin: Singapore
- Region or state: Maritime Southeast Asia
- Serving temperature: Hot
- Main ingredients: Fish (usually snakehead, also pomfret or batang), fish stock or bones, bee hoon, water, oil, yams, milk

Fish soup bee hoon, also known as fish head bee hoon, is a Singaporean soup-based seafood dish served hot usually with bee hoon. The dish is viewed as a healthy food by Singaporeans. Catherine Ling of CNN listed fish soup bee hoon as one of the "40 Singapore foods we can't live without".

== History ==
Fish soup bee hoon has been available since at least the 1920s; one source credits Swee Kee Fish Head Noodle House with creating the "definitive version" of the dish in the 1970s.

== Ingredients ==
Snakeheads are most commonly used for fish soup bee hoon. Other stalls may offer pomfret, batang, or garoupa. While fish heads or the whole fish may be used, some diners prefer having just fish slices. The fish soup is made out of either fish stock or actual bones, water, oil, yam, and milk, (Note: Some fish soup bee hoon stalls, such as China Square Fried Fish Soup, do not add milk to their fish soup.) with vegetables and select fruits.

The noodle in the soup is often bee hoon, although a healthier alternative except for irritable bowel syndrome sufferers would be spaghetti made from brown rice. Another noodle variant would be fried noodles. Additional ingredients include eggs, anchovies, pepper, salt, and alcoholic products such as brandy, Chinese wine, or cognac, chilli slices, fried shallots, and fish roe. For the vegetarian version of the dish, fish meat is substituted with tofu.

== Preparation ==
The fish is boiled and added to a bowl of fish soup. The fish may also be fried. The soup is boiled for about twenty minutes, though a broth made from fish or pork bones boiled for several hours is sometimes used as a base. The dish is served hot.

== Culture ==
Grace Chen of The Star writes that fish soup bee hoon is "to Singaporeans what the char kway teow is to Penangites". Catherine Ling of CNN describes fish soup bee hoon as one of the "40 Singapore foods we can't live without". Jin Hua Fish Head Bee Hoon was named the best fish soup bee hoon store in Singapore by Time Out Singapore in 2012.

== See also ==
- List of soups

== Bibliography ==
- MobileReference (2007). Travel Singapore: Illustrated Travel Guide, Phrasebook, and Maps. MobileReference. ISBN 9781605010151.
