= Eileen White =

American molecular biologist

- Citizenship: American
- Education: Rensselaer Polytechnic Institute, State University of New York, Stony Brook
- Occupations: Scientist, Researcher
- Years active: 1983-present
- Organization(s): Rutgers Cancer Institute of New Jersey; Rutgers University; Ludwig Institute for Cancer Research
- Known for: oncogenes, cancer research, apoptosis in cancer, metabolism in cancer, autophagy in cancer
- Honours: National Academy of Sciences, American Association for Cancer Research

Eileen White is an American cancer biologist known for her research on the molecular mechanisms of tumor cell survival and cancer metabolism. She currently serves as deputy director, chief scientific officer, and associate director for basic science at the Rutgers Cancer Institute of New Jersey. She is also the distinguished professor of molecular biology and biochemistry at Rutgers University, and the associate director of the Princeton Branch of the Ludwig Institute for Cancer Research. White was elected member of the National Academy of Sciences in 2021.

== Education ==
White received her BS in Biology from Rensselaer Polytechnic Institute in 1977 and a PhD in Biology from SUNY Stony Brook in 1983 in the laboratory of Arnold J. Levine. After receiving her PhD, she served as a Damon Runyon postdoctoral fellow at Cold Spring Harbor Laboratory under Dr. Bruce Stillman from 1983 to 1986. She then worked as a staff investigator at that laboratory until 1990.

== Research and career ==
White has spent her career researching apoptosis, autophagy, and metabolism in cancer.

White began her career in cancer research at Cold Spring Harbor Laboratory, where she was investigating how genes from tumor adenoviruses cause cancer. She discovered that one of the viral oncogenes was a viral homologue of the gene that encodes Bcl-2, a mammalian protein that inhibits apoptosis, programmed cell death.

She then joined Rutgers University as an assistant professor in 1990 and continued her work researching the role of apoptosis in cancer. There she discovered that oncogenes that deregulate cell growth can also activate apoptosis, which allowed her to establish the role of the p53 tumor suppressor in suppressing cancer via activation of apoptosis and that proteins inhibiting apoptosis promote cancer. Later, her lab found that the BH3-only members of the Bcl-2 protein family suppress tumor growth, and are consequently inhibited in cancerous cells leading to the conclusion that resisting cell death is one of the hallmarks of cancer. This work allowed for the development of Bcl-2 inhibitors as a viable cancer therapy. Her laboratory then researched the role of autophagy in cancer, and found that cancer cells promote autophagy, the recycling of intracellular components and damaged proteins, in order to combat metabolic stress. She is currently focused on developing cancer therapies that inhibit autophagy in tumors.

== Awards and honors ==
- MERIT award from the National Cancer Institute
- Fellowship from the Damon Runyon Cancer Research Foundation
- Fellow of the American Society for Microbiology
- Howard Hughes Medical Institute Investigatorship
- Member of the National Academy of Sciences
- Fellow of the American Association for Cancer Research Academy
