= Cioppino =

Italian-American fish stew originating in San Francisco

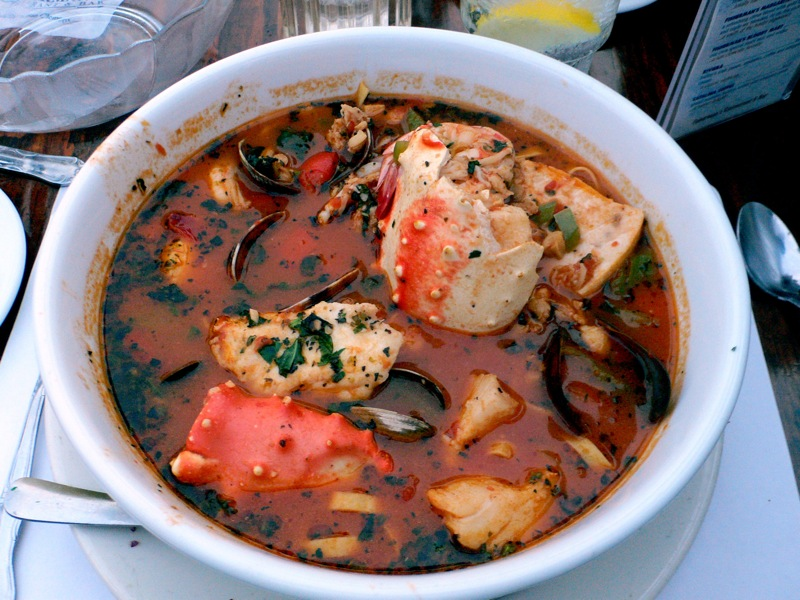
- Type: Fish stew
- Place of origin: United States
- Region or state: California
- Main ingredients: Seafood (Dungeness crab, clams, shrimp, scallops, squid, mussels, fish), tomatoes, wine

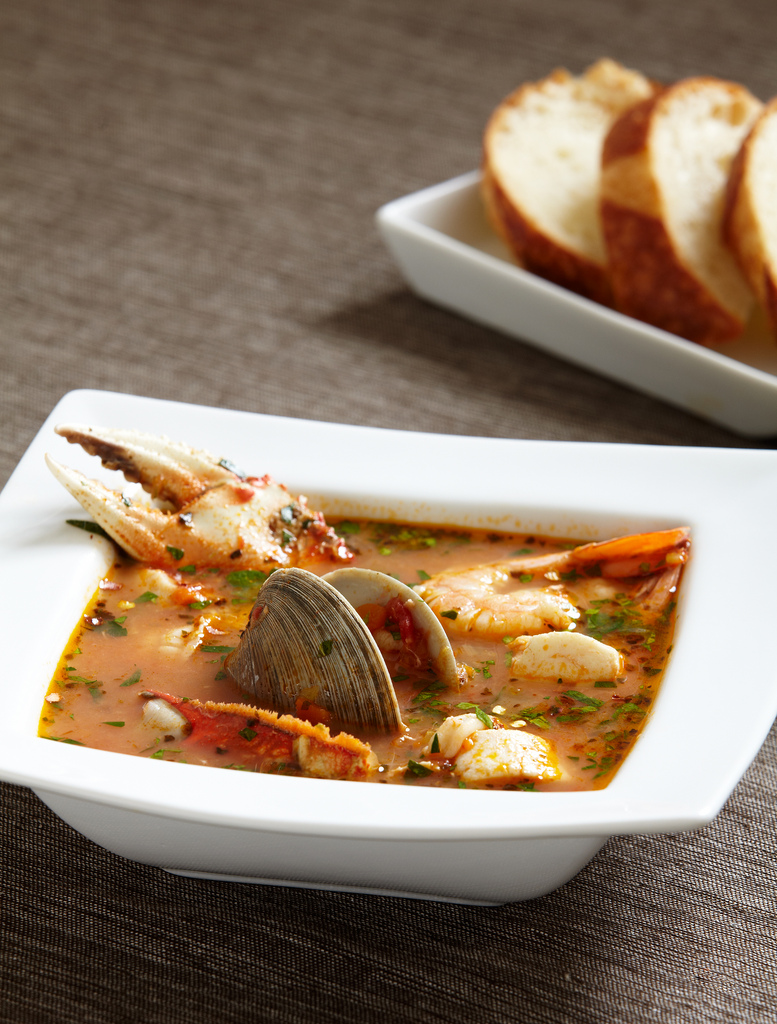
Cioppino with bread

Cioppino (/tʃəˈpiːnoʊ/, Italian: [tʃopˈpiːno]; from Ligurian: cioppin [tʃuˈpiŋ]) is a fish stew originating in San Francisco, California, a dish in Italian-American cuisine related to various fish soups in Italian cuisine.

== Description ==
Cioppino is traditionally made from the catch of the day, which in San Francisco is typically a combination of Dungeness crab, clams, shrimp, scallops, squid, mussels, and fish, all sourced from the Pacific. The seafood is then combined with fresh tomatoes in a wine sauce.

The dish can be served with toasted bread, either local sourdough or French bread. The bread acts as a starch, similar to a pasta, and is dipped into the sauce.

== History ==
Cioppino was developed in the late 1800s by Italian immigrants and Spaniards and some Portuguese who fished off Meiggs Wharf and lived in the North Beach neighborhood of San Francisco, many from the port city of Genoa. When a fisherman came back empty-handed, he would walk around with a pot for the other fishermen to chip in whatever they could. This became his "cioppino". The fishermen that chipped in expected the same treatment if they came back empty-handed in the future. It later became a staple as Italian restaurants proliferated in San Francisco.

The name is also said to derive from ciuppin (also spelled ciupin) which is the name of a classic soup from the Italian region Liguria, similar in flavor to cioppino but with less tomato and using Mediterranean seafood cooked to the point that it falls apart.

The dish also shares its origin with other regional Italian variations of seafood stew similar to cioppino, including cacciucco from Tuscany, brodetto di pesce from Abruzzo and others. Similar dishes can be found in coastal regions throughout the Mediterranean, from Spain to Greece. Examples of these include suquet de peix from Catalan-speaking regions and bouillabaisse from Provence.

The earliest printed description of cioppino is from a 1901 recipe in The San Francisco Call, though the stew is called "chespini". "Cioppino" first appears in 1906 in The Refugee's Cookbook, a fundraising effort to benefit San Franciscans displaced by the 1906 earthquake and fire.

== Presentation ==
Generally the seafood is cooked in broth and served in the shell, including the crab, which is often served halved or quartered. It therefore requires special utensils, typically a crab fork and cracker. Depending on the restaurant, it may be accompanied by a bib to prevent food stains on clothing, a damp napkin and a second bowl for the shells. A variation, commonly called "lazy man's cioppino", is served with shells pre-cracked or removed.

== See also ==
- Cuisine of California
- List of regional dishes of the United States
- List of seafood dishes
- List of soups
- List of stews
- Bouillabaisse
