= Caldillo de congrio =

Chilean fish soup

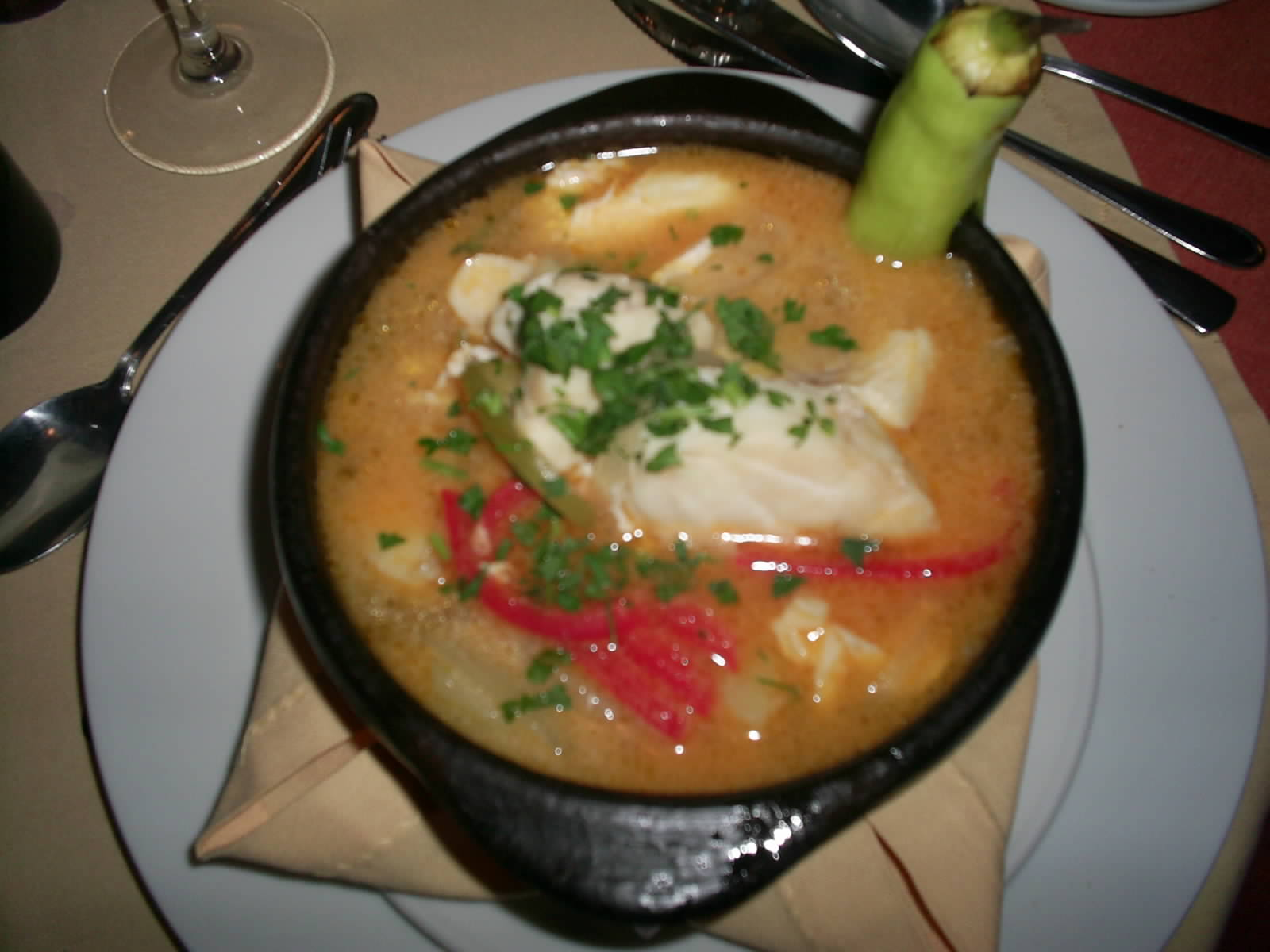
- Caldillo de congrio served in a paila
- Type: Soup
- Place of origin: Chile
- Region or state: Southern Cone
- Main ingredients: Fish heads (congrio colorado), onion, garlic, coriander, carrots, pepper, water, cream, tomatoes, potatoes

Caldillo de congrio (Spanish for cusk-eel stock) is a Chilean fish soup. The dish is made of congrio dorado (pink cusk-eel) or congrio colorado (red cusk-eel), cusk-eel species common in the Chilean Sea. The dish is made by boiling together fish heads, onion, garlic, coriander, carrots, and pepper. Once these are boiled, only the stock is used. Onion and garlic are fried together with chopped tomatoes. The vegetables are mixed then with the stock, cream, boiled potatoes, and marinated and boiled conger.

Chilean literature Nobel laureate Pablo Neruda wrote an ode to caldillo de congrio called Oda al Caldillo de Congrio. The Communist Party of Chile has a tradition of serving the Chilean press and media caldillo de congrio at an annual event at which important announcements are made regarding the current year.

== See also ==
- Eel soup
- List of soups
- List of fish and seafood soups
