= Four Ways =

Four Ways may refer to:

- Four Ways Restaurant, former name of Fraser Mansion, Dupont Circle neighborhood, Washington, D.C.
- Four Ways, Queensland, a locality in the Shire of Cloncurry, Queensland, Australia
- Four Ways (album), a 2017 album by Roscoe Mitchell
- Fourways, an area of Johannesburg, South Africa
