= Fraser Mansion =

Building in Dupont Circle, Washington, D.C.

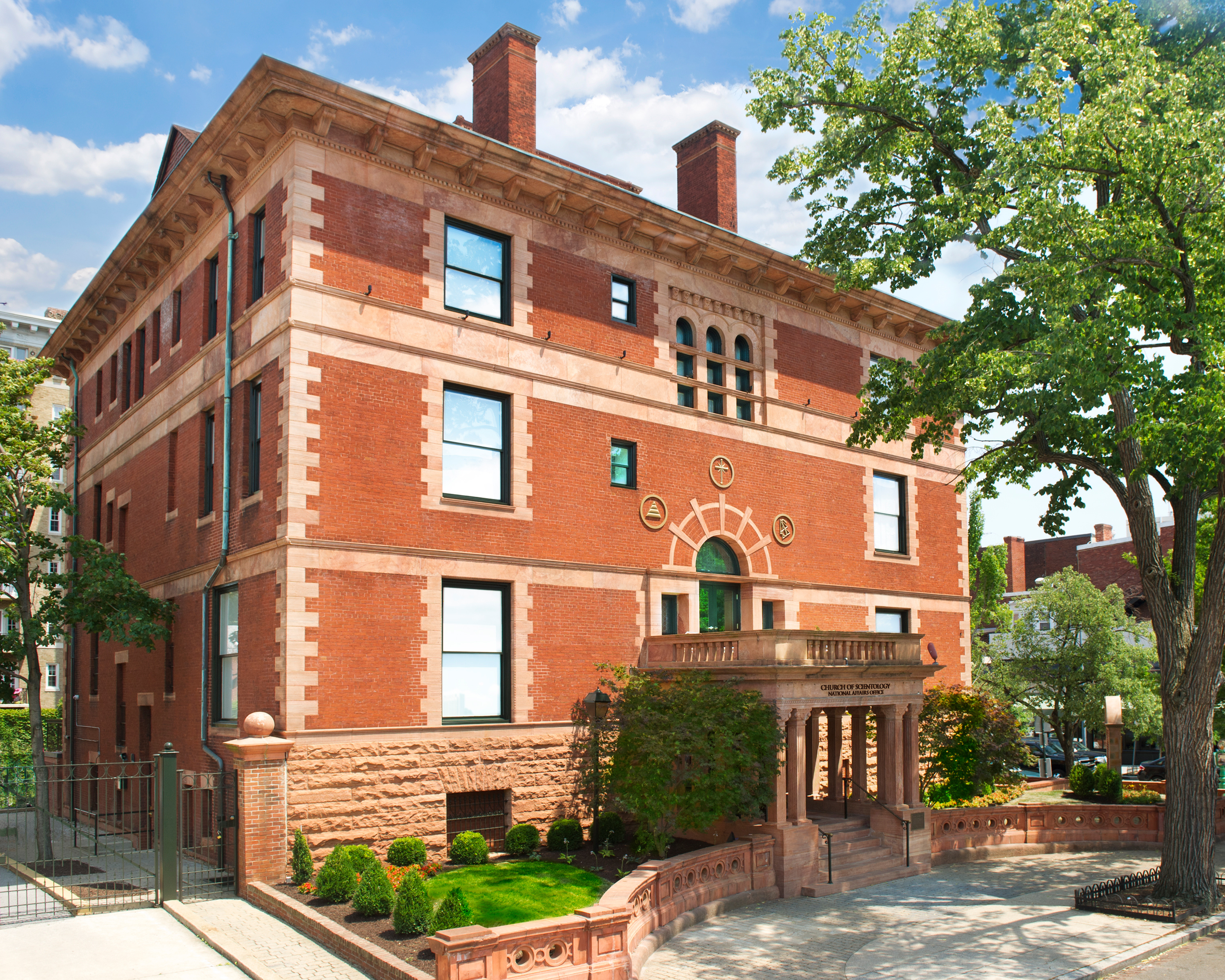
- Fraser Mansion in 2012

- Location within Washington, D.C.
- Former names: Scott-Thropp House, Golden Parrot Restaurant, Golden Booeymonger Restaurant, Four Ways Restaurant

General information
- Architectural style: Beaux arts, Italian Renaissance, Richardsonian Romanesque
- Location: 1701 20th Street NW, Washington, DC, United States
- Coordinates: 38°54′46.2″N 77°2′40.5″W
- Completed: 1890
- Owner: Church of Scientology

Design and construction
- Architecture firm: Hornblower & Marshall

The Fraser Mansion is a building at 1701 20th Street NW, at the intersection of Connecticut Avenue, 20th Street, and R Street in the Dupont Circle neighborhood of Washington, D.C. constructed in 1890 to be the George S. Fraser mansion, it served as his private residence for five years, a restaurant, a boarding house, the home of the new Founding Church of Scientology, and—currently—the location of Scientology's National Affairs office.

The mansion was listed on the National Register of Historic Places in 1975.

== History ==
George S. Fraser was a merchant born in 1830 in New York, he was the son of Alexander Fraser (farmer) and Ann Fraser. He became a successful merchant and in 1880's decided to build a mansion in Washington D.C. as his permanent house.

=== Design and construction ===
The mansion was designed by the architectural firm of Hornblower and Marshall in an early eclectic beaux arts style to serve as the home of George S. Fraser.

The building is three stories tall with two basement levels and an attic. It is constructed of red brick and pink granite with a colonnaded entrance porch with balustraded deck, and a tiled, hipped roof. The interior was planned around a central open stair, with large, central halls on each floor.

=== Fraser family residency ===
The building was completed in 1890 at a cost of $75,000, more than ten times the cost of a typical Washington home at that time. and served as Fraser's residence from 1890 until his death in 1896.

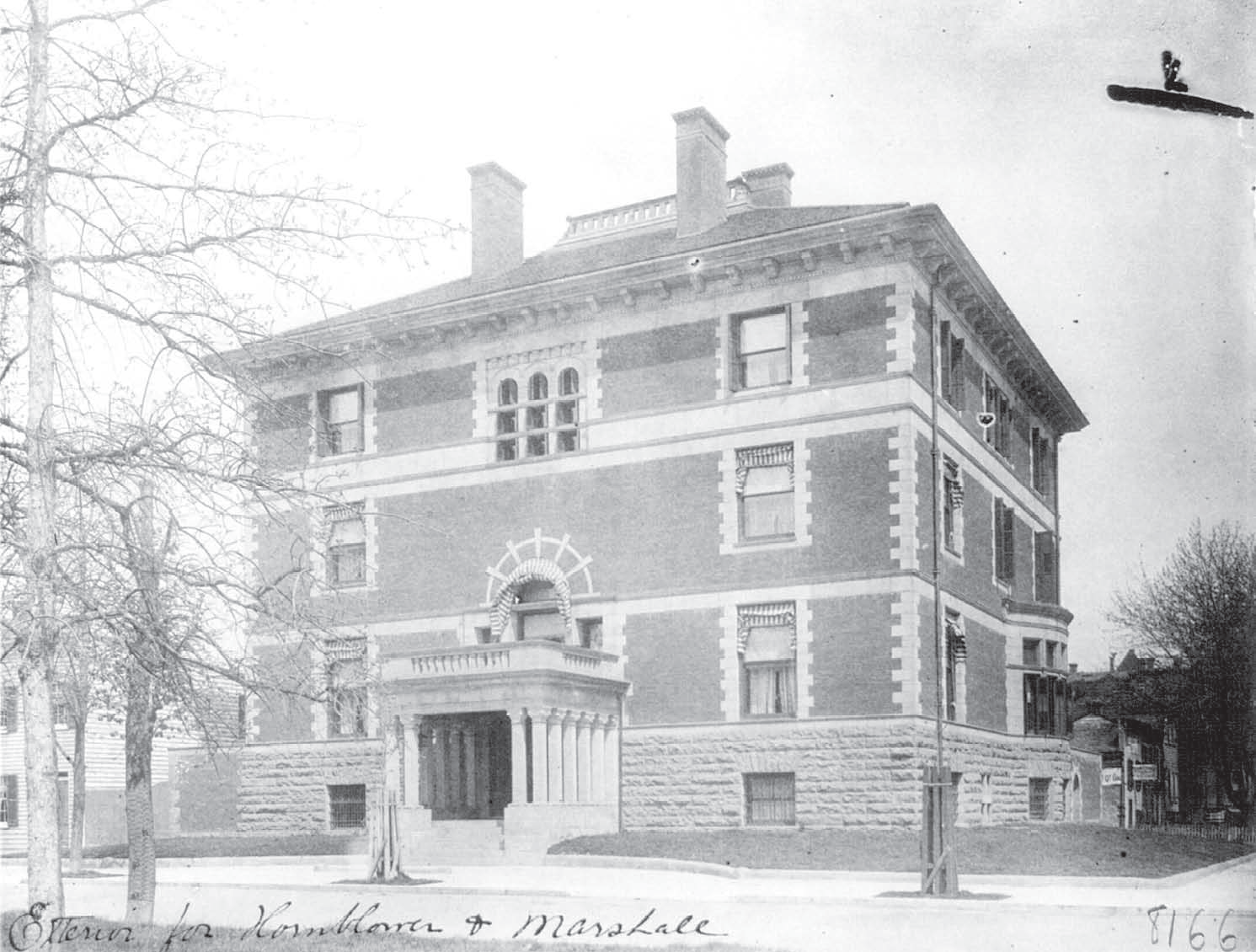
Fraser Mansion prior to 1901 alterations

In 1901, Fraser's widow sold the mansion to Pennsylvania Congressman Joseph Earlston Thropp, where he took up residence beginning on March 3, 1901.

=== Joseph Earlston Thropp ===
The Thropps made exterior alterations, enlarging dormer windows and adding an oriel window in 1901. In 1905, architects Totten and Rogers designed a terrace with an entrance to the house near the oriel window, and also redesigned the garden wall.

The mansion remained in the ownership of Thropp and his wife, Miriam Scott-Thropp, until Scott-Thropp's death in 1930.

=== Restaurant ===
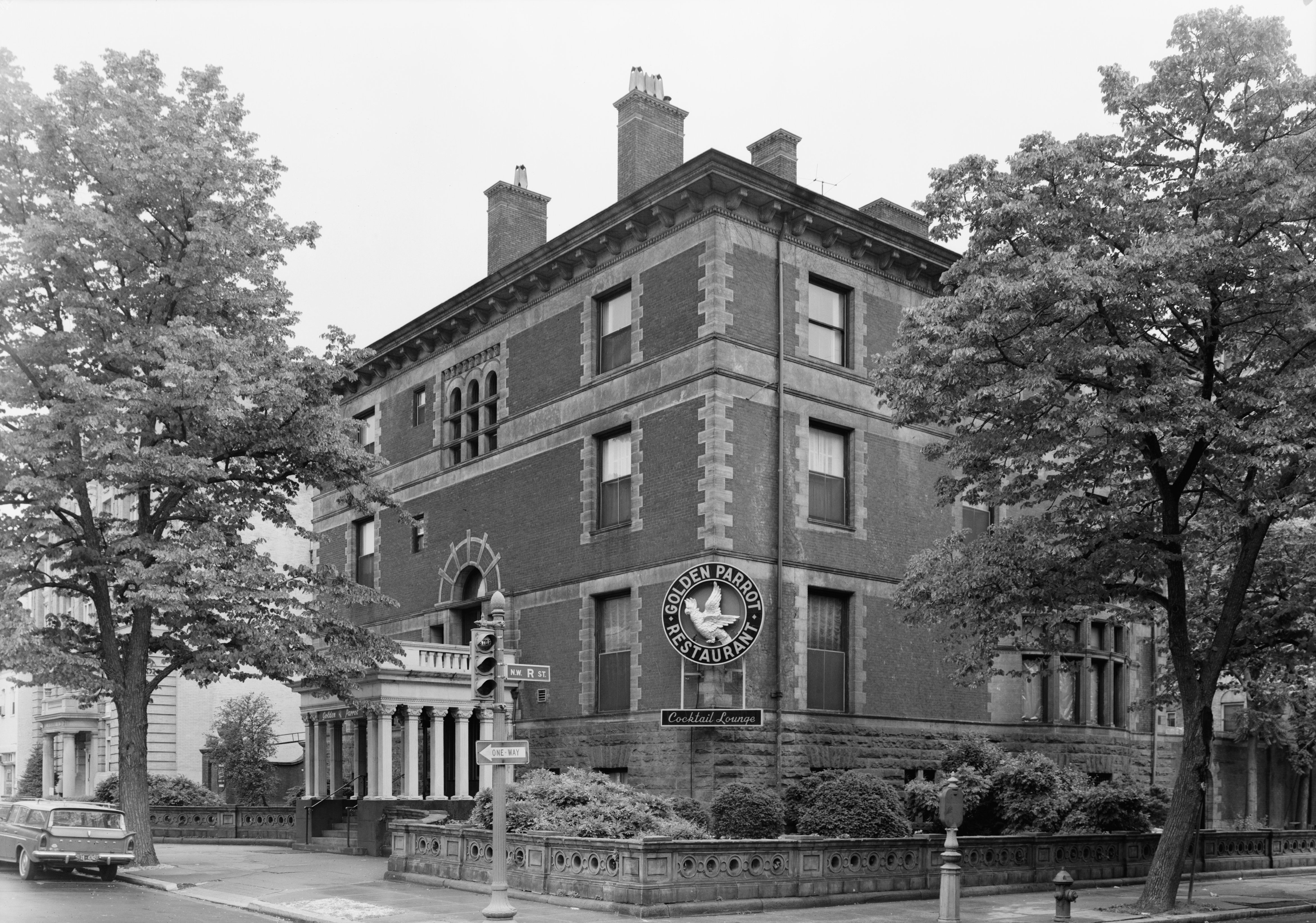
Fraser Mansion as the Golden Parrot restaurant

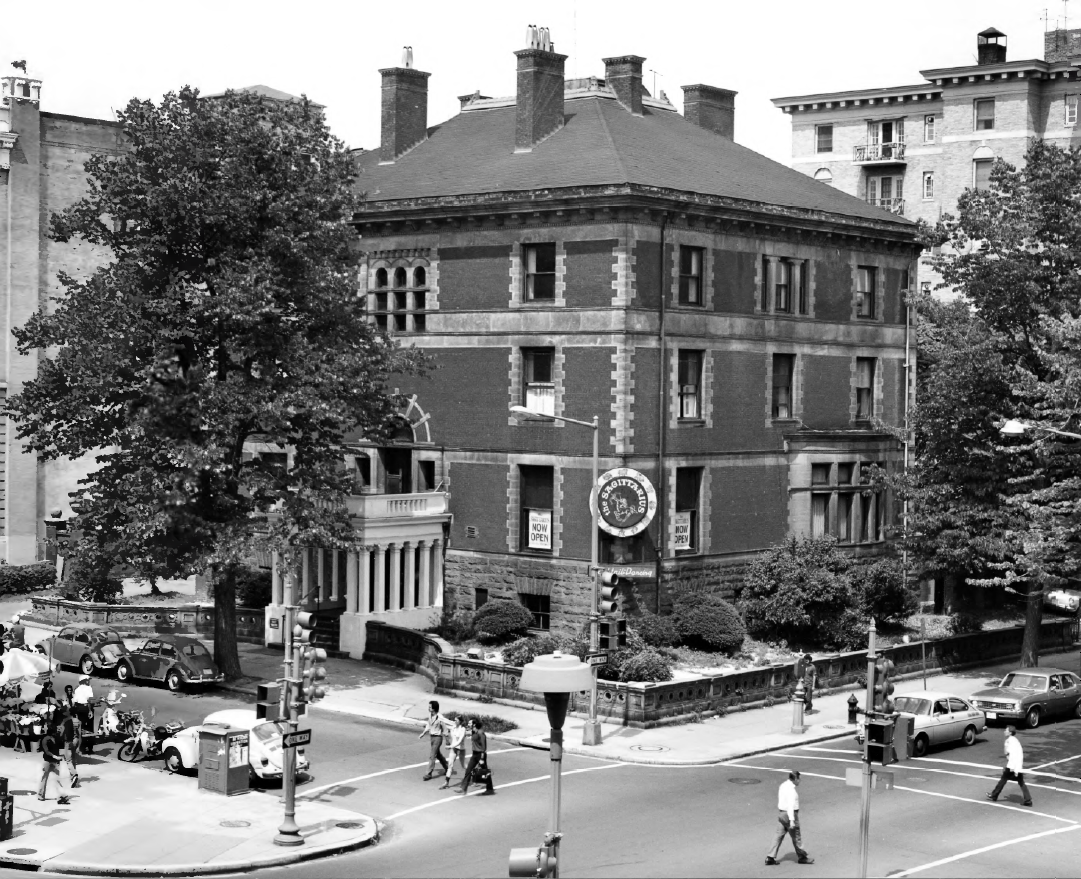
Fraser Mansion in 1975, as the Sagittarius nightclub

In 1932, the lower floor of the mansion began operation as the Parrot Tea Room, a tea house, with a boarding house located on the upper levels. In 1950, upon leasing to John Goldstein, the facility was converted to a restaurant and renamed the Golden Parrot. The mansion was sold in 1974, and the restaurant was renamed the Golden Booeymonger. Later, the mansion became home to nightclubs Larry Brown's and Sagittarius.

The mansion was again sold in 1981 to Walter Sommer for $2 million. In 1982, following a $3 million restoration/renovation, the Fourways fine dining restaurant on the first floor and the Bermuda Bar and Grill below it were opened. The Fourways served Continental European and American dishes under the leadership of chef Jacques Barre.

By 1988, Sommer opened the Bermuda Bar and Grill patio-cafe alongside the Fourways. According to the Nation's Restaurant News, the restaurant seated 40 people inside and 60 outside, and was modeled after the Fourways Restaurant and Inn of Bermuda. Among other things, the restaurant featured an all-you-can-eat salad bar, an unlimited Sunday brunch, and "traditional Bermuda drink, Dark & Stormy, made with Bermuda's Gosling's Black Seal Rum and Ginger Beer. Another Bermudian tradition, Bermuda fish chowder with Outerbridge's Original Sherry Peppers Sauce was always on the menu.

== Proposed apartment building ==
In 1987, Sommer proposed to construct a seven-story, 29-unit apartment building in its parking lot behind the mansion. At the time, the property was zoned residential, with variances permitting a restaurant on the property. Then-owner Walter Sommer claimed that the variances restricted him unfairly, requiring him to go to the zoning board multiple times for changes to his business, in a process that he considered costly and time consuming. Additionally, Sommer claimed that without commercial zoning, he was unable to obtain a "realistic commercial loan" to fund maintenance costs. Between 1982 and 1987, the D.C. Board of Zoning Appeals granted Sommer variances to expand the commercial use of the building above the first floor permitting a private business club on the second floor. The club never opened. The third floor was an apartment for the General Manager.

While the proposed design for the building was approved by the D.C. Office of Planning and the Historic Preservation Review Board, and the Department of Public Works had determined that the plans, which would have included underground parking for both the apartments and the restaurant, would not cause an increase in parking or traffic problems in the area, the community opposed the building's construction. Nearby resident Duff Gilfont described the proposed apartment building as "such a blight to this area," and that "there would have been so many people inconvenienced by it." Several neighborhood associations opposed rezoning the building, expressing concern that the new building would be used as a hotel. Sommer denied that there were plans to use the building as a hotel or an office building.

Several covenants were proposed. One would require that the new building only be used for residential purposes. A second would have required that any future owners of the Fraser Mansion would be required to submit their plans for the building for review by the D.C. Historic Preservation Review Board. A third proposed covenant would have split the zoning of the property, allowing only residential use of the building, but requiring variances for any changes in the parking for the restaurant or the apartment building.

Despite the proposed covenants, however, community groups vowed to continue to fight the proposal.

== Bankruptcy and attempted sale ==
During the fight over the building's zoning, Sommer claimed that he would go bankrupt if he was unable to develop the property. Fourways filed for Chapter 11 bankruptcy in 1989, and by October 1989, the Fourways restaurant had closed.

Trying to pay creditors, Sommer attempted to sell the mansion. Sommer's initial asking price was $7 million, which he later reduced to $3 million. A number of embassies and chanceries looked at the mansion, but none purchased. According to real estate broker Stanley Holland, Sommer "thought it was worth more than it was."

== Church of Scientology ==
In 1994, the Church of Scientology purchased the property with the intention of using the building as a church facility. In purchasing the building, Scientology first purchased mortgages on the building in 1993 from the FDIC, which had assumed the loans after the 1990 failure of the National Bank of Washington. Following the purchase of the loans, Scientology foreclosed on the building. In the subsequent foreclosure auction, Scientology purchased the building for $2.7 million.

Following $1 million in renovations, the building was dedicated as the new Founding Church of Scientology on October 21, 1995, by Religious Technology Center chairman David Miscavige.

The Founding Church of Scientology relocated from the Fraser Mansion to the nearby Embassy Building on 16th Street NW on October 31, 2009. Fraser Mansion now serves as the National Affairs Office for the Church of Scientology. The nearby L. Ron Hubbard House is now a historic landmark and house museum for the historic Founding Church of Scientology.

== See also ==
- Duncan Phillips House
- James G. Blaine Mansion
