= Hornblower & Marshall =

Washington D.C. architectural firm

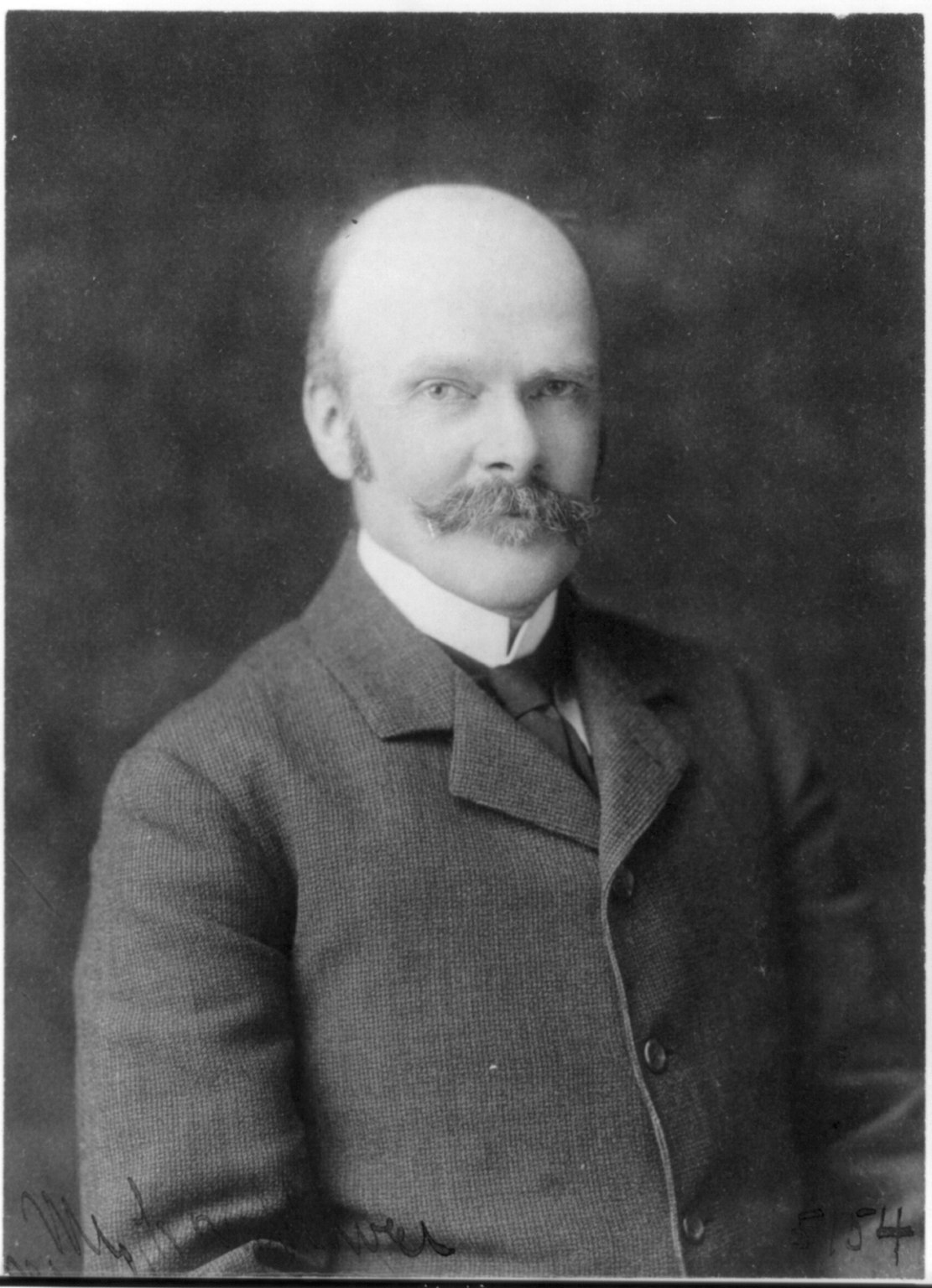
Joseph C. Hornblower

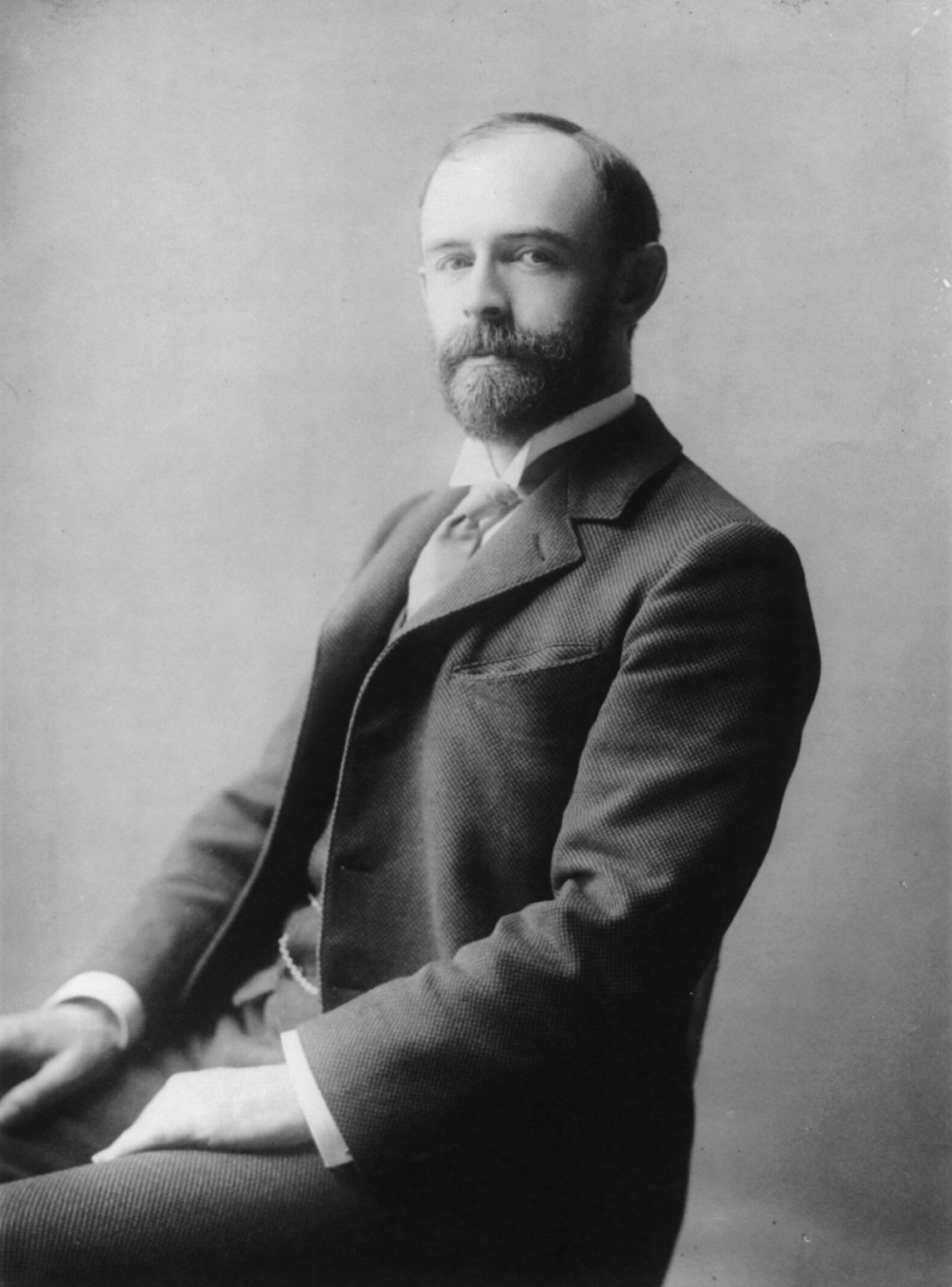
James R. Marshall

Hornblower & Marshall was a Washington, D.C.–based architectural firm that was a partnership between Joseph Coerten Hornblower (1848–1908) and James Rush Marshall (1851–1927). The firm designed numerous substantial government and other buildings, a number of which have been listed on the U.S. National Register of Historic Places.

For example, the partnership won a competition with its design for the monumental, Beaux-arts style U.S. Custom House of Baltimore, Maryland, that was built in 1903 and which served as a Custom House until 1953.

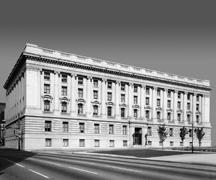
Baltimore Custom House

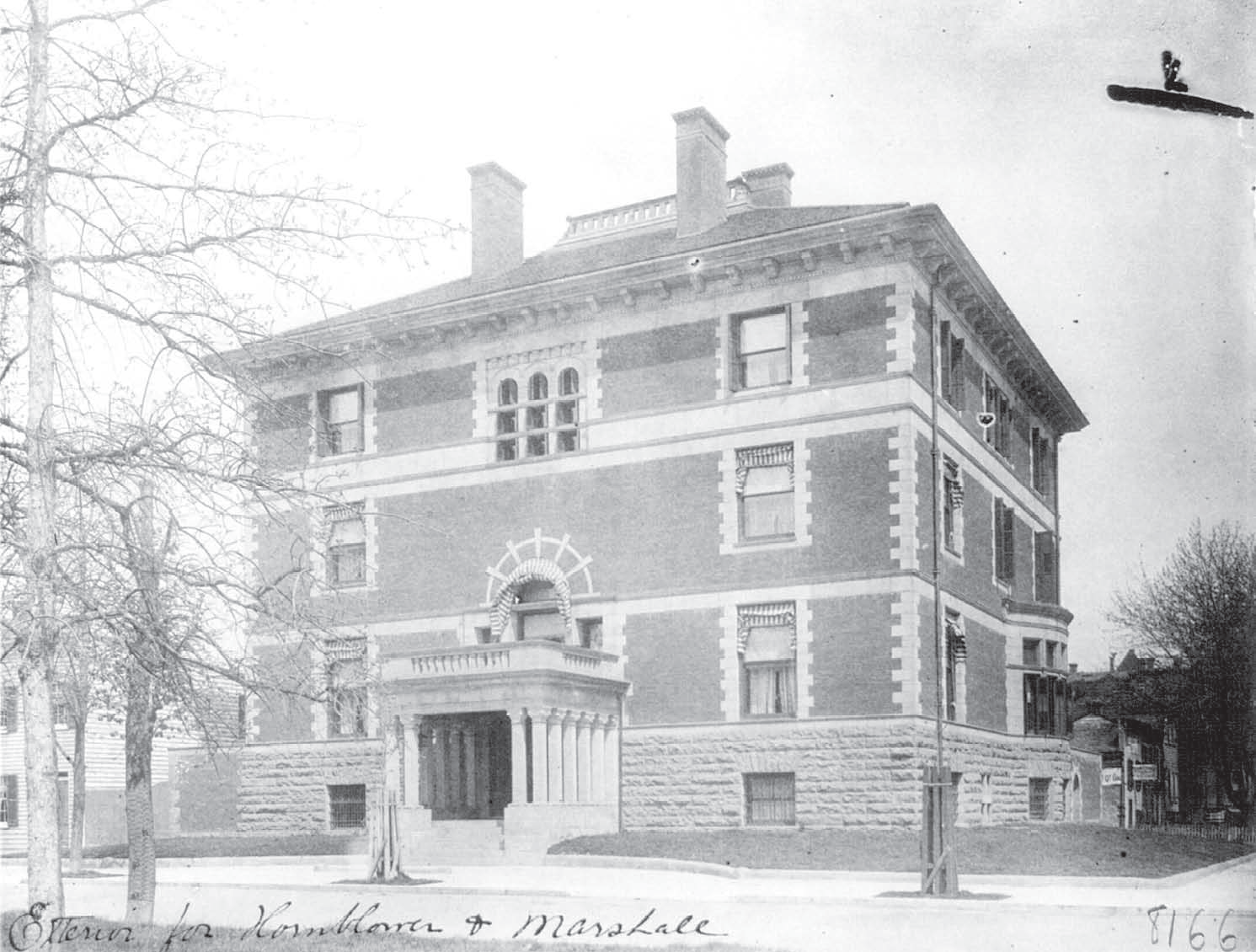
Fraser Mansion, completed 1890

Other works by the firm include:

- Fraser Mansion (1890), 1701 20th St., NW., Washington, D.C., NRHP-listed, a brick and pink granite Beaux Arts building
- Duncan Phillips House (1897), 1600–1614 21st St., NW., Washington, D.C., NRHP-listed
- U.S. Marine Corps Barracks (1907), 8th and I Sts., SE, Washington, D.C., NRHP-listed
- U.S. Custom House (1907), 40 S. Gay St., Baltimore, Maryland, NRHP-listed
- Lothrop Mansion (1908), 2001 Connecticut Ave., Washington, D.C., NRHP-listed
- Samuel Hill House (1909), 814 E. Highland Dr., Seattle, Washington, NRHP-listed
- National Museum of Natural History (1910), National Mall, Washington, D.C.
- Engine Company 23 (1910), 2119 G, NW., Washington, D.C., NRHP-listed
- Army and Navy Club (1912), 901 17th Street NW, Washington, D.C.
- Maryhill Museum (completed 1926, after construction paused in WWI), SW of Goldendale, Washington on U.S. 197, NRHP-listed

The Smithsonian Institution holds the largest collection of Hornblower & Marshall documents.
