= Outerbridge Peppers =

Food manufacturer in Bermuda

- Type: Private
- Industry: Specialty foods
- Founded: Bermuda (1964)
- Headquarters: Shelly Bay, Bermuda
- Key people: The Outerbridge Family
- Products: Sauces, condiments
- Website: Outerbridge's Original

Outerbridge Peppers is a food company based in Bermuda whose products include a range of sauces and condiments. Their flagship product is Outerbridge's Original Sherry Peppers Sauce, a traditional condiment in Bermuda fish chowder. It is one of Bermuda's few exports.

== Ingredients ==
The flagship Outerbridge's Original uses Spanish Sherry and cherry peppers from the United States, as well as 17 herbs and spices such as rosemary, thyme and garlic. The finished sauce ranks low on the Scoville scale with 146 SHUs, though hotter versions are available.

== History ==
The practice of adding chili peppers to sherry dates to the 1600s. Outerbridge Peppers was founded in 1964 by brothers Yeaton and Robbert Outerbridge. The Original formed the base of an expanded product line in the following years, including a Bloody Mary mix, mustard, and others. Yeaton Outerbridge had divested in the company by 2004.

== Uses ==
Sherry peppers are a primary condiment served with Bermuda fish chowder. It has also been served with terrapin soup in New Orleans.
