= New England Great Chowder Cook-Off =

Annual cooking competition in Newport, Rhode Island

The Great Chowder Cook-Off is an annual event that was held at the Newport Yachting Center in Newport, Rhode Island, US, for 33 years and is now held at Fort Adams State Park in Newport, RI. The event typically takes place in early or mid June.

At first, the Cook-Off was open only to local chefs but more recently, there have been entries from as far away as Seattle, New York, Atlantic City, California, Florida, Carolina Beach, North Carolina, and Ireland.

== History ==
The event was started in 1981 and was originally called the New England Clam Chowder Cook-Off, as New England clam chowder was the only type at the Cook-Off at that time. A creative category was added a few years later though there was no award (as in the New England category); a seafood category was added the following year. Awards were given in these categories, as well, starting with the 28th annual Great Chowder Cook-Off. The 28th introduced clam cakes, though again with no award, which came into play in its 29th year. The 30th had a clam cake-eating contest repeated in 2013 (the 32nd Cook-Off).

The Cook-Off has been assisted by sponsors in recent years, and the name of the sponsor is added to the title of the event. The winner of the Cook-Off is announced at the end of the day in addition to appearing in The Newport Daily News the next day.

In 2011, Tony's Seafood Restaurant Cedar Key Florida (Tony's Clam Chowder) won the event for best clam chowder the third win in a row (2009,2010. 2011). Chef/Owner Eric Jungklaus of Tony's Seafood Restaurant in Florida accepted an invitation to compete in 2009. Tony's Chowder was inducted into the Great Chowder Cook-off Hall of Fame. In 2011 Tony's 3X Clam Chowder World Champion was named by the Newport Waterfront Events Director Rich Travis, the events "Greatest Champion".

The Mooring restaurant won one time during taping for the Food Network show Challenge. The show is primarily for baking but it does have episodes with other focuses—one of which was the Great Chowder Cook-Off.

In 2015, the location of the Cook-Off was changed to Newport's Fort Adams State Park.

The Cook-Off was called off in 2020 due to the 2020 pandemic.

== The event ==
Tickets are sold at the event and also online through the Newport Waterfront Events website and vary in price every year. Children aged 12 & under are free with an adult. After paying for entry, attenders are entitled to the chowder provided by competing restaurants and beverages are available for purchase, both alcoholic and non-alcoholic.

== The contest ==
Over the years, the basic rules have stayed the same. Each attender is given a color-coded voting ticket for each category: Clam Chowder, Seafood Chowder, and most Spirited Team. Voters then drop their tickets into the bins of the restaurant or company whose chowder they enjoyed the most. The votes are counted about an hour before the event's end. Winners for each category are announced at 6pm at the event and are immediately posted on the Newport Waterfront Events website.
