= Bermuda fish chowder =

Soup considered the national dish of Bermuda

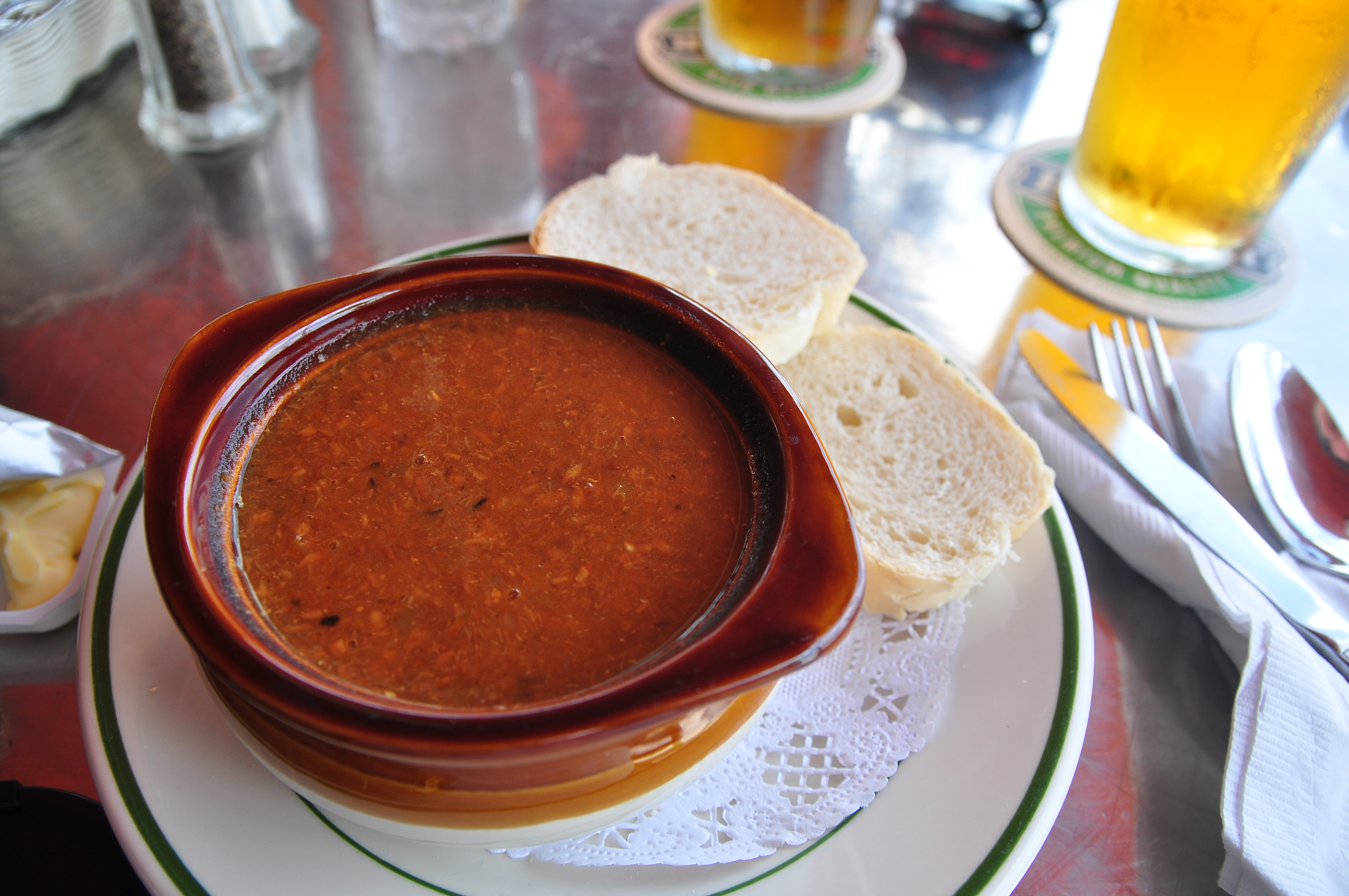
- Type: Soup
- Place of origin: Bermuda
- Serving temperature: Hot
- Main ingredients: fish, stock, tomato purée

Bermuda fish chowder is a chowder soup that is considered the national dish of Bermuda. Its basic ingredients are fish, tomatoes and onions seasoned with black rum and hot sauce. The recipe is believed to have been created in the 17th century by English colonists in Bermuda.

== Recipes ==
The basic ingredients of Bermuda fish chowder are fish stock, fish fillets, and tomato puree. Other ingredients are typically vegetables and herbs and spices.

There are many variations spun off of the basic ingredients. One recipe uses one cup of chopped onion, celery, and carrot as well as diced pork hocks and a dash of Worcestershire sauce. Another uses white fish fillets (either cod, grouper, tilefish, or snapper), onions, carrots, celery, minced garlic, unsalted butter, bay leaf, thyme, allspice, Worcestershire sauce, black rum and sherry pepper sauce. Other types of fish can be used like rock fish or sea bass.

The consistency of Bermuda fish chowder is much lighter than chowders that are thickened with milk or cream. It is sometimes compared with bouillabaisse.

== Traditional condiments ==
Traditional recipes are seasoned with black rum, and "sherry peppers sauce", a hot sauce made of pimentos marinated in sherry and spices. Locally manufactured Outerbridge's Original Sherry Peppers Sauce is one of Bermuda's few exports. A 1990 LA Times article states that "there is a saying on the island" that Bermuda fish chowder must include Outerbridge's sauce. Black Seal Rum made by Bermudan distiller Gosling Brothers is also considered the traditional rum to flavour the soup.

== History ==
The recipe is believed to have been created in the 17th century by English colonists in Bermuda. Sherry peppers sauce is also a Bermudan tradition dating from that period. Called "peppers wine", it was used by sailors to make spoiled food more palatable.

== See also ==
- Bouillabaisse
- Gumbo
- Fish chowder
- List of soups
- List of stews
